= List of lakes of Maine =

The qualifications for this list of Maine lakes is that the lake is located partially or entirely in Maine, named, and has a surface area of more than 10 acres (40,000 m^{2}). This makes it legally a great pond unless it is dammed, smaller than 10 acres (40,000 m^{2}) prior to damming, smaller than 30 acres (120,000 m^{2}) afterwards, and entirely bounded by land owned by a single landowner. There are at least 2,677 lakes or ponds in Maine with no name (not including 2 whose name begins "Unnamed"), 222 of which would be on this list if named. There are also at least 1,022 named lakes too small to make this list.

== Largest lakes of Maine ==
The twenty largest lakes in Maine by surface area, without regard to county, are listed below. Several are impoundments or chains of connected basins treated as a single water body in the source data. Lakes that lie in more than one county, or that cross a state or international boundary, have every jurisdiction listed; elsewhere in this article each lake appears only once, under the single county assigned to it by the primary reference.

Rank	Name	Area		County
Rank	Name	acres	ha	County
1	Moosehead Lake	75,471	30,542	Piscataquis, Somerset
2	Sebago Lake	30,513	12,348	Cumberland
3	Chesuncook Lake	25,183	10,191	Piscataquis
4	Pemadumcook Chain of Lakes	18,670	7,560	Penobscot
5	Flagstaff Lake	17,380	7,030	Somerset, Franklin
6	Spednic Lake	17,219	6,968	Washington; also York County, New Brunswick, Canada
7	Mooselookmeguntic Lake	16,359	6,620	Oxford, Franklin
8	East Grand Lake	15,917	6,441	Aroostook, Washington; also York County, New Brunswick, Canada
9	West Grand Lake	14,467	5,855	Washington
10	Chamberlain Lake	10,932	4,424	Piscataquis
11	Big Lake	10,444	4,227	Washington
12	Big Eagle Lake	9,542	3,862	Piscataquis
13	Brassua Lake	9,454	3,826	Somerset
14	Graham Lake	9,383	3,797	Hancock
15	Millinocket Lake	8,571	3,469	Penobscot
16	Great Pond	8,533	3,453	Kennebec
17	Square Lake	8,090	3,270	Aroostook
18	Umbagog Lake	7,768	3,144	Oxford; also Coös County, New Hampshire
19	Richardson Lakes	7,751	3,137	Oxford
20	Schoodic Lake	7,021	2,841	Piscataquis

== Lakes by county ==
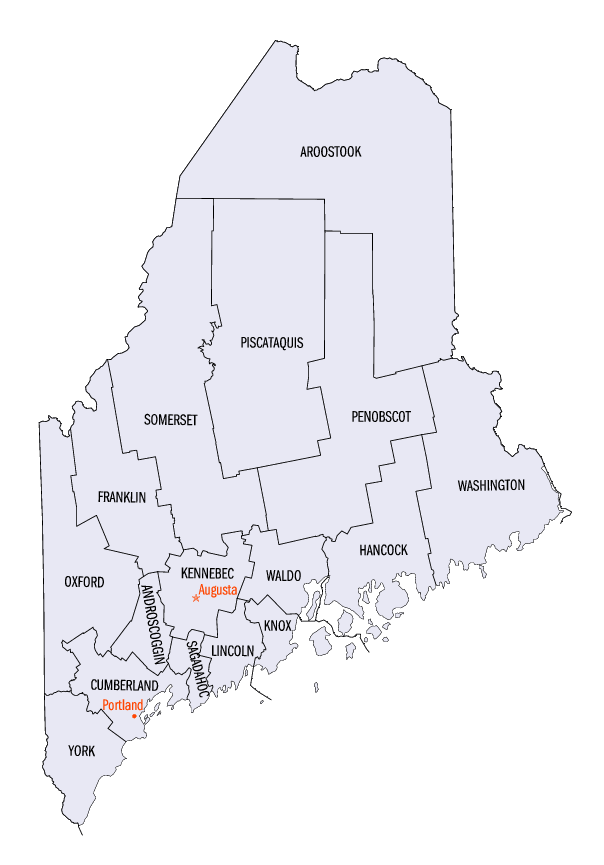
Map of the 16 counties of the State of Maine

The lakes are organized by county, and from largest to smallest surface area in each county. Some lakes are located in, or border multiple counties; in these cases they are listed in the single county assigned to them in the primary reference for this list. In some cases, alternative or former names of the lakes are given inside parentheses. The list of adjoining towns is not always complete. Swimming, fishing, and/or boating are permitted in some of these lakes, but not all. This is to protect the wildlife/ animals in and around the lake.

== Androscoggin County ==
Name	Area		Volume		Adjoining towns
Name	acres	ha	acre-feet	m^{3}	Adjoining towns
Lake Auburn	2,277	921	89,020	109,800,000	Auburn
Sabattus Pond	1,973	798	21,939	27,061,000	Greene, Wales, Sabattus
Gulf Island Pond	930	380			Auburn, Greene, Lewiston,
Tripp Pond	735	297	9,237	11,394,000	Poland
Taylor Pond	653	264	11,636	14,353,000	Auburn
Bear & Little Bear Pds	437	177	574	708,000	Turner, Hartford
Middle Range Pond	382	155	11,436	14,106,000	Poland
Upper Range Pond	357	144	7,067	8,717,000	Poland
Lower Range Pond	270	110	3,918	4,833,000	Poland
Long Pond	209	85	2,002	2,469,000	Livermore
Pleasant Pond	191	77	4,824	5,950,000	Turner
Allen Pond	188	76	3,175	3,916,000	Greene
Brettuns Pond	182	74	2,675	3,300,000	Livermore
Round Pond	162	66	2,500	3,100,000	Livermore
No Name Pond	145	59	1,870	2,310,000	Lewiston
Little Wilson (French Ramsdell) Pond	112	45	2,639	3,255,000	Auburn, Turner
The Basin	107	43	119	147,000	Turner
Runaround Pond	107	43	445	549,000	Durham
Coffee Pond	106	43	4,499	5,549,000	Casco
Shaker Bog	102	41	1,390	1,710,000	Poland, New Gloucester
Moose Hill Pond	95	38	1,586	1,956,000	Livermore Falls
Curtis Bog	65	26	973	1,200,000	Sabattus
Loon (Spear) Pond	60	24	731	902,000	Sabattus
Worthley Pond	54	22	832	1,026,000	Poland
Sutherland Pond	51	21	254	313,000	Sabattus
Crystal (Beals) Pond	48	19	520	640,000	Turner
Estes Bog	40	16			Poland
Berry Pond	32	13	316	390,000	Greene
Dumpling Pond	31	13	212	261,000	Casco
Bartlett Pond	28	11	300	370,000	Livermore
Little Sabattus Pond (Hooper Pond)	26	11	205	253,000	Greene
Mud Pond	23	9.3	122	150,000	Turner
Schoolhouse Pond	21	8.5	119	147,000	Livermore Falls, Fayette
Sandy Bottom Pond	20	8.1	160	200,000	Turner
Lily Pond	19	7.7	243	300,000	Turner
Nelson Pond	18	7.3	85	105,000	Livermore
Lard Pond	15	6.1	68	84,000	Turner
Bonny Pond	15	6.1	195	241,000	Leeds, Monmouth
Island Pond	14	5.7	116	143,000	Leeds

== Aroostook County ==
Name	Area		Volume		Adjoining towns
Name	acres	ha	acre-feet	m^{3}	Adjoining towns
East Grand Lake (Schoodic Lake)	15,917	6,441	499,404	616,006,000	Orient, Weston, Danforth, Forest City Twp
Square Lake	8,090	3,270	277,829	342,697,000	T15 R6 WELS, T16 R5
Eagle Lake	5,601	2,267	249,702	308,003,000	Eagle Lake, Wallagrass, T16 R5 WELS, T16 R6 WELS
Scopan Lake	4,986	2,018	110,286	136,036,000	Ashland, Masardis, Scopan Twp, T11 R4 WELS
Mattawamkeag Lake	3,323	1,345	7,662	9,451,000	Island Falls, T4 R3 WELS
Fish River Lake	2,568	1,039	42,043	51,859,000	T13 R8 WELS, T14 R8 WELS
Cross Lake	2,470	1,000	52,267	64,470,000	T16 R5 WELS, T17 R5 WELS
Saint Froid Lake	2,339	947	93,853	115,766,000	Winterville Plt T14 R7 WELS
Portage Lake	2,258	914	18,971	23,400,000	Portage Lake
Pleasant Lake	1,817	735	57,966	71,500,000	Island Falls, T4 R3 WELS
Beau Lake	1,795	726	138,678	171,057,000	Big Twenty Twp, T19 R11 WELS
East Lake	1,787	723	25,100	31,000,000	T17 R14 WELS
Madawaska Lake	1,569	635	25,961	32,022,000	Westmanland, T16 R4 WELS
Umsaskis Lake	1,302	527	29,966	36,963,000	T11 R13 WELS, T10 R13 WELS
Meduxnekeag (Drews) Lake	1,144	463	19,120	23,580,000	Linneus, New Limerick, Oakfield
Molunkus Lake	1,108	448	15,000	19,000,000	Macwahoc Plt, Molunkus Twp, T1 R5 WELS
Long Lake (Harvey Pond)	1,105	447			T11 R13 WELS, T12 R13 WELS
Wytopitlock Lake	1,090	440	13,739	16,947,000	Glenwood Plt, T2 R4 WELS
Mud Lake	1,002	405	10,138	12,505,000	T17 R4 WELS, T17 R5 WELS
Depot Lake	864	350	3,124	3,853,000	T13 R16 WELS
Second Musquacook Lake	758	307	21,391	26,385,000	T11 R11 WELS
Round Pond	744	301			T13 R12 WELS
Fourth Musquacook Lake	729	295	12,114	14,942,000	T11 R11 WELS, T10 R11 WELS
Glazier Lake	703	284	47,001	57,975,000	T18 R10 WELS
Big Machia Lake	694	281	13,479	16,626,000	T12 R8 WELS, T12 R9 WELS
First Musquacook Lake	644	261	12,160	15,000,000	T11 R11 WELS, T12 R11 WELS
Brackett Lake	582	236	7,713	9,514,000	Weston
Mattaseunk Lake	579	234	6,273	7,738,000	Molunkus Twp
Deering Lake (Longfellow Lake)	506	205	13,195	16,276,000	Orient, Weston
North Lake	469	190	9,555	11,786,000	Orient
Saint Croix Lake	456	185	4,566	5,632,000	Saint Croix Twp, Webbertown Twp
Chandler Lake	418	169	4,656	5,743,000	T9 R7 WELS, T9 R8 WELS
Skitacook Lake	407	165	4,405	5,433,000	Oakfield T4 R3 WELS
Third Musquacook Lake	390	160	8,735	10,774,000	T11 R11 WELS
Christina Reservoir	383	155			Fort Fairfield
Plunkett Pond	380	150	4,695	5,791,000	Benedicta Twp, Silver Ridge Twp
Rockabema Lake	376	152	5,288	6,523,000	Moro Plt
Rowe Lake	370	150	6,726	8,296,000	T11 R8 WELS
Arnold Brook Lake	363	147			Presque Isle
Togue Pond	341	138	12,652	15,606,000	T15 R9 WELS
Carr Pond	323	131	9,079	11,199,000	T13 R8 WELS
Upper Macwahoc Lake	297	120	460	570,000	Sherman, T3 R4 WELS
Gardner Pond	283	115	12,081	14,902,000	T15 R9 WELS
Flinn Pond	282	114	961	1,185,000	Benedicta Twp, T1 R5 WELS
Deboullie Lake	277	112	11,493	14,176,000	T15 R9 WELS
Clayton Lake	265	107	2,736	3,375,000	T12 R8 WELS
Hodgdon Deadwater	250	100			Hodgdon
Nickerson Lake	243	98	7,688	9,483,000	Linneus, New Limerick
Little Machias Lake	238	96	2,467	3,043,000	Nashville Plt
Caribou Lake	236	96	2,529	3,119,000	Island Falls, T3 R4 WELS
First (& Second) Wallagrass Lake	230	93	1,657	2,044,000	Eagle Lake, Saint John Plt, Wallagrass, T16 R8 WEL
Falls Pond	224	91	1,082	1,335,000	Allagash, T18 R10 WELS
Presley Lake	203	82	320	390,000	T12 R17 WELS
Sucker Lake	201	81	3,234	3,989,000	Weston, Danforth
Second Chase Pond	191	77	11,152	13,756,000	T14 R9 WELS
Lower Macwahoc Lake	188	76	1,848	2,279,000	T2 R4 WELS
Little East Lake	182	74			T17 R14 WELS
McGowan Pond	155	63	428	528,000	T11 R8 WELS, T12 R8 WELS
Monson Pond	150	61	591	729,000	Easton, Fort Fairfield
Black Pond	147	59	5,456	6,730,000	T15 R9 WELS
Crystal Lake	145	59	685	845,000	Hersey
Braley Lake	145	59	1,435	1,770,000	T3 R4 WELS
McKeen Lake	141	57	676	834,000	T14 R10 WELS
Third Sly Brook Lake	138	56	2,711	3,344,000	New Canada
Mud Lake	137	55	1,508	1,860,000	Oakfield, T4 R3 WELS
Clayton Lake	134	54			T11 R14 WELS
Cunliffe Lake	122	49	1,161	1,432,000	T12 R13 WELS
Long Pond	121	49	554	683,000	T11 R10 WELS, T11 R11 WELS
Hanson Brook Lake	120	49			Mapleton, Presque Isle
Alder Lake	120	49			Chapman T11 R4 WELS
Wheelock Lake	117	47	1,301	1,605,000	Saint John Plt
Spaulding Lake	116	47	1,712	2,112,000	Oakfield
Mud Lake (North)	116	47	1,192	1,470,000	T3 R3 WELS, T3 R4 WELS
Industrial Waste Pond	116	47			Easton
Upper McNally Pond	113	46	827	1,020,000	T11 R10 WELS
California Pond	110	45	256	316,000	New Canada
Center Pond	106	43	120	150,000	T10 R8 WELS
Trafton Lake	105	42			Limestone
Spectacle Pond	104	42	184	227,000	T10 R8 WELS
Beaver Tail Pond	100	40	1,212	1,495,000	T14 R9 WELS, T14 R10 WELS
Number Nine Lake	99	40	460	570,000	T9 R3 WELS
Third Chase Pond	96	39	4,169	5,142,000	T14 R9 WELS
Soldier Pond	96	39			Wallagrass
Caribou Lake	96	39	101	125,000	Washburn
Round Pond	94	38			T14 R8 WELS
Pratt Lake	91	37			T11 R9 WELS
Cochrane Lake	91	37	1,088	1,342,000	New Limerick, Smyrna
Dickwood Lake	90	36	363	448,000	Eagle Lake
First Sly Brook Lake	89	36	626	772,000	New Canada
Blake Lake	89	36	796	982,000	T16 R6 WELS
Cranberry Pond	88	36			T9 R5 WELS
Germain Lake	84	34	99	122,000	Madawaska
Echo Lake	84	34			Presque Isle
3rd Pelletier Brook Lk	83	34	817	1,008,000	T16 R9 WELS
Longley (Longfellow) Lake	82	33	756	933,000	Orient
Faulkner Lake	80	32	386	476,000	Weston
Greenlaw Pond	78	32	113	139,000	T12 R7 WELS, T12 R8 WELS
Linscott Pond	74	30	730	900,000	T13 R16 WELS
Beaver Pond	72	29	79	97,000	T8 R5 WELS
Ugh Lake	71	29	455	561,000	T12 R14 WELS
Otter Lake	67	27	803	990,000	T3 R4 WELS
B Lake	67	27	188	232,000	Hammond, Smyrna
Hunnewell Lake	65	26	708	873,000	Saint John Plt
Beaver Pond	65	26			T12 R17 WELS
Pushineer Pond	64	26	1,036	1,278,000	T15 R9 WELS
Durepo Lake	64	26			Limestone
Burntland Pond	64	26	681	840,000	T11 R17 WELS T12 R17 WELS
Beaver Brook Lake	64	26	657	810,000	Linneus
Little Falls Pond	62	25	356	439,000	Allagash
Jones Pond	62	25	779	961,000	Big Twenty Twp
Carry Pond	61	25	288	355,000	T16 R4 WELS
Big Black Brook Lake	61	25			Caswell
Lost Pond	59	24	109	134,000	T11 R10 WELS
Otter Pond	57	23	102	126,000	T8 R5 WELS
Mud Lake	57	23			Perham, Westmanland
Ferguson Pond	57	23	324	400,000	T14 R8 WELS
Timoney Lake	55	22	610	750,000	Oakfield, Smyrna
Long Lake	55	22			Oakfield
Pennington Pond	54	22	87	107,000	T15 R6 WELS
4th Pelletier Brk Lake	53	21	482	595,000	T16 R9 WELS
Charles Pond	52	21	156	192,000	T14 R15 WELS
Mud Pond	51	21	486	599,000	T12 R17 WELS
Thompson Deadwater	50	20			Reed Plt, Upper Molunkus Twp, T2 R4 WELS
Third Wallagrass Lake	50	20	207	255,000	Saint John Plt
Salmon Brook Lake	50	20			Perham
Polly Pond	50	20	502	619,000	T13 R15 WELS
Island Pond	49	20	430	530,000	T14 R8 WELS
Billings Pond	49	20	127	157,000	T11 R9 WELS
Black Lake	48	19	308	380,000	Fort Kent
Bruleau Pond	47	19	345	426,000	T14 R15 WELS, T15 R15 WELS
Squirrel Pond	46	19	282	348,000	T11 R10 WELS
Mc Clusky Lake	46	19	94	116,000	T14 R5 WELS T15 R5 WELS
Cold Brook Lake	46	19	462	570,000	T3 R4 WELS
Grass Pond	45	18	54	67,000	Moro Plt
Gould Pond	44	18	67	83,000	New Limerick
Farrar Pond	44	18			T11 R10 WELS
Cross Lake	44	18			T18 R10 WELS
Bean Pond	44	18	438	540,000	T11 R17 WELS
Tenmile Lake	43	17	438	540,000	Forkstown Twp
Matherson Pond	43	17	39	48,000	T8 R5 WELS, T9 R5 WELS
Hale Pond	42	17	310	380,000	Moro Plt
Dump Road Pond	42	17			Monticello
Cunliffe Pond	42	17	438	540,000	T13 R16 WELS
Cranberry Pond	40	16			Scopan Twp
Round Mountain Pond	39	16	502	619,000	T11 R8 WELS
Mud Pond	39	16			T13 R8 WELS
East Loring Lake	39	16			Caswell
Bradbury (Barker) Lake	39	16	722	891,000	New Limerick
Sterling Pond	37	15	483	596,000	T13 R7 WELS
McLean Lake	37	15	160	200,000	Saint Francis
Upper Deadwater Pond	36	15			T11 R10 WELS
Portland Lake	36	15	356	439,000	Bridgewater
Upper Hudson Pond	35	14	568	701,000	T11 R10 WELS
Presque Isle Lake	35	14			T9 R3 WELS
Little Presley Lake	35	14	316	390,000	T12 R17 WELS
Island Pond	34	14	450	560,000	T15 R9 WELS
Daigle Pond (West East)	34	14	94	116,000	New Canada
Bran Lake	34	14	95	117,000	Saint Francis
Ben Lake	34	14			Wallagrass
Smith Pond	33	13	296	365,000	T8 R5 WELS
Smith Brook Pond	32	13			Dudley Twp
Mud Lake	32	13	94	116,000	Stockholm
Robinson Pond	31	13			Blaine
Green Pond	31	13			New Limerick
Packard Lake	30	12	9	11,000	Bridgewater
Horseshoe Pond	30	12	285	352,000	T11 R10 WELS
Moccasin Pond	29	12	208	257,000	T14 R8 WELS
Fifth Pelletier Brk Lk	29	12			T15 R9 WELS
Carry Lake	29	12			Littleton
Bourgoin Lake	29	12	219	270,000	Frenchville Saint Agatha
Tote Road Pond	28	11	82	101,000	Moro Plt
Denny Pond	28	11	437	539,000	T15 R9 WELS
County Road Lake	28	11	281	347,000	New Limerick
1st Pelletier Brook Lk	27	11	246	303,000	T16 R9 WELS
Ross Lake	26	11	428	528,000	Littleton, Monticello
Long Lake (West East)	26	11	226	279,000	Littleton
Grey Pond	26	11	40	49,000	T12 R13 WELS
Conroy Lake	26	11	829	1,023,000	Monticello
2nd Pelletier Brook Lk	26	11	255	315,000	T16 R9 WELS
Hewes Brook Pond	25	10	243	300,000	T14 R7 WELS
Basil Pond	25	10			Fort Kent
Reed Pond	24	9.7	195	241,000	Macwahoc Plt
Perch Pond	24	9.7	124	153,000	T15 R9 WELS
Duck Pond	24	9.7	268	331,000	T2 R4 WELS
Brandy Pond	24	9.7	251	310,000	Webbertown Twp
Whitehead Lake	23	9.3	76	94,000	Bridgewater
Glancy Lake	23	9.3	72	89,000	New Limerick
West Lake	22	8.9			T9 R3 WELS
Sixth Pelletier Brk Lk	22	8.9	316	390,000	T15 R9 WELS
Mud Pond	22	8.9	212	261,000	Linneus
Mud Pond	22	8.9	268	331,000	Sherman
Mink Pond	22	8.9			T14 R10 WELS
Black Pond	22	8.9	48	59,000	Saint John Plt
Petes Pond	21	8.5	54	67,000	T13 R10 WELS
Haywire Pond	21	8.5	197	243,000	T1 R5 WELS
Big Brook Lake	21	8.5	584	720,000	T14 R10 WELS
Weeks Pond	20	8.1	33	41,000	T11 R8 WELS
Second Sly Brook Lake	20	8.1	112	138,000	New Canada
Mud Pond	20	8.1	195	241,000	T13 R7 WELS
Hafey Pond	20	8.1	66	81,000	T18 R11 WELS
Robbins Brook Pond	19	7.7	114	141,000	T12 R11 WELS
Mud Lake	19	7.7	237	292,000	Linneus
Lavels Lake	19	7.7	157	194,000	Grand Isle
Fox Pond	19	7.7	70	86,000	T17 R12 WELS
Crater Pond	19	7.7	32	39,000	T15 R9 WELS
Houlton Pond	18	7.3	187	231,000	T13 R15 WELS, T13 R16 WELS
Lindsay Lake	17	6.9	27	33,000	Easton
Bog Lake	17	6.9			T14 R5 WELS
Bennett Lake	17	6.9	48	59,000	Easton
Youngs Lake	16	6.5	155	191,000	Westfield
North Pond	16	6.5	25	31,000	Dudley Twp, T8 R3 WELS
Mud Pond	16	6.5	207	255,000	T19 R11 WELS
Mosquito Brook Pond	16	6.5	23	28,000	T14 R7 WELS
Lost Pond	16	6.5	112	138,000	Upper Molunkus Twp
Ed Jones Pond	16	6.5	148	183,000	T12 R15 WELS
Duck Pond	16	6.5	195	241,000	Smyrna
Chase Pond	16	6.5	73	90,000	Moro Plt
White Pond	15	6.1			T13 R15 WELS
Violette Pond	15	6.1			T17 R3 WELS
Upper Pond	15	6.1	146	180,000	T15 R9 WELS
North Pond	15	6.1			T14 R9 WELS
Carlisle Pond	15	6.1			T8 R3 WELS
Brishlotte Lake	15	6.1	49	60,000	Saint Agatha
Saint Almond Pond	14	5.7	151	186,000	Saint John Plt
Nadeau Pond	14	5.7			T14 R7 WELS
Mud Pond	14	5.7	122	150,000	Island Falls
Mill (Collins) Pond	14	5.7			Caribou
Limestone Pond	14	5.7			Limestone
Hunter Pond	14	5.7			Linneus
Gilbert Pond	14	5.7			Saint John Plt
First Chase Pond	14	5.7	164	202,000	T14 R9 WELS
Dickey Pond	14	5.7			T17 R5 WELS
Chandler Deadwater	14	5.7			T9 R8 WELS
Caribou Pond	14	5.7			T11 R9 WELS, T11 R10 WELS
Bryant Pond	14	5.7			Fort Fairfield
Blood Lake	14	5.7	177	218,000	T14 R16 WELS
Bishop Pond	14	5.7	122	150,000	T13 R7 WELS
Stink Pond	13	5.3	39	48,000	T15 R9 WELS
Mud Lake	13	5.3	38	47,000	Caswell
Lower Deadwater Pond	13	5.3			T11 R9 WELS
Little Black Brook Lake	13	5.3	38	47,000	Caswell
Horseshoe Pond	13	5.3	146	180,000	T16 R9 WELS
Bradford Pond	13	5.3	29	36,000	Moro Plt
Twin Pond	12	4.9	148	183,000	T12 R12 WELS
Silver Lake	12	4.9	68	84,000	T15 R5 WELS
Rock Crusher Pond	12	4.9			Island Falls
Rideout Lake	12	4.9			Monticello
Malabeam Lake	12	4.9			Limestone
Lucifee Pond	12	4.9	31	38,000	T14 R8 WELS
Lost Pond	12	4.9	61	75,000	T15 R6 WELS
Logan Lake	12	4.9	103	127,000	Houlton, Littleton
Jewell Lake	12	4.9			Monticello
Green Pond	12	4.9	62	76,000	Moro Plt
Gilman Pond	12	4.9	37	46,000	Moro Plt
Culling Pond	12	4.9			Monticello
Chapman Pit	12	4.9			Limestone
Alder Brook Lake	12	4.9			Chapman
Sag Pond	11	4.5	99	122,000	T13 R10 WELS
Martin Lake	11	4.5	128	158,000	Caswell
Lost Pond	11	4.5	97	120,000	T10 R8 WELS
Lost Pond	11	4.5			Upper Molunkus Twp
Fischer Lake	11	4.5			Fort Fairfield
Cut Pond	11	4.5			Dudley Twp
Alerton (Alberton) Lake	11	4.5			Monticello

== Cumberland County ==
Name	Area		Volume		Adjoining towns
Name	acres	ha	acre-feet	m^{3}	Adjoining towns
Sebago Lake	30,513	12,348	3,224	3,977,000,233	Casco, Naples, Raymond, Sebago, Standish, Windham
Long Lake	5,295	2,143	129,726	160,015,000	Bridgton, Harrison, Naples
Thompson Lake (The Heath)	4,419	1,788	173,712	214,271,000	Poland, Casco, Otisfield, Oxford
Little Sebago Lake	2,009	813	32,627	40,245,000	Gray, Windham
Moose Pond	1,697	687	32,020	39,500,000	Bridgton, Denmark, Sweden
Panther Pond	1,417	573	33,969	41,900,000	Raymond
Highland Lake	1,334	540	24,904	30,719,000	Bridgton
Pleasant Lake	1,332	539	40,125	49,493,000	Casco, Otisfield
Peabody Pond	740	300	24,496	30,215,000	Bridgton, Sebago
Bay of Naples Lake (Brandy Pond)	740	300	11,757	14,502,000	Naples
Crescent Lake (Rattlesnake Pond)	703	284	12,996	16,030,000	Casco, Raymond
Highland Lake	640	260	14,025	17,300,000	Falmouth, Westbrook, Windham
Thomas Pond	533	216	10,527	12,985,000	Casco, Raymond
Woods Pond	462	187	7,892	9,735,000	Bridgton
Crystal Lake (Anonymous Pond)	446	180	14,254	17,582,000	Harrison
Watchic Pond	443	179	8,651	10,671,000	Standish
Raymond Pond	344	139	5,594	6,900,000	Raymond
Sabbathday Lake	342	138	9,138	11,272,000	New Gloucester
Trickey Pond	315	127	10,108	12,468,000	Naples
Forest Lake (Goose Pond)	211	85	2,594	3,200,000	Cumberland, Gray, Windham
Bonny Eagle (Bonney Eagle) Lake	211	85	2,214	2,731,000	Standish, Buxton
Moose Pond	196	79	1,124	1,386,000	Otisfield
Dundee Pond	191	77			Gorham, Windham
Crystal Lake (Dry Pond)	185	75	5,497	6,780,000	Gray
Saturday Pond	180	73	1,698	2,094,000	Otisfield
Great Pond	171	69	578	713,000	Cape Elizabeth
Parker Pond	167	68	1,463	1,805,000	Casco
Southeast Pond	162	66	1,126	1,389,000	Baldwin, Hiram
Rich Millpond	158	64	196	242,000	Standish
Ingalls (Foster's) Pond	149	60	2,384	2,941,000	Bridgton
Island Pond	115	47	1,625	2,004,000	Harrison, Waterford
Browns Pond	112	45	1,005	1,240,000	Sebago
North Gorham Pond	94	38			Gorham, Standish, Windham
Otter Pond	90	36	812	1,002,000	Bridgton
Notched Pond	77	31	821	1,013,000	Gray, Raymond
Beaver Pond	69	28	852	1,051,000	Bridgton
Little Watchic Pond	67	27	428	528,000	Standish
Sand Pond	53	21	495	611,000	Baldwin
Mariner (Mud City) Pond	52	21	243	300,000	Sebago
Ingalls Pond (South)	49	20	38	47,000	Baldwin, Hiram
Pettingill Pond	43	17	506	624,000	Windham
Collins Pond	43	17			Windham
Adams Pond	43	17	954	1,177,000	Bridgton
Holt Pond	41	17	148	183,000	Bridgton
Cold Rain Pond	36	15	469	579,000	Naples
Halfmoon Pond	35	14			Baldwin
Little Duck Pond	34	14	321	396,000	Windham
Tarkill Pond	26	11	268	331,000	Windham
Massacre Pond	26	11			Scarborough
Little (Bill Rich) Pond	26	11	252	311,000	Otisfield
Quaker Brook Dwtr	25	10	243	300,000	Baldwin
Perley Pond	24	9.7	158	195,000	Sebago
Lily Pond	24	9.7	299	369,000	New Gloucester
Florida Lake	22	8.9			Freeport
Coon Swamp Pond	22	8.9			Otisfield
Owl Pond	21	8.5	59	73,000	Casco
Nubble Pond	21	8.5	400	490,000	Raymond
Marston Pond	18	7.3	180	220,000	Baldwin
Hog Meadow Pond	18	7.3	231	285,000	Casco
Mill Pond	16	6.5			Windham
Clark Pond	15	6.1			South Portland
Adams Pond	14	5.7	141	174,000	Baldwin, Standish
Chaffin Pond	13	5.3	146	180,000	Windham
Sanborn Pond	12	4.9	122	150,000	Baldwin
Otter Pond #2	12	4.9	201	248,000	Standish
Impoundment Pond	11	4.5			Harpswell
Duck Pond	11	4.5	115	142,000	Standish

== Franklin County ==
Name	Area		Volume		Adjoining towns
Name	acres	ha	acre-feet	m^{3}	Adjoining towns
Rangeley (Oquossoc) Lake	6,302	2,550	291,048	359,002,000	Rangeley, Rangeley Plt, Sandy River Plt
Webb (Weld) Lake	2,194	888	54,967	67,801,000	Carthage, Weld
Kennebago Lake	1,764	714	102,475	126,401,000	Davis Twp, Stetsontown Twp
Clearwater Lake	796	322	32,996	40,700,000	Farmington, Industry
Long Pond (& Lower Natanis Bog Ponds)	713	289	794	979,000	Chain of Ponds Twp
Wilson Pond	568	230	12,972	16,001,000	Wilton
Porter Lake	524	212	12,972	16,001,000	New Vineyard, Strong
Beaver Mountain Lake (Long Pond)	499	202	11,242	13,867,000	Sandy River Plt
Jim Pond	349	141	10,791	13,311,000	Jim Pond Twp
Big Island Pond	339	137	5,063	6,245,000	Chain of Ponds Twp, Seven Ponds Twp
Saddleback Lake	336	136	2,594	3,200,000	Dallas Plt
Varnum Pond	330	130	11,543	14,238,000	Wilton
Gull Pond	283	115	4,561	5,626,000	Dallas Plt
Tim Pond	271	110	3,858	4,759,000	Tim Pond Twp
Long Pond	264	107	9,953	12,277,000	Township D, Township E
John's Pond	252	102	5,854	7,221,000	Davis Twp
Massachusetts Bog	218	88			Massachusetts Gore
Dodge Pond	214	87	4,390	5,410,000	Rangeley
Crowell Pond	201	81	1,338	1,650,000	Chesterville, New Sharon, Vienna
North Pond	173	70	1,564	1,929,000	Chesterville
Loon Lake	171	69	3,089	3,810,000	Dallas Plt, Rangeley
Little Kennebago Lake	165	67	3,405	4,200,000	Stetsontown Twp
Haley Pond	164	66	1,258	1,552,000	Dallas Plt, Rangeley
Quimby Pond	157	64	1,134	1,399,000	Rangeley
Crosby Pond	152	62	1,476	1,821,000	Coburn Gore
Arnold Pond	148	60	3,290	4,060,000	Coburn Gore
Mount Blue Pond	142	57	2,008	2,477,000	Avon
Locke Pond	135	55	1,318	1,626,000	Chesterville
Round Pond	134	54	2,516	3,103,000	Rangeley
Norcross Pond	113	46	1,536	1,895,000	Chesterville
Pease Pond	109	44	1,335	1,647,000	Wilton
Gammon Pond	104	42	676	834,000	Freeman Twp, New Portland
Parker Pond	103	42	1,200	1,500,000	Jay
L Pond	97	39	438	540,000	Seven Ponds Twp
Tea Pond	90	36	3,549	4,378,000	Jim Pond Twp
Twin Island Pond	87	35	827	1,020,000	Lowelltown Twp
Big Indian Pond	85	34	580	720,000	Lowelltown Twp
Sand Pond	79	32	893	1,101,000	Chesterville
Little Jim Pond	77	31	851	1,050,000	Jim Pond Twp, King & Bartlett Twp
Round Mountain Pond	75	30	717	884,000	Alder Stream Twp
Middle Sandy River Pond	69	28	1,092	1,347,000	Sandy River Plt
Boundary Pond	66	27	681	840,000	Beattie Twp
Sabbath Day Pond	65	26	1,198	1,478,000	Township E
Little Island Pond	59	24	475	586,000	Seven Ponds Twp
Long Pond	58	23			Seven Ponds Twp
Tufts Pond	56	23	436	538,000	Kingfield
Staples Pond (Santa Claus Lake)	56	23	1,133	1,398,000	Temple
Lily Pond	56	23	531	655,000	New Vineyard
Trout Pond	55	22	542	669,000	Lowelltown Twp
Shallow Pond (Dark Score Lake)	51	21	85	105,000	Jim Pond Twp
Kamankeag Pond	50	20	600	740,000	Davis Twp
Horseshoe Pond	50	20	375	463,000	Chesterville
Mud Pond	49	20	292	360,000	Tim Pond Twp
Cow Pond	48	19	135	167,000	Lang Twp
Redington Pond	47	19	469	579,000	Carrabasset Valley
Podunk Pond	45	18	557	687,000	Carthage
Lufkin Pond	44	18	554	683,000	Phillips
Round Pond	43	17	198	244,000	Township E
Northwest Pond	43	17	422	521,000	Massachusetts Gore
Greely Pond	40	16			Dallas Plt
Redington Pond	36	15	273	337,000	Redington Twp
Upper Sandy River Pond	34	14	129	159,000	Sandy River Plt
Drury Pond	32	13	316	390,000	Temple
Bauds (Stump) Pond	31	13	321	396,000	New Vineyard
Flatiron Pond	30	12	107	132,000	Davis Twp
Beal (Trout) Pond	30	12	139	171,000	Madrid Twp
Taylor Hill Pond	29	12	287	354,000	Strong
Rock Pond	29	12	57	70,000	Chain of Ponds Twp
Mountain Pond	29	12	424	523,000	Rangeley Plt
Horseshoe Pond	28	11			Chain of Ponds Twp, Coburn Gore
Robinson Pond	27	11	268	331,000	Chesterville
Upper Hathan Bog	25	10	542	669,000	Coburn Gore
Otter Pond	25	10	96	118,000	Chain of Ponds Twp
Beaver Pond	25	10			Seven Ponds Twp
Beattie Pond	25	10	268	331,000	Beattie Twp, Lowelltown Twp
Stratton Brook Pond	24	9.7			Wyman Twp
Mill Pond	24	9.7	220	270,000	New Vineyard
Jones Pond	24	9.7	365	450,000	Wyman Twp
Greenbush Pond	24	9.7	112	138,000	Jim Pond Twp
Toothaker Pond	23	9.3	134	165,000	Phillips
Little Indian Pond	23	9.3	219	270,000	Lowelltown Twp
Hiills Pond	23	9.3	259	319,000	Perkins Twp
Fellows Pond	23	9.3	243	300,000	Chesterville
Cloutman Pond	22	8.9	243	300,000	Rangeley
Ross Pond	21	8.5	72	89,000	Rangeley
Clear Pond	21	8.5	207	255,000	Lowelltown Twp
Mosher Pond	20	8.1	197	243,000	Industry
Hurricane Pond	20	8.1			Kibby Twp
Beaver Pond	20	8.1	77	95,000	Township D
Barnard Pond	20	8.1	129	159,000	Eustis
Walton's Mill Pond	19	7.7			Farmington
Grants Pond	19	7.7	42	52,000	Massachusetts Gore
Dutton (Shiloh) Pond	19	7.7	352	434,000	Kingfield
Mud Pond	17	6.9			Coburn Gore
South (Pine Tree) Pond	16	6.5	105	130,000	Sandy River Plt
Perk Pond	16	6.5			Rangeley
Little Greely Pond	16	6.5	57	70,000	Dallas Plt
Douglass Pond	16	6.5			Kibby Twp
Day Mountain Pond	16	6.5	104	128,000	Avon
Stetson Pond	15	6.1	240	300,000	Phillips
Spencer Pond	15	6.1	100	120,000	Township D
Saddleback Pond	15	6.1	72	89,000	Sandy River Plt
Mud Pond	15	6.1			Jim Pond Twp
Chase Pond	15	6.1	139	171,000	Jim Pond Twp
Beaver Pond	15	6.1	146	180,000	Rangeley Plt
Third Greely Pond	14	5.7	139	171,000	Dallas Plt
Lower Sandy River Pond	14	5.7			Sandy River Plt
Eddy Pond	14	5.7	47	58,000	Sandy River Plt
Little Northwest Pond	13	5.3	33	41,000	Massachusetts Gore
Hid Pond	13	5.3	195	241,000	Kingfield
Gile Logan	13	5.3			Rangeley
Wethem (Welhurn) Pond	12	4.9	59	73,000	Eustis
Round Pond	12	4.9	123	152,000	Chesterville
Mud Pond	12	4.9	122	150,000	Beattie Twp
McIntire Pond	12	4.9	197	243,000	New Sharon
Unknown Pond	11	4.5	122	150,000	Gorham Gore
Elaine Pond	11	4.5	105	130,000	Lowelltown Twp
Dill Pond	11	4.5	109	134,000	Dallas Plt

== Hancock County ==
Name	Area		Volume		Adjoining towns
Name	acres	ha	acre-feet	m^{3}	Adjoining towns
Graham Lake	9,383	3,797	105,603	130,259,000	Ellsworth, Mariaville, Waltham, T8 SD
Nicatous Lake	5,212	2,109	53,429	65,904,000	T3 ND, T40 MD, T41 MD
Green Lake	3,132	1,267	106,204	131,001,000	Dedham, Ellsworth
Branch Lake	2,942	1,191	87,558	108,001,000	Ellsworth
Toddy Pond	2,408	974	49,989	61,661,000	Blue Hill, Orland, Penobscot, Surry
Tunk Lake	2,071	838	138,666	171,042,000	Sullivan, T7 SD, T10 SD
Spectacle (Spec) Pond	1,779	720	14,025	17,300,000	Osborn
Beech Hill Pond	1,422	575	51,967	64,100,000	Otis
West (Abamgamock) Lake	1,389	562	37,121	45,788,000	T3 ND, T40 MD
Molasses Pond	1,280	520	20,998	25,901,000	Eastbrook
Duck Lake	1,154	467	12,039	14,850,000	T4 ND
Donnell Pond	1,138	461	37,407	46,141,000	Franklin, T9 SD
Alligator Lake	1,067	432	22,191	27,372,000	T28 MD, T34 MD
Alamoosook Lake	997	403	15,298	18,870,000	Orland
Upper Lead Mountain Pond	977	395	24,970	30,800,000	T22 MD, T28 MD
Webb Pond	950	380	8,314	10,255,000	Eastbrook, Waltham
Long Pond	939	380	27,054	33,371,000	Mount Desert, Southwest Harbor
Gassabias Lake	939	380	3,838	4,734,000	T41 MD
Lower Pistol Lake	935	378	9,631	11,880,000	T3 ND
Phillips (Lucerne) Lake	859	348	25,943	32,000,000	Dedham
Lower Patten Pond	849	344	19,737	24,345,000	Ellsworth, Surry
Lower Sabao Lake	844	342	9,322	11,499,000	T35 MD
Brandy Pond	733	297	4,759	5,870,000	T39 MD
Upper Chain Lake	721	292	7,053	8,700,000	T4 ND
Mountainy Pond	698	282	13,929	17,181,000	Dedham
Walker Pond	693	280	13,604	16,780,000	Brooksville
Silver Lake	682	276	6,062	7,477,000	Bucksport
Spring River Lake	664	269	8,119	10,015,000	T10 SD
Great Pond	647	262	7,165	8,838,000	Great Pond
Floods Pond	635	257	25,943	32,000,000	Otis
Rocky Pond	583	236	6,495	8,011,000	T22 MD
Lower (& Middle) Lead Mtn Pond	577	234	5,579	6,882,000	T28 MD
Flanders Pond	535	217	6,512	8,032,000	Sullivan
Narraguagus Lake	479	194	4,140	5,110,000	T9 SD, T10 SD, T16 MD
Upper Sabao Lake	468	189	3,818	4,709,000	T41 MD
Eagle Lake	466	189	18,160	22,400,000	Bar Harbor
Jones Pond	462	187	5,646	6,964,000	Gouldsboro
Spring Lake	453	183	4,281	5,281,000	T3 ND
Abrams Pond	453	183	7,094	8,750,000	Eastbrook, Franklin
Upper Middle Branch Pd	440	180	9,211	11,362,000	Aurora
Hopkins Pond	429	174	9,891	12,200,000	Mariaville, Clifton
Scammon Pond	426	172	3,891	4,799,000	Eastbrook
Georges Pond	358	145	4,969	6,129,000	Franklin
Upper Patten Pond	338	137	4,268	5,265,000	Ellsworth, Orland, Surry
Burnt Pond	319	129	5,080	6,270,000	Dedham, Otis, Clifton
Long Pond	265	107	3,858	4,759,000	Aurora, Great Pond
Seal Cove Pond	255	103	3,154	3,890,000	Tremont
Eagle Lake	239	97	1,876	2,314,000	T34 MD
Third Pond	236	96	2,578	3,180,000	Blue Hill
Lower Middle Branch Pd	236	96	1,468	1,811,000	Aurora
Echo Lake	236	96	5,065	6,248,000	Mount Desert
Great Pond	234	95	2,570	3,170,000	Franklin
Craig Pond	229	93	7,374	9,096,000	Orland
West Bay Pond	226	91	1,015	1,252,000	Gouldsboro, T7 SD
Middle Chain Pond	225	91	2,165	2,670,000	T4 ND
Long Pond	218	88	2,481	3,060,000	T10 SD
Horseshoe Lake	209	85	2,109	2,601,000	T35 MD
First Pond	207	84	1,772	2,186,000	Blue Hill
Round Pond	201	81	2,422	2,987,000	T7 SD, T10 SD, Steuben
Goose Pond	194	79	2,388	2,946,000	Dedham
Wight Pond	192	78	2,206	2,721,000	Blue Hill, Penobscot
Forbes Pond	192	78	1,069	1,319,000	Gouldsboro
Jordan Pond	186	75	14,097	17,388,000	Mount Desert
Lower Unknown Lake	184	74	1,751	2,160,000	T4 ND
Jacob Buck Pond	182	74	3,447	4,252,000	Bucksport
Hatcase Pond	163	66	5,518	6,806,000	Dedham, Eddington
Long Pond	160	65	2,201	2,715,000	Bucksport
Frost Pond	155	63	1,857	2,291,000	Sedgwick
Rocky Pond	152	62	1,332	1,643,000	Orland
King Pond	147	59	2,018	2,489,000	Great Pond
Little Tunk Pond	143	58	1,608	1,983,000	Sullivan
Thurston Pond	129	52	1,430	1,760,000	Bucksport
Rift Pond	124	50	2,057	2,537,000	Great Pond
Lower Springy Pond	124	50	1,964	2,423,000	Otis, Clifton
Side Pistol Lake	123	50	1,435	1,770,000	T3 ND T4 ND
Lower West Bay Pond	120	49	584	720,000	Gouldsboro
Upper Pistol Lake	119	48	1,265	1,560,000	T4 ND
Leonard Lake	118	48			Ellsworth
Pierce Pond	110	45			Penobscot
Goose Pond	105	42			Brooksville
Somes Pond	103	42	896	1,105,000	Mount Desert
Rocky Pond	96	39	1,598	1,971,000	Otis
Allen Pond	95	38	944	1,164,000	T35 MD
Green Lake #1	94	38	711	877,000	T35 MD
Middle Pistol Lake	88	36	1,094	1,349,000	T4 ND
Halfmile Pond	88	36	2,574	3,175,000	Aurora
Second Pond	86	35	993	1,225,000	Blue Hill
Middle Unknown Lake	84	34	876	1,081,000	T4 ND
Burnt Land Lake	82	33	1,229	1,516,000	T35 MD
Little Webb Pond	81	33			Waltham
Williams Pond	79	32	1,691	2,086,000	Bucksport
Lower Pond (Sabao Lk)	76	31	825	1,018,000	T35 MD
Upper Oxhead Pond	73	30	851	1,050,000	T40 MD
Heart Pond	73	30	1,892	2,334,000	Orland
Fox Pond	73	30	784	967,000	T10 SD
Little Burnt Pond	71	29	610	750,000	Otis
Parker Pond	67	27	654	807,000	Brooksville
Morancy Pond	64	26	451	556,000	Sullivan, T7 SD
Pughole Pond	62	25	681	840,000	T41 MD
Little Rocky Pond	62	25	608	750,000	Dedham, Ellsworth
Hancock Pond	62	25	868	1,071,000	Bucksport
Green Lake #2	61	25	469	579,000	T35 MD
Upper Morrison Pond	60	24	535	660,000	Great Pond
Upper Allen Pond	60	24	438	540,000	T34 MD
Little Long Pond	60	24	1,175	1,449,000	T10 SD
Long Pond	59	24	943	1,163,000	Sullivan
Little Duck Pond	59	24	584	720,000	Ellsworth
Giles Pond	59	24	249	307,000	Aurora
Second Pond	56	23	891	1,099,000	Dedham
Porter Pond	55	22	407	502,000	T3 ND
Lower Allen Pond	55	22	511	630,000	T34 MD
Hothole Pond	54	22	511	630,000	Orland
Holt Pond	53	21	586	723,000	Deer Isle, Stonington
Upper Unknown Lake	51	21	559	690,000	T4 ND
Stiles Lake	50	20	113	139,000	T35 MD
Mill Pond	50	20	511	630,000	Deer Isle
Deer Lake	50	20	407	502,000	T34 MD
Moulton Pond	49	20	950	1,170,000	Bucksport, Dedham
Lower Morrison Pond	47	19	413	509,000	Great Pond
Duck Pond	46	19	450	560,000	Franklin
Hodgdon Pond	45	18	426	525,000	Mount Desert, Tremont
Myrick Lake	44	18	179	221,000	T10 SD
Black Pond	44	18	443	546,000	Sedgwick
Middle Oxhead Pond	43	17	375	463,000	T40 MD
Harriman Pond	41	17	1,868	2,304,000	Dedham
Hamilton Lake	41	17	501	618,000	Bar Harbor
Fourth Pond	39	16	181	223,000	Blue Hill
Upper Hadlock Pond	38	15	427	527,000	Mount Desert
Tilden Pond	38	15	531	655,000	T10 SD
Lower Hadlock Pond	37	15	495	611,000	Mount Desert
Torrey Pond	36	15	106	131,000	Deer Isle
Round Pond	36	15	400	490,000	Mount Desert
Hurd Pond	36	15	327	403,000	Dedham
Spencer Pond	35	14	365	450,000	T3 ND
Mud Pond	35	14	413	509,000	Bucksport
Little Pond	35	14	341	421,000	Franklin
Blunts Pond	35	14	343	423,000	Lamoine
Long Pond	34	14	65	80,000	Mount Desert
Little Pond	34	14	175	216,000	Great Pond
Debec Pond	34	14	292	360,000	Amherst
Jellison Hill Pond	33	13	781	963,000	Amherst
Bubble Pond	33	13	520	640,000	Bar Harbor
Lily Pond	32	13	326	402,000	Deer Isle
Jimmies Pond	32	13	268	331,000	T34 MD
Aunt Betty Pond	32	13	40	49,000	Bar Harbor
Titcomb Pond	31	13	365	450,000	T32 MD
Gold Stream Pond	31	13	297	366,000	Surry
Chalk Pond	31	13	316	390,000	T22 MD Beddington
Lovejoy Pond	29	12	311	384,000	T34 MD
Shillalah Pond	28	11	219	270,000	T10 SD
Partridge Pond	28	11	268	331,000	Amherst
Halfmile Pond	28	11	155	191,000	Amherst
Noyes Pond	27	11	135	167,000	Blue Hill
Mill Pond	27	11	375	463,000	Steuben
Williams Pond	26	11	202	249,000	T28 MD
Twentyeight Pond	26	11			T28 MD
Snake Pond	26	11	260	320,000	Brooksville
Middle Allen Pond	26	11	316	390,000	T34 MD
Campbell Lake	25	10	341	421,000	T35 MD
Witch Hole Pond	24	9.7	238	294,000	Bar Harbor
Little Hatcase Pond	24	9.7			Dedham
Ducktail Pond	24	9.7	268	331,000	Amherst
Burntland Pond	24	9.7	118	146,000	Stonington
Bogus Meadow	24	9.7	243	300,000	T7 SD
Bear Pond	23	9.3	195	241,000	T28 MD
Morancy Meadow Pond	21	8.5	365	450,000	T7 SD
Lower Oxhead Pond	21	8.5	197	243,000	T40 MD
Lower Breakneck Pond	21	8.5			Bar Harbor
Dutton Pond	21	8.5	240	300,000	Amherst
Crystal Pond	21	8.5	209	258,000	T40 MD
Bracey Pond	20	8.1	333	411,000	T34 MD
The Tarn	19	7.7	34	42,000	Bar Harbor
Selmore (Killman) Pond	19	7.7	219	270,000	T4 ND
Lily Pond	19	7.7	195	241,000	Gouldsboro
Birch Harbor Pond	19	7.7	210	260,000	Winter Harbor
Lake Wood	17	6.9	100	120,000	Bar Harbor
Chicken Millpond	17	6.9			Gouldsboro
Rainbow Pond	16	6.5	121	149,000	T10 SD
Little Pickerel Pond	16	6.5	122	150,000	T34 MD
Youngs Pond	15	6.1	113	139,000	Otis
Third Lake	14	5.7			T28 MD
Schoodic Bog	14	5.7			Sullivan
Mitchell Pond	14	5.7	74	91,000	Dedham
Goose Pond	14	5.7	118	146,000	Swans Island
Wormwood Pond	13	5.3	128	158,000	Ellsworth
Trueworthy Pond	13	5.3	97	120,000	T3 ND
Simmons Pond	13	5.3	65	80,000	Hancock
Georges Pond	13	5.3	136	168,000	Deer Isle, Stonington
Pickerel Pond	12	4.9	114	141,000	T32 MD
Little Round Pond	12	4.9	115	142,000	Mount Desert
Little Echo Lake	12	4.9	170	210,000	Mount Desert
Barbless Pond	12	4.9	97	120,000	T7 SD
Anderson Pond	12	4.9	112	138,000	T10 SD
Otter Bog Pond	11	4.5	122	150,000	T9 SD
Mud Pond	11	4.5	122	150,000	Dedham
Loon Pond	11	4.5	105	130,000	T40 MD
Little Round Pond	11	4.5	122	150,000	T7 SD

== Kennebec County ==
Name	Area		Volume		Adjoining towns
Name	acres	ha	acre-feet	m^{3}	Adjoining towns
Great Pond	8,533	3,453	195,099	240,651,000	Belgrade, Rome
Cobbosseecontee Lake	5,516	2,232	127,371	157,110,000	Litchfield, Manchester, Monmouth, West Gardiner, Winthrop
Androscoggin Lake	4,020	1,630	56,736	69,983,000	Leeds, Wayne
China Lake	3,939	1,594	97,286	120,001,000	China, Vassalboro
Messalonskee Lake	3,691	1,494	110,427	136,210,000	Belgrade, Oakland, Sidney
Long Pond	2,557	1,035	73,165	90,248,000	Belgrade, Mount Vernon, Rome
North Pond (Little Pond)	2,531	1,024	1,662	2,050,000	Rome, Mercer, Smithfield
Maranacook Lake	1,844	746	48,020	59,230,000	Readfield, Winthrop
East Pond	1,717	695	27,307	33,683,000	Oakland, Smithfield
Parker Pond	1,524	617	41,636	51,357,000	Fayette, Vienna
Annabessacook Lake	1,415	573	23,892	29,470,000	Monmouth, Winthrop
Webber Pond	1,233	499	18,715	23,085,000	Vassalboro
Threemile Pond	1,174	475	18,106	22,333,000	China, Windsor
Echo Lake (Crotched Pond)	1,109	449	23,134	28,535,000	Fayette, Mount Vernon, Readfield
Salmon Pond (Ellis Pond)	695	281	16,214	20,000,000	Belgrade, Oakland
Torsey (Greeley) Lake	679	275	7,078	8,731,000	Mount Vernon, Readfield
Togus Pond	674	273	11,277	13,910,000	Augusta
Pocasset Lake	605	245	7,225	8,912,000	Wayne
Wilson Pond	588	238	9,510	11,730,000	Monmouth, Wayne, Winthrop
Pattee Pond	523	212	7,238	8,928,000	Winslow
Lower Togus Pond	515	208	2,262	2,790,000	Augusta, Chelsea
Woodbury (Purgatory) Pond (Tacoma Lakes)	513	208	7,296	8,999,000	Litchfield, Monmouth
McGrath Pond	467	189	6,567	8,100,000	Belgrade, Oakland
Flying Pond	403	163	9,617	11,862,000	Vienna
Cochnewagon Pond	394	159	7,208	8,891,000	Monmouth
Lovejoy Pond	379	153	4,365	5,384,000	Fayette, Readfield, Wayne
Lovejoy Pond	379	153	4,471	5,515,000	Albion
David Pond	302	122	2,852	3,518,000	Chesterville, Fayette
Sand Pond (Tacoma Lakes)	279	113	6,798	8,385,000	Litchfield, Monmouth
Upper Narrows Pond	239	97	4,951	6,107,000	Winthrop
Lower Narrows Pond	223	90	5,842	7,206,000	Winthrop
Carlton Pond	223	90	5,270	6,500,000	Readfield, Winthrop
Three Cornered Pond	181	73	1,894	2,336,000	Augusta
Nehumkeag Pond	179	72	1,319	1,627,000	Pittston
Berry Pond	175	71	1,493	1,842,000	Wayne, Winthrop
Spectacle Pond	150	61	4,382	5,405,000	Augusta, Vassalboro
Pickerel Pond	128	52	1,459	1,800,000	Wayne
Tilton Pond	116	47	1,586	1,956,000	Fayette
Dexter Pond	113	46	995	1,227,000	Wayne, Winthrop
Hutchinson (Hudson Sanborn) Pond	105	42	839	1,035,000	Farmingdale, Manchester
Dam Pond	101	41	1,076	1,327,000	Augusta
Apple Valley Lake	101	41	238	294,000	Winthrop
Jamies (Jimmie) Pond	99	40	2,852	3,518,000	Farmingdale, Manchester
Mud Pond	92	37	598	738,000	China, Winslow
Little Cobbosseecontee	91	37	894	1,103,000	Winthrop
Minnehonk Lake	85	34	3,000	3,700,000	Mount Vernon
Buker Pond (Tacoma Lakes)	78	32	696	859,000	Litchfield
Lake Hutchins (Unnamed Pond)	76	31			Oakland
Hales Pond	76	31	929	1,146,000	Fayette
Taylor (Mill) Pond	75	30			Mount Vernon
Horseshoe Pond (Cobbossecontee Stream)	74	30			Litchfield, West Gardiner
Ingham Pond	72	29	378	466,000	Mount Vernon
Egypt Pond	71	29	862	1,063,000	Chesterville, Vienna
Mosher (Lane's) Pond	70	28	945	1,166,000	Fayette
Watson Pond	69	28	713	879,000	Rome
Little Togus Pond	69	28	265	327,000	Augusta
Moose Pond	66	27	365	450,000	Mount Vernon
Mud Pond	65	26	388	479,000	Windsor
Little Purgatory Pond (Tacoma Lakes)	65	26	438	540,000	Litchfield
Savade Pond	62	25	1,072	1,322,000	Windsor
Tolman Pond	57	23	577	712,000	Augusta
Dutton Pond	57	23	870	1,070,000	Albion, China
Kimball Pond	56	23	523	645,000	New Sharon, Vienna
Ward Pond	54	22	894	1,103,000	Sidney
Shed Pond	51	21	219	270,000	Manchester, Readfield
Jimmy Pond (Tacoma Lakes)	51	21	600	740,000	Litchfield
Echo Lake Outlet Pond	51	21			Fayette
Greeley Pond	48	19	308	380,000	Augusta
Whittier Pond	42	17	321	396,000	Vienna
Penny Pond	39	16	433	534,000	Belgrade, Sidney
Loon Pond	39	16	268	331,000	Litchfield
Beagle Club Pond	38	15			Vassalboro
Hamilton Pond	36	15	441	544,000	Belgrade
Silver Lake (Figure Eight Pond)	34	14	495	611,000	Manchester, Sidney
Basin Pond	33	13	1,355	1,671,000	Fayette
Kidder Pond	31	13	208	257,000	Vienna
Moody Pond	30	12	378	466,000	Windsor
Black Pond	30	12	475	586,000	Vienna
Evans Pond	29	12	145	179,000	China
Joe Pond	28	11	304	375,000	Belgrade, Sidney
Whittier Pond	26	11	237	292,000	Rome
Lily Pond	26	11	396	488,000	Sidney
Bog Pond	26	11	246	303,000	Readfield
Tyler Pond	25	10	451	556,000	Manchester
Hopkins Pond	25	10			Mount Vernon
Lily Pond	24	9.7			West Gardiner
Burgess Pond	24	9.7	226	279,000	Fayette
Gould Pond	23	9.3	219	270,000	Sidney
Joices Pond	22	8.9	580	720,000	Pittston, Whitefield
Desert Pond	22	8.9	363	448,000	Mount Vernon
Tinkham Pond	20	8.1	88	109,000	Chelsea
Muldoon Pond	20	8.1			China
Mill Pond	20	8.1			Mount Vernon
Kezar Pond	20	8.1	250	310,000	Winthrop
Anderson (Evers) Pond	20	8.1	281	347,000	Augusta
Mud Pond	18	7.3	170	210,000	Monmouth
Mill Pond	18	7.3	146	180,000	Litchfield
Mill Pond	18	7.3			Readfield
Cranberry Pond	17	6.9	170	210,000	Fayette
Fairbanks Pond	16	6.5	122	150,000	Manchester
Brainard Pond	15	6.1			Readfield
Beaver Pond	15	6.1			Rome
Boody Pond	13	5.3	122	150,000	Vienna
Wellman Pond	12	4.9	112	138,000	Augusta, Windsor
Davis Pond	12	4.9			Vienna
Stuart Pond	11	4.5	118	146,000	Belgrade
Muddy Pond	11	4.5			Wayne

== Knox County ==
Name	Area		Volume		Adjoining towns
Name	acres	ha	acre-feet	m^{3}	Adjoining towns
Megunticook Lake	1,328	537	17,037	21,015,000	Camden, Hope, Lincolnville
Crawford Pond	596	241	9,715	11,983,000	Union, Warren
Alford Lake	585	237	15,689	19,352,000	Hope
Washington Pond	565	229	3,959	4,883,000	Washington
South Pond (Maine)	554	224	5,524	6,814,000	Warren
Sennebec Pond	537	217	9,344	11,526,000	Appleton, Union
Seven Tree Pond	528	214	11,059	13,641,000	Union, Warren
Chickawaukie Pond	354	143	6,852	8,452,000	Rockland, Rockport
North Pond	341	138	5,691	7,020,000	Warren
Hobbs Pond	266	108	2,775	3,423,000	Hope
Round Pond	255	103	3,401	4,195,000	Union
Grassy Pond	190	77	662	817,000	Rockport
Lermond Pond	173	70	2,027	2,500,000	Hope, Union
Carvers Pond	147	59			Vinalhaven
Fish Pond	144	58	680	840,000	Hope
Mirror Lake (Oyster River Pond)	112	45	3,049	3,761,000	Rockport
Fresh Pond	101	41	631	778,000	North Haven
Crystal Pond	99	40	1,120	1,380,000	Washington
White Oak Pond	90	36			Warren
Impoundment (Seabright Pond)	72	29	720	890,000	Camden
Long Pond (Turners Lake)	63	25			Isle Au Haut
Old Harbor Pond	59	24			Vinalhaven
Hosmer Pond	54	22	461	569,000	Camden
Salt Pond (Meduncook River)	44	18			Cushing, Friendship
Mansfield Pond	41	17	211	260,000	Hope
Shermans Mill Pond	36	15	100	120,000	Appleton
Tolman Pond	34	14	235	290,000	Rockport
Lilly Pond	32	13	328	405,000	Camden, Rockport
Newbert Pond	31	13	316	390,000	Appleton
Maces Pond	30	12	168	207,000	Rockport
Lily Pond	29	12	292	360,000	Hope
Fresh Pond	20	8.1	187	231,000	Cushing
Spring (Muddy) Pond	18	7.3	151	186,000	Washington
Crystal Pond	18	7.3			Friendship
Salt Pond	16	6.5			North Haven
Folly Pond	14	5.7			Vinalhaven
The Marsh	12	4.9			Saint George
Iron Pond	12	4.9	194	239,000	Washington
Rocky Pond	11	4.5	97	120,000	Rockport
Howard Pond	11	4.5	74	91,000	Saint George

== Lincoln County ==
Name	Area		Volume		Adjoining towns
Name	acres	ha	acre-feet	m^{3}	Adjoining towns
Damariscotta Lake	4,686	1,896	87,801	108,301,000	Jefferson, Newcastle, Nobleboro
Pemaquid Pond	1,537	622	25,667	31,660,000	Bremen, Damariscotta, Nobleboro, Waldoboro
Clary (Pleasant) Lake	674	273	6,349	7,831,000	Jefferson, Whitefield
Long Pond	504	204	4,288	5,289,000	Windsor, Somerville
Dyer Long Pond	425	172	3,214	3,964,000	Jefferson
Biscay Pond	382	155	11,512	14,200,000	Bristol, Damariscotta
Dresden Bog	337	136	3,331	4,109,000	Alna, Dresden
Duckpuddle Pond	318	129	3,465	4,274,000	Nobleboro, Waldoboro
Medomak Pond	239	97	2,337	2,883,000	Waldoboro
Webber Pond	220	89	3,112	3,839,000	Bremen
Sherman Lake	215	87	531	655,000	Edgecomb
Turner Pond	199	81	388	479,000	Somerville, Palermo
McCurdy Pond	194	79	3,423	4,222,000	Bremen
Paradise (Muddy) Pond	168	68	952	1,174,000	Damariscotta
Sidensparker Pond	154	62	864	1,066,000	Waldoboro
Little Dyer Pond	112	45	900	1,100,000	Jefferson
Knickerbocker Ponds	109	44	1,350	1,670,000	Boothbay
Boyd Pond	94	38			Bristol
Travel Pond	92	37	330	410,000	Jefferson
Kalers Pond	89	36	590	730,000	Waldoboro
Havener Pond	84	34	536	661,000	Warren, Waldoboro
Little Pond	83	34	1,239	1,528,000	Damariscotta
West Harbor Pond	80	32	915	1,129,000	Boothbay Harbor
Gardiner Pond	79	32	896	1,105,000	Wiscasset
Adams Pond	78	32	740	910,000	Boothbay
Little Medomak Pond	77	31	1,002	1,236,000	Waldoboro
Three Corner Pond	74	30	1,004	1,238,000	Jefferson
Cooks Pond	74	30	807	995,000	Nobleboro
Lily Pond	65	26	416	513,000	Edgecomb
James Pond	56	23	535	660,000	Somerville
Deer Meadow Pond	51	21	573	707,000	Jefferson
Weary Pond	43	17	413	509,000	Whitefield
Musquash Pond	30	12	192	237,000	Jefferson
Mill Pond	30	12	292	360,000	Washington, Somerville
Clark Cove Pond	30	12			South Bristol
Wiley Pond	23	9.3	120	150,000	Boothbay
Givens (Longfellow) Pond	23	9.3	195	241,000	Whitefield
Pinkham Pond	22	8.9	175	216,000	Alna
Heal Pond	22	8.9			Westport
Horn Pond	20	8.1	153	189,000	Jefferson
Ross Pond	16	6.5	147	181,000	Bristol
Little Pond	15	6.1	146	180,000	Bristol
French Pond	14	5.7			Somerville
Peter's (Gross) Pond	12	4.9			Waldoboro
Tobias Pond	11	4.5	102	126,000	Nobleboro, Waldoboro

== Oxford County ==
Name	Area		Volume		Adjoining towns
Name	acres	ha	acre-feet	m^{3}	Adjoining towns
Mooselookmeguntic (Cupsuptic) Lake	16,359	6,620	562,121	693,366,000	Rangeley, Rangeley Plt, Adamstown Twp
Umbagog Lake	7,768	3,144	76,192	93,981,000	Magalloway Plt, Upton
Richardson Lakes	7,751	3,137	147,096	181,440,000	Magalloway Plt, Richardsontown Twp, Township C
Aziscohos Lake	6,872	2,781	157,945	194,822,000	Lincoln Plt, Lynchtown Twp, Parkertown Twp
Kezar Lake	2,665	1,078	87,835	108,343,000	Lovell, Stow
Kezar Pond	1,851	749	34,592	42,669,000	Fryeburg
Lovewell Pond	1,129	457	21,144	26,081,000	Fryeburg
Pennesseewassee Lake	987	399	17,815	21,974,000	Norway
Ellis (Roxbury) Pond	919	372	8,411	10,375,000	Byron, Roxbury
Parmachenee Lake	913	369	29,130	35,930,000	Lynchtown Twp, Parmachenee Twp
Hancock Pond	761	308	14,069	17,354,000	Sebago, Denmark
Pleasant Pond	604	244	1,580	1,950,000	Brownfield, Denmark, Fryeburg
Lake Anasagunticook	598	242	16,350	20,170,000	Canton, Hartford
Sturtevant Pond	528	214	13,222	16,309,000	Magalloway Plt
Pond in the River	469	190			Upton C, Surplus Township C
West Richardson Pond	465	188	5,308	6,547,000	Lincoln Plt, Adamstown Twp
South (& Round) Pond	463	187	9,615	11,860,000	Greenwood, Woodstock
Keoka Lake	460	190	11,001	13,570,000	Waterford
Long (McWain) Pond	445	180	10,030	12,370,000	Waterford
Lower Kimball Pond	396	160	7,093	8,749,000	Fryeburg
Worthley Pond	375	152	9,568	11,802,000	Peru
B Pond	357	144	10,013	12,351,000	Upton
Lincoln Pond	327	132	8,929	11,014,000	Parkertown Twp
North Pond	307	124	3,939	4,859,000	Greenwood, Woodstock
Little Ellis Pond	293	119	6,305	7,777,000	Byron
Brownfield Bog	292	118			Brownfield, Fryeburg
Bryant Pond (Lake Christopher)	276	112	9,172	11,313,000	Greenwood, Woodstock
North Pond	273	110	998	1,231,000	Norway
Keewaydin Lake	263	106	4,162	5,134,000	Stoneham
Barker Pond	260	110	4,043	4,987,000	Sebago, Hiram
Bear Pond	250	100	7,986	9,851,000	Waterford
Stearns Pond	248	100	6,590	8,130,000	Sweden
Sand Pond (Walden Pond)	248	100	3,733	4,605,000	Denmark
Colcord Lake	246	100	10,034	12,377,000	Porter
Bickford Pond	214	87	3,796	4,682,000	Porter
Songo Pond	196	79	2,012	2,482,000	Bethel, Albany Twp
Moose Pond	195	79	4,007	4,943,000	Waterford
Keys Pond	191	77	3,306	4,078,000	Sweden
Beaver Pond	191	77	3,492	4,307,000	Magalloway Plt
Quint's Bog	183	74			Brownfield
C Pond (Lake Kashwakamak)	180	73	1,441	1,777,000	C Surplus
Hogan Pond	178	72	2,583	3,186,000	Oxford
Twitchell Pond	169	68	3,176	3,918,000	Greenwood
Whitney Pond	167	68	2,020	2,490,000	Oxford
Marshall (Matthews) Pond	158	64	1,739	2,145,000	Hebron, Oxford
North Pond	156	63	2,850	3,520,000	Buckfield, Sumner
Stanley Pond	146	59	4,287	5,288,000	Hiram Porter
Virginia Lake	145	59	1,533	1,891,000	Stoneham
Sand Pond	136	55	3,637	4,486,000	Norway
Horseshoe Pond	136	55	1,888	2,329,000	Lovell, Stoneham
Howard Pond	128	52	4,145	5,113,000	Hanover
Granger Pond	125	51	1,620	2,000,000	Denmark
Charles Pond	124	50			Fryeburg
Pleasant Pond	119	48	6,875	8,480,000	Sumner
Metallak Pond	116	47	730	900,000	Township C
Heald Pond	106	43	997	1,230,000	Lovell
Cranberry Pond	105	42	973	1,200,000	Magalloway Plt
Big Labrador Pond	105	42	604	745,000	Sumner
Big Concord Pond	105	42	753	929,000	Woodstock
Little Pennesseewassee (Hobbs Pond)	100	40	1,793	2,212,000	Norway
Moose Pond	97	39	524	646,000	West Paris
Hicks Pond	93	38	639	788,000	Greenwood
Middle Pond Kezar	92	37	1,515	1,869,000	Lovell, Stoneham, Waterford
Hutchinson Pond	88	36	1,351	1,666,000	Albany Twp
Pequawket Lake	81	33	759	936,000	Brownfield
Big Clemons Pond	81	33	1,219	1,504,000	Hiram
Beaver Pond	80	32	344	424,000	Denmark
Black Pond	79	32	149	184,000	Porter
E. Richardson Pond #1	78	32	696	859,000	Adamstown Twp
Papoose Pond	70	28	428	528,000	Waterford
Perley Pond	68	28	982	1,211,000	Denmark
Burnt Meadow Pond	65	26	1,119	1,380,000	Brownfield
Indian Pond	61	25	1,746	2,154,000	Greenwood
Farrington Pond	57	23	373	460,000	Lovell
Bog Pond	57	23	584	720,000	Waterford
Shagg Pond	56	23	1,020	1,260,000	Woodstock
Halfmoon Pond	54	22	493	608,000	Carthage, Mexico
Trout Pond	54	22	1,675	2,066,000	Stoneham
Shell Pond	54	22	535	660,000	Stoneham, Stow
Mud Pond	54	22	159	196,000	Greenwood
E. Richardson Pond #2	54	22	416	513,000	Adamstown Twp
Dead Lake	54	22	535	660,000	Fryeburg
Back Pond Kezar	54	22	824	1,016,000	Lovell, Stoneham
Pepperpot Pond	53	21	486	599,000	Adamstown Twp
Impoundment	53	21			Lovell
Trafton Pond	51	21	1,056	1,303,000	Hiram, Porter
Bunganock Pond	51	21	273	337,000	Hartford
Mine Pond	50	20	854	1,053,000	Porter
South Pond	49	20	191	236,000	Buckfield
Little Beaver Pond	48	19	711	877,000	Magalloway Plt
Hall Pond	48	19	431	532,000	Paris
Bog Pond	46	19	438	540,000	Fryeburg
Forest Pond	45	18	513	633,000	Canton
Sunday Pond	44	18			Lynchtown Twp
Long Pond	44	18	310	380,000	Denmark
Jewett Pond Kezar	43	17	563	694,000	Waterford
Spectacle Pond #1	42	17	546	673,000	Porter
Mud Pond Kezar	39	16	586	723,000	Waterford
Green Pond	39	16	515	635,000	Oxford
Barker Pond	39	16	2,213	2,730,000	Bowmantown Twp
Duck Pond	38	15	365	450,000	Waterford
Cushman Pond	37	15	456	562,000	Lovell
Spectacle Pond #2	36	15	272	336,000	Porter
Bradley Pond	35	14	314	387,000	Lovell
Webber Pond	34	14	151	186,000	Sweden
Middle Pond	34	14			Hiram
Proctor Pond	33	13			Stoneham, Albany Twp
Little Moose Pond	33	13			Denmark
Lower Black Pond	30	12	243	300,000	Oxbow Twp
Little Concord Pond	30	12	695	857,000	Woodstock
Little Clemons Pond	30	12	407	502,000	Hiram
Upper Black Pond	29	12	292	360,000	Bowmantown Twp
Rump Pond	29	12	341	421,000	Parmachenee Twp
Swan Pond	28	11	203	250,000	Hartford
Mud Pond	28	11	288	355,000	Norway
Dan Charles Pond	28	11	195	241,000	Lovell
Chalk Pond	26	11	255	315,000	Albany Twp
Patte Mill Pond	25	10	268	331,000	Albany Twp
Cat Pond	25	10	287	354,000	Fryeburg
Sunday Pond	24	9.7	586	723,000	Magalloway Plt
Clays Pond	24	9.7	271	334,000	Fryeburg
Bunker Pond	24	9.7	243	300,000	Roxbury
Abbotts Pond	24	9.7	243	300,000	Sumner
Overset Pond	22	8.9	338	417,000	Greenwood
Mollidgewock Pond	21	8.5	116	143,000	Upton
Little Papoose Pond	20	8.1	188	232,000	Albany Twp
Bryant Pond	20	8.1	202	249,000	Hiram
Broken Bridge Pond	20	8.1	255	315,000	Albany Twp
Black Pond	20	8.1	62	76,000	Fryeburg
Weymouth Pond	19	7.7	175	216,000	Stoneham
Mt Zircon Reservoir	19	7.7	185	228,000	Rumford
Joes Pond	19	7.7	182	224,000	Rumford
Boston Pond	19	7.7	187	231,000	Denmark
Plain Pond	18	7.3	242	299,000	Porter
Mud (Mirror) Pond	17	6.9	195	241,000	Poland, Oxford
Furlong Pond	17	6.9	170	210,000	Greenwood, Norway, Albany Twp
Pickerel Pond	16	6.5	389	480,000	Denmark
Kneeland Pond	16	6.5	151	186,000	Albany Twp
Hunt Pond	16	6.5	139	171,000	Fryeburg
Horseshoe Pond	16	6.5	343	423,000	Denmark
Black Pond	16	6.5	170	210,000	Sweden
Trout Pond	15	6.1	170	210,000	Mason Twp
Speck Pond #2	15	6.1	146	180,000	Norway
Little Labrador Pond	15	6.1	123	152,000	Sumner
Horseshoe Pond	15	6.1	158	195,000	Andover
Aziscohos Pond	15	6.1	100	120,000	Magalloway Plt
Abbie Pond	15	6.1	122	150,000	Bowmantown Twp
Round Pond	14	5.7	140	170,000	Albany Twp
Otter Pond	14	5.7	159	196,000	Parmachenee Twp
Jims Pond	14	5.7	134	165,000	Newry
Jaybird Pond	14	5.7	43	53,000	Hiram, Porter
Horseshoe Pond #3	14	5.7	136	168,000	Fryeburg
Davis Pond	14	5.7	146	180,000	Rumford
Round Pond	12	4.9	146	180,000	Norway
Paine Pond	12	4.9	124	153,000	Paris
Northeast Pond	11	4.5	107	132,000	Hartford
Horseshoe Pond #1	11	4.5	136	168,000	Fryeburg
Cushman Pond	11	4.5	97	120,000	Sumner
Chapman Pond	11	4.5	65	80,000	Porter
Birch Pond	11	4.5	109	134,000	Roxbury

== Penobscot County ==
Name	Area		Volume		Adjoining towns
Name	acres	ha	acre-feet	m^{3}	Adjoining towns
Pemadumcook Chain of Lakes (Ambajejus, Pemadumcook, North Twin, South Twin, Elbow)	18,670	7,560	490,183	604,632,000	T3 Indian Purchase Twp, T4 Indian Purchase Twp
West Grand Lake (Pug Lake Junior Bay)	14,467	5,855	555,978	685,789,000	T5 R1 NBPP, Grand Lake Stream Plt, T5 ND BPP
Millinocket Lake	8,571	3,469	179,982	222,005,000	T1 R8 WELS, T2 R8 NWP, T1 R9 WELS, T2 R9 WELS
Sysladobsis Lake	5,430	2,200	123,507	152,344,000	T4 ND, Lakeville, T5 ND BPP
First Matagamon Lakes	4,868	1,970	80,878	99,762,000	T6 R8 WELS, Trout Brook Twp
Pushaw Lake	4,680	1,890	53,102	65,500,000	Glenburn, Hudson, Old Town, Orono
Sebasticook Lake	4,537	1,836	89,666	110,601,000	Newport
Junior Lake	4,000	1,600	78,081	96,311,000	Lakeville, T5 R1 NBPP
Cold Stream Pond	3,619	1,465	145,697	179,715,000	Enfield, Lincoln, Lowell
Grand Lake Seboeis	2,602	1,053	109,085	134,554,000	T7 R7 WELS, T8 R7 WELS
South Branch Lake	1,981	802	22,172	27,349,000	Seboeis Plt, T2 R8 NWP
Dolby Pond	1,941	785			East Millinocket, Grindstone Twp, TA R7 WELS
Scraggly Lake	1,640	660	16,457	20,299,000	T5 R1 NBPP, T6 R1 NBPP
Endless Lake	1,439	582	25,262	31,160,000	T3 R9 NWP
Millimagassett Lake	1,399	566	33,013	40,721,000	T7 R8 WELS
Pleasant (Stetson) Lake	1,245	504	5,644	6,962,000	Stetson
Chemo Pond	1,223	495	12,470	15,380,000	Bradley, Clifton, Eddington
Lake Wassookeag (Dexter Pond)	1,152	466	31,713	39,117,000	Dexter
Middle Jo-Mary Lake	1,147	464	6,973	8,601,000	T4 Indian Purchase Twp, TA R10 WELS
East Branch Lake	1,122	454	10,823	13,350,000	T3 R9 NWP
Mattamiscontis Lake	1,080	440	10,321	12,731,000	T2 R9 NWP, T3 R9 NWP
Upper Sysladobsis Lake	1,061	429	10,826	13,354,000	Lakeville
Quakish Lake	1,021	413			T3 Indian Purchase Twp, T3 Indian Purchase Twp
Brewer Lake	958	388	23,029	28,406,000	Bucksport, Holden, Orrington
Saponac Pond	894	362	6,996	8,629,000	Burlington, Grand Falls Twp
Eskutassis (Escutassis) Pond	885	358	9,451	11,658,000	Burlington, Lowell
Big Madagascal Pond	868	351	10,384	12,808,000	Burlington, T3 R1 NBPP
Scraggly Lake	836	338	16,408	20,239,000	T7 R8 WELS
Mattanawcook Pond	830	340	6,062	7,477,000	Lincoln
Caribou Egg & Long Ponds	823	333	5,855	7,222,000	Lincoln
Umcolcus Lake	730	300	6,587	8,125,000	T7 R5 WELS, T8 R5 WELS, T7 R6 WELS, T8 R6 WELS
Upper Pond	730	300	7,277	8,976,000	Burlington, Lincoln
Snowshoe Lake	676	274	8,347	10,296,000	T7 R7 WELS
Plymouth Pond	658	266	1,719	2,120,000	Plymouth
Lower Shin Pond	657	266	6,494	8,010,000	Mount Chase, T5 R7 WELS
Cedar Lake	654	265	10,163	12,536,000	Long A Twp, T3 R9 NWP
Katahdin Lake	650	260	7,116	8,777,000	T3 R8 WELS
Nollesemic Lake	649	263	6,356	7,840,000	Hopkins Academy Grant Twp, Long A Twp, T3 R9 NWP
Upper Cold Stream Pond	648	262	16,905	20,852,000	Burlington, Lincoln
Number Three Pond	642	260	4,603	5,678,000	Lee, T3 R1 NBPP
Hay Lake	625	253	8,556	10,554,000	T6 R8 WELS
Salmon Stream Lake	622	252	4,337	5,350,000	T1 R6 WELS
Upper Shin Pond	589	238	9,972	12,300,000	Mount Chase, T6 R6 WELS
Silver (Mattakeunk) Lake	530	210	7,144	8,812,000	Lee
Fields Pond	518	210	1,923	2,372,000	Orrington
Eddington (Davis) Pond	503	204	2,960	3,650,000	Eddington, Holden
Hermon Pond	462	187	4,169	5,142,000	Hermon
Pleasant (Mud) Lake	455	184	2,598	3,205,000	Moro Plt, T6 R6 WELS
Little Pushaw Pond	424	172	4,072	5,023,000	Hudson
Folsom Pond	385	156	2,327	2,870,000	Lincoln
Keg Lake	371	150	5,236	6,459,000	Lakeville
Mud (Perch) Pond	366	148	3,381	4,170,000	Old Town
Etna (Nawlombages Parker) Pond	362	146	1,936	2,388,000	Carmel, Etna, Stetson
Holbrook Pond	347	140	4,382	5,405,000	Eddington, Holden
Olamon Stream Deadwater	300	120			Greenbush
Cut Lake	296	120	817	1,008,000	T7 R6 WELS T8 R6 WELS
Flatiron Pond	284	115	3,628	4,475,000	T3 R9 NWP
Lombard Lake	277	112	3,756	4,633,000	Lakeville
Lunksoos Lake	271	110	1,993	2,458,000	T4 R7 WELS
Little Mattamiscontis Lake	263	106	2,148	2,650,000	T3 R9 NWP
Duck Lake	262	106	3,677	4,536,000	Lakeville
Bottle Lake	258	104	3,601	4,442,000	Lakeville
Ferguson Lake	253	102	2,456	3,029,000	Millinocket
Horseshoe Lake	248	100	2,456	3,029,000	Lakeville T5 R1, NBPP T5 ND BPP
Mud Pond	241	98	2,456	3,029,000	Drew Plt
Crooked Pond	240	97	2,170	2,680,000	Lincoln
Jerry Pond	236	96	1,811	2,234,000	T5 R7 WELS
Mud Pond	233	94	2,505	3,090,000	T6 R8 WELS
White Horse Lake	227	92	1,357	1,674,000	T7 R7 WELS
Corundel Bog	225	91			Corinna
La Pomkeag Lake	217	88	345	426,000	T8 R6 WELS, T8 R7 WELS
Cambolasse Pond	211	85	2,881	3,554,000	Lincoln
Rush Pond	208	84	541	667,000	Herseytown Twp
Snag (Stump) Pond	202	82	1,141	1,407,000	Lincoln
Center Pond	202	82	1,336	1,648,000	Lincoln
Smith Pond	198	80	1,563	1,928,000	T3 Indian Purchase Twp
Nokomis Pond	186	75	1,753	2,162,000	Newport, Palmyra
Pickett Mountain Pond	182	74	532	656,000	Moro Plt, T6 R6 WELS
Sawtelle Deadwater	181	73	1,211	1,494,000	T6 R7 WELS
Sawtelle Pond	165	67	1,703	2,101,000	T7 R7 WELS, T7 R8 WELS
Shad Pond	161	65			Millinocket
Partridge Brk Flowage	154	62	1,240	1,530,000	East Millinocket
Parks Pond	154	62	2,429	2,996,000	Clifton
Gristmill Pond	149	60	1,240	1,530,000	Lowell
Pond Farm Pond	139	56	1,393	1,718,000	Howland
Norway Lake	130	53	1,291	1,592,000	T5 R1 NBPP
Garland Pond	128	52	462	570,000	Garland
Little Salmon Strm Lk	127	51			T1 R6 WELS
Round (Grey) Pond	125	51	1,219	1,504,000	Plymouth
Swetts (Sweets) Pond	124	50	867	1,069,000	Orrington
Lowell Pond	122	49	174	215,000	Carroll Plt, Springfield
Bowlin Pond	120	49	785	968,000	T5 R8 WELS
Hay Pond	119	48	1,008	1,243,000	T6 R8 WELS
Little Eskutassis Pond	117	47	1,240	1,530,000	Burlington
Puffers Pond (Echo Lake)	115	47	1,130	1,390,000	Dexter
Green Pond	114	46	1,186	1,463,000	Lee T3 R1 NBPP
Mill Privilege Lake	112	45	1,270	1,570,000	Carroll Plt, T5 R1 NBPP
Fitts Pond	112	45	1,046	1,290,000	Clifton, Eddington
Weymouth Pond	108	44	496	612,000	Corinna, Saint Albans
Lower Pug Lake	104	42	1,544	1,904,000	Lakeville
Hammond Pond	100	40			Hampden
Wadleigh Pond	97	39	539	665,000	T4 Indian Purchase Twp
Lower La Pomkeag Lake	95	38	434	535,000	T8 R7 WELS
Carey Lake	90	36	900	1,100,000	T8 R6 WELS
Davidson Pond	84	34	851	1,050,000	Herseytown Twp
Mountain Catcher Pond	81	33	760	940,000	T6 R8 WELS, Trout Brook Twp
Little Round Pond	81	33	730	900,000	Lincoln
Holland Pond	80	32	439	541,000	Alton
Pickerel Pond	78	32	233	287,000	Alton
Greenbush Swamp	78	32			Exeter
Alder Stream Pond	73	30	710	880,000	Corinna
Marble Pond	70	28	730	900,000	T5 R8 WELS
Hot Pond	68	28	250	310,000	T6 R6 WELS, T6 R7 WELS
Chase Bog Pond	67	27			Monroe
Upper Pug Lake	66	27	550	680,000	Lakeville
Davis (Wapiti) Pond	65	26	1,104	1,362,000	T5 R7 WELS
Jerry Pond	64	26	501	618,000	Millinocket TA R7 WELS
Medunkenuk Lake	62	25	360	440,000	T2 R9 NWP
Seboeis Deadwater	60	24			T6 R7 WELS, T7 R7 WELS
Peaked Mountain Pond	59	24	657	810,000	T4 R7 WELS
Wadleigh Deadwater	58	23			T1 R6 WELS
Gilmore Meadows Pond	52	21			Newburgh
Weir Pond	51	21	488	602,000	Lee, T3 R1 NBPP
Kimball Pond	49	20	576	710,000	T5 R8 WELS
George Pond	49	20	269	332,000	Hermon
Cranberry Pond #1	49	20	491	606,000	T8 R6 WELS
Patten Pond	48	19	328	405,000	Hampden
Mower Pond	48	19	354	437,000	Corinna
Bog Pond	48	19	438	540,000	T3 R9 NWP
Upper West Ragged Pond	47	19	389	480,000	T4 Indian Purchase Twp
Upper Springy Pond	47	19	365	450,000	Clifton
Tracy Pond	47	19	233	287,000	Hermon
Eagle Pond	47	19	486	599,000	Drew Plt
Merrill Pond	44	18	608	750,000	Lee
Jones Pond	44	18	112	138,000	T7 R8 WELS, T8 R8 WELS
Ireland Pond	43	17	521	643,000	T7 R8 WELS
Soldier Pond	42	17	460	570,000	Soldiertown Twp
Webster Pond	39	16	389	480,000	Webster Plt
Atwood Pond	39	16	486	599,000	T5 R8 WELS
Lost Pond	37	15	625	771,000	T7 R7 WELS
Little Madagascal Pond	37	15			T3 R1 NBPP
Ben Annis Pond	37	15	189	233,000	Hermon
Morrell Pond	33	13	389	480,000	T6 R8 WELS, T7 R8 WELS
Middle Springy Pond	33	13	365	450,000	Clifton
Lower West Ragged Pond	33	13	292	360,000	T4 Indian Purchase Twp
Brooks Pond	33	13	122	150,000	Corinna
Trout Pond	32	13	195	241,000	Lowell
Lincoln Pond	32	13	292	360,000	T4 Indian Purchase Twp
Lane Brook Pond	32	13	318	392,000	T6 R6 WELS
Cranberry Pond	32	13	268	331,000	Clifton
West Garland Pond	31	13	390	480,000	Garland
Dwinal Pond	31	13			Lee Winn
Back Settlement Pond	30	12	243	300,000	Mattawamkeag
Boody Pond	29	12	294	363,000	T8 R8 WELS
Wiley Pond	28	11	210	260,000	Patten
Lower East Ragged Pond	28	11	292	360,000	T4 Indian Purchase Twp
Little Messer Pond	28	11	48	59,000	T5 R8 WELS
Little Bowlin Pond	28	11	341	421,000	T5 R7 WELS
Messer Pond	26	11	260	320,000	T5 R8 WELS
Mud Pond	24	9.7	219	270,000	Stetson
Mud Brook Flowage	24	9.7	486	599,000	T2 R8 WELS
McGilvry Pond	24	9.7	230	280,000	T8 R6 WELS
Green Pond	24	9.7	292	360,000	T7 R8 WELS
Center Pond	24	9.7	146	180,000	Dixmont
Holt Pond	23	9.3	97	120,000	Springfield
Gardner Pond	23	9.3	219	270,000	T5 R7 WELS
Little Smith Pond	22	8.9			T1 R8 WELS
Cranberry Pond #2	22	8.9	228	281,000	T8 R6 WELS
Black Cat Pond	22	8.9	28	35,000	T8 R6 WELS
Cedar Swamp Pond	20	8.1	146	180,000	Clifton
Carry Pond	19	7.7	55	68,000	T8 R7 WELS
Upper Jo-Mary Ddwtr	18	7.3			T4 Indian Purchase Twp
Isthmus Pond	18	7.3	182	224,000	T8 R8 WELS
Deasey Pond	18	7.3	197	243,000	T3 R7 WELS
Spring Pond	17	6.9	70	86,000	T6 R7 WELS
Soule Pond	17	6.9	195	241,000	T7 R8 WELS
Little Mud Pond	17	6.9	146	180,000	T6 R8 WELS
Otter Chain Pond #10	16	6.5			Milford
Soper Logan	15	6.1			T6 R8 WELS
Lower Deadwater	15	6.1			T3 R9 NWP
Hathorn Pond	15	6.1	154	190,000	T4 R8 WELS
Trout Pond	14	5.7	91	112,000	Soldiertown Twp
Rocky Pond	14	5.7			T3 R8 WELS
Pug Pond	14	5.7	62	76,000	Alton
Olamon Pond	14	5.7	146	180,000	Greenfield Twp
Little Soldier Pond	14	5.7	158	195,000	Soldiertown Twp
Ackley Pond	14	5.7			Mount Chase
Round Pond	13	5.3	138	170,000	Lee T3 R7 WELS
Rocky Bog	13	5.3			T3 R9 NWP
Mill (Merrill) Pond	13	5.3	268	331,000	Lee
Little Mtn Catcher Pd	13	5.3	122	150,000	T6 R8 WELS
Egg Pond	13	5.3	195	241,000	Lee
Chamberlain Lake	13	5.3	195	241,000	T7 R6 WELS
Wellmans Pond	12	4.9	114	141,000	Dixmont
Millinocket Disposal Pond	12	4.9			Millinocket
George Pond	12	4.9	122	150,000	Holden
Upper East Ragged Pond	11	4.5	122	150,000	T4 Indian Purchase Twp
Otter Chain Pond #4	11			Milford	
Little Burnt Pond	11	4.5	146	180,000	Clifton
Hobart Pond	11	4.5	118	146,000	T6 R7 WELS

== Piscataquis County ==
Name	Area		Volume		Adjoining towns
Name	acres	ha	acre-feet	m^{3}	Adjoining towns
Moosehead Lake	75,471	30,542	4,210	5,190,000,069	Greenville and 16 other townships
Chesuncook Lake: Moose Pond	25,183	10,191	136,667	168,576,000	Chesuncook Twp, T2 R12 WELS, T3 R11 WELS, T3 R12 WELS
Chamberlain Lake	10,932	4,424	473,380	583,910,000	Eagle Lake Twp, T6 R11 WELS, T6 R12 WELS, T7 R11 WELS
Big Eagle Lake	9,542	3,862	220,866	272,434,000	Eagle Lake Twp, Soper Mountain Twp, T7 R12 WELS
Schoodic Lake	7,021	2,841	505,377	623,373,000	Brownville, Lake View Plt, T4 R9 NWP
Sebec Lake	6,362	2,575	283,337	349,491,000	Bowerbank, Dover-Foxcroft, Sebec, Willimantic
Seboeis Lake	4,913	1,988	76,905	94,861,000	Lake View Plt, T4 R9 NWP
Caucomgomoc Lake	4,594	1,859	103,839	128,084,000	T6 R14 WELS, T6 R15 WELS, T7 R14 WELS, T7 R15 WELS
Allagash Lake	4,210	1,700	151,374	186,717,000	T7 R14 WELS, T8 R14 WELS
Churchill (Heron) Lake	3,706	1,500	55,214	68,105,000	T9 R12 WELS, T10 R12 WELS
Lobster Lake	3,380	1,370	88,897	109,653,000	East Middlesex Canal Grant Twp, Lobster Twp
First Roach Pond	3,320	1,340	176,410	217,600,000	Frenchtown Twp
Chemquasabamticook Lake	2,925	1,184	99,975	123,317,000	T9 R14 WELS, T9 R15 WELS, T10 R15 WELS
Millinocket Lake	2,730	1,100	852	1,051,000	T7 R9 WELS, T7 R10 WELS, T8 R9 WELS
Ragged Lake	2,605	1,054	42,029	51,842,000	T2 R13 WELS, T3 R13 WELS
Telos Lake (Round Pond)	2,323	940	57,338	70,725,000	T5 R11 WELS, T6 R11 WELS
Lower Jo-Mary Lake	1,889	764	35,584	43,892,000	T4 Indian Purchase Twp, TA R10 WELS, T1 R9 WELS
Upper Jo-Mary Lake	1,847	747	58,496	72,154,000	Veazie Gore, TA R10 WELS, TB R10 WELS
Black Pond	1,737	703	14,252	17,580,000	Chesuncook Twp, T5 R14 WELS, T6 R13 WELS, T6 R14 WELS
Rainbow Lake	1,626	658	63,348	78,139,000	Rainbow Twp
Munsungan Lake	1,600	650	69,087	85,218,000	T8 R9 WELS, T8 R10 WELS, T9 R10 WELS
Umbazooksus Lake	1,572	636	11,778	14,528,000	T6 R13 WELS
Lower Wilson Pond	1,414	572	40,050	49,400,000	Greenville
Nesowadnehunk (Sourdnahunk) Lake	1,369	554	23,869	29,442,000	Nesourdnahunk Twp, T4 R10 WELS, T4 R11 WELS,
Mud Pond	1,298	525	5,291	6,526,000	T6 R12 WELS
Indian Pond	1,223	495	22,793	28,115,000	T7 R12 WELS
Harrington Lake	1,219	493	37,331	46,047,000	T3 R11 WELS, T4 R11 WELS
Brandy Pond	1,214	491	6,397	7,891,000	Chesuncook Twp, T5 R14 WELS
Lake Onawa (Ship Pond)	1,192	482	26,679	32,908,000	Willimantic, Elliotsville Twp
Shallow Lake	1,115	451	26,997	33,300,000	T7 R13 WELS, T7 R14 WELS
Loon Lake	1,097	444	19,268	23,767,000	T6 R15 WELS
Spencer Pond	1,065	431	4,942	6,096,000	East Middlesex Canal Grant Twp, Spencer Bay Twp
Boyd Lake	1,064	431	9,768	12,049,000	Orneville Twp
Upper Wilson Pond	987	399	13,053	16,101,000	Greenville, Bowdoin College Grant West Twp
Nahmakanta Lake	986	399	47,774	58,928,000	Rainbow Twp, T1 R11 WELS
Third Debsconeag Lake	970	390	57,736	71,216,000	T1 R10 WELS, T2 R10 WELS
Big Pleasant Lake	964	390	587	724,000	T9 R11 WELS, T10 R11 WELS
Haymock Lake	929	376	25,699	31,699,000	T7 R11 WELS, T8 R11 WELS
Spider Lake	917	371	23,141	28,544,000	T9 R11 WELS, T9 R12 WELS
East Pond (Ebeemee Lk Horseshoe Pd Pearl Pd)	905	366	850	1,050,000	Brownville, T5 R9 NWP
Second Roach Pond	872	353	16,553	20,418,000	Shawtown Twp, T1 R12 WELS
Longley Pond	759	307	3,547	4,375,000	T6 R13 WELS
Hurd Pond	666	270	27,514	33,938,000	T2 R10 WELS
Long Pond	644	261	10,937	13,491,000	Bowdoin College Grant East Twp, Bowdoin College Grant West Twp
Big Houston (Huston) Pond	644	261	20,220	24,940,000	Katahdin Iron Works Twp, T7 R9 NWP
Lake Hebron	638	258	10,763	13,276,000	Monson
Priestly Lake	628	254	10,984	13,549,000	T10 R13 WELS
Clear Lake	626	253	16,205	19,989,000	T10 R11 WELS
B Pond	610	250	8,287	10,222,000	TB R11 WELS
Cuxabexis Lake	597	242	3,108	3,834,000	T5 R12 WELS, T6 R12 WELS
Cliff Lake	556	225	8,887	10,962,000	Soper Mountain Twp, T9 R12 WELS
Third Roach Pond	554	224	6,664	8,220,000	Shawtown Twp
Debsconeag Deadwater	536	217			T1 R9 WELS, T2 R9 WELS, T2 R10 WELS
Fitzgerald (Mountain View) Pond	533	216	4,537	5,596,000	Big Moose Twp
Webster Lake	515	208	10,471	12,916,000	T6 R10 WELS, T6 R11 WELS
Manhancock Pond (Manhanock)	475	192	2,875	3,546,000	Parkman, Sangerville
Passamagamet (Passamagmoc) Lake	467	189	5,687	7,015,000	T1 R9 WELS
Duck Pond	466	189	4,621	5,700,000	T4 R12 WELS, T5 R12 WELS
Daggett Pond	460	190	2,810	3,470,000	T7 R14 WELS
Poland Pond	455	184	2,758	3,402,000	T7 R14 WELS, T7 R15 WELS
Mud Pond	448	181	3,843	4,740,000	T4 R12 WELS
Prong Pond	447	181	3,090	3,810,000	Beaver Cove, Greenville
Fifth Musquacook Lake	436	176	921	1,136,000	T10 R11 WELS
Piper Pond	423	171	8,581	10,585,000	Abbot
Chase Lake	420	170	6,057	7,471,000	T9 R10 WELS
Burnham Pond	413	167	4,183	5,160,000	Big Moose Twp
Harrow Lake	404	163	4,881	6,021,000	T10 R11 WELS, T10 R12 WELS
Third Lake	403	163	5,107	6,299,000	T7 R10 WELS
Mooseleuk Lake	397	161	2,446	3,017,000	T10 R9 WELS
Lower Togue Pond	396	160	6,253	7,713,000	T2 R9 WELS
First Buttermilk Pond	390	160	3,770	4,650,000	Bowerbank
Center Pond	376	152	3,286	4,053,000	Sangerville
Round Pond	370	150	3,697	4,560,000	T7 R14 WELS
Long Pond	370	150	7,667	9,457,000	TA R11 WELS, T1 R11 WELS
First Debsconeag Lake	361	146	19,744	24,354,000	T2 R10 WELS
Branns Mill Pond (North)	352	142	993	1,225,000	Garland, Dover-Foxcroft
Monson Pond	351	142	10,074	12,426,000	Monson
Crawford Pond	340	140	11,840	14,600,000	TA R11 WELS
Big Benson Pond	332	134	7,962	9,821,000	Bowerbank, Willimantic, T7 R9 NWP
Crescent Pond	318	129	7,305	9,011,000	T9 R15 WELS
Chesuncook Pond	299	121	3,914	4,828,000	Rainbow Twp, T3 R11 WELS
Indian (Dam) Pond	290	120	3,730	4,600,000	T7 R9 NWP
Penobscot Pond	284	115	2,692	3,321,000	T1 R11 WELS, T1 R12 WELS
Big Beaver Pond	283	115	2,162	2,667,000	T7 R9 WELS
Silver Lake	279	113			Katahdin Iron Works Twp
Big Hurd Pond	276	112	2,418	2,983,000	T6 R15 WELS
Pockwockamus Deadwater	275	111			T2 R9 WELS, T2 R10 WELS
Big Indian Pond	269	109	8,359	10,311,000	Little Moose Twp
Upper Russell Pond	268	108	2,776	3,424,000	T9 R14 WELS
Snake Pond	265	107	3,896	4,806,000	T7 R11 WELS
Little Shallow Lake	265	107	3,016	3,720,000	T7 R14 WELS
Whetstone Pond	256	104	11,727	14,465,000	Kingsbury Plt, Blanchard Twp
Rowe Pond	249	101	2,456	3,029,000	T7 R15 WELS
Fourth Roach Pond (Fourth Kokadjo Lake)	248	100	3,548	4,376,000	Shawtown Twp
Cooper Pond	242	98	2,109	2,601,000	TA R10 WELS
Wadleigh Pond	239	97	7,127	8,791,000	T1 R11 WELS
Little Lobster Lake	238	96	3,352	4,135,000	Lobster Twp
Rum Pond	232	94	7,262	8,958,000	Greenville, Bowdoin College Grant West Twp
Island (Chase) Pond	230	93	2,811	3,467,000	T9 R10 WELS, T10 R10 WELS
Upper Togue Pond	223	90	3,266	4,029,000	T2 R9 WELS
Soper Pond	223	90	424	523,000	Soper Mountain Twp
Mud Pond	223	90	2,456	3,029,000	Beaver Cove
Fourth Debsconeag Lake	223	90	12,793	15,780,000	T1 R10 WELS, T1 R11 WELS
Holbrook Pond	222	90	8,975	11,070,000	Rainbow Twp, T3 R11 WELS
Cassidy Deadwater	222	90	2,311	2,851,000	T4 R15 WELS
Mud Pond	218	88	2,213	2,730,000	TA R10 WELS, T1 R10 WELS
First Davis Pond	216	87	4,464	5,506,000	Guilford
Lucky Pond	213	86	227	280,000	Spencer Bay Twp
Big Greenwood Pond	210	85	6,966	8,592,000	Willimantic, Elliotsville Twp
Burden Pond	202	82	1,948	2,403,000	Bowerbank
Second (& Third) West Branch Pd	199	81	886	1,093,000	Shawtown Twp
Frost Pond	199	81	2,798	3,451,000	T3 R11 WELS, T3 R12 WELS
Henderson Pond	196	79	5,688	7,016,000	TA R11 WELS
Big Pleasant Pond	194	79	3,750	4,630,000	TA R11 WELS
Upper Ebeemee Lake	192	78			T4 R9 NWP
Coffeelos (Coffalos) Pond	191	77	1,758	2,168,000	T6 R11 WELS
Buttermilk Pond	183	74	1,727	2,130,000	Bowerbank
Shirley Bog (West)	179	72	2,700	3,300,000	Shirley, Little Moose Twp
Harlow Pond	179	72	801	988,000	Parkman
Spectacle Ponds	178	72	1,745	2,152,000	Monson
Deer Pond	178	72	3,007	3,709,000	T3 R13 WELS
Little Hurd Pond	175	71	1,775	2,189,000	T6 R15 WELS
Second Debsconeag Lake	172	70	2,733	3,371,000	T2 R10 WELS
Wassataquoik Lake	171	69	5,918	7,300,000	T4 R9 WELS, T4 R10 WELS
Horseshoe Pond	171	69	2,051	2,530,000	Bowdoin College Grant West Twp
Hale Pond	170	69	2,151	2,653,000	T2 R10 WELS
Mud Pond	169	68	1,703	2,101,000	T9 R14 WELS T9 R15 WELS
Pine Stream Flowage	167	68			T3 R13 WELS T4 R13 WELS
Pillsbury Pond	164	66			T8 R11 WELS
Upper Ellis Pond	163	66	218	269,000	T7 R14 WELS
Wadleigh Pond	160	65	2,821	3,480,000	T8 R15 WELS
Narrow Pond	152	62	349	430,000	T8 R14 WELS
Little Benson Pond	149	60	1,874	2,312,000	Bowerbank
Big Pine Pond	148	60	1,655	2,041,000	T3 R13 WELS
River Pond	146	59	1,216	1,500,000	T2 R9 WELS
Pollywog Pond	146	59	2,158	2,662,000	Rainbow Twp, T1 R11 WELS, T1 R12 WELS
Carpenter Pond	144	58	1,598	1,971,000	T7 R11 WELS
Big Lyford Pond	142	57	1,823	2,249,000	Frenchtown Twp, Shawtown Twp
Trout Pond	139	56	1,437	1,773,000	Shawtown Twp
Hardy Pond	139	56	1,240	1,530,000	Lake View Plt
Thissell Pond	138	56	2,858	3,525,000	T5 R11 WELS
Little Leadbetter Pond	138	56	1,435	1,770,000	T7 R11 WELS
Leadbetter Pond	138	56	1,338	1,650,000	T7 R12 WELS
Lower Russell Pond	136	55	1,378	1,700,000	T9 R14 WELS
Johnson Pond	135	55	2,156	2,659,000	T8 R14 WELS
Bear Pond	130	53	1,362	1,680,000	T6 R15 WELS
Chandler Pond	127	51	1,171	1,444,000	T7 R10 WELS, T8 R10 WELS
Black Pond	127	51	1,240	1,530,000	T1 R12 WELS
Echo Lake	124	50	1,908	2,353,000	T9 R11 WELS
Little Indian Pond	121	49	394	486,000	T7 R12 WELS
Hudson Pond	121	49	562	693,000	T6 R10 WELS
Foss Pond	117	47	2,832	3,493,000	Kingsbury Plt
First West Branch Pond	115	47	774	955,000	Shawtown Twp
Little Beaver Pond	112	45	1,225	1,511,000	T7 R9 WELS
Big Rocky Pond	110	45	315	389,000	TA R11 WELS
Lower South Branch Pd	108	44	3,568	4,401,000	T5 R9 WELS
Yoke Ponds	107	43	812	1,002,000	TA R11 WELS
Otter Pond	106	43	154	190,000	T8 R14 WELS
Compass Pond	106	43	973	1,200,000	T2 R9 WELS
Bottle Pond	104	42	876	1,081,000	T2 R9 WELS
Salmon Pond	103	42	1,046	1,290,000	T4 R13 WELS
Little Nesowadnehunk (Sourdnahunk) Lake	103	42	824	1,016,000	T5 R11 WELS
Female Pond	99	40	1,726	2,129,000	T1 R12 WELS
Brown Pond	98	40	251	310,000	T8 R9 WELS
Upper South Branch Pd	96	39	3,897	4,807,000	T5 R9 WELS
Pleasant Pond	96	39	900	1,100,000	Orneville Twp
Ordway Pond	96	39	924	1,140,000	Shirley
Big Reed Pond	96	39	2,026	2,499,000	T8 R10 WELS
Leadbetter Pond	95	38	214	264,000	T9 R11 WELS
Kidney Pond	95	38	747	921,000	T3 R10 WELS
Big Moose Pond	92	37	2,616	3,227,000	Little Moose Twp
Upper Portage Pond	89	36	302	373,000	T9 R11 WELS
Lower Hudson Pond	88	36	1,657	2,044,000	T10 R10 WELS
Allagash Pond	88	36	876	1,081,000	T9 R15 WELS
Abol Pond	88	36	406	501,000	T2 R9 WELS
Fifth Debsconeag Lake	87	35	988	1,219,000	Rainbow Twp, T1 R11 WELS
Upper Elbow Pond	86	35	699	862,000	T10 R10 WELS, T10 R11 WELS
Marr Pond	85	34	198	244,000	Sangerville
Round Pond	84	34	876	1,081,000	Lobster Twp, T3 R13 WELS
Big Duck Pond	83	34	543	670,000	East Middlesex Canal Grant Twp
Ripogenus Pond	81	33	754	930,000	T4 R12 WELS
Bear Pond	81	33	481	593,000	T2 R13 WELS
Saddle Pond	78	32	455	561,000	T7 R9 WELS
Duck Pond	78	32	754	930,000	Bowerbank
Midnight Pond	77	31	138	170,000	T6 R12 WELS
Little Greenwood Pond	76	31	1,190	1,470,000	Elliottsville Twp
Lower Ellis Pond	74	30			T7 R14 WELS
Bartlett Pond	74	30			T10 R9 WELS
Shack Pond	73	30	681	840,000	Lobster Twp
Sawyer Pond	72	29	478	590,000	Greenville
2nd So. Br. Russell Pd	72	29	650	800,000	T8 R14 WELS
Mountain Pond	71	29	348	429,000	T10 R10 WELS
Berry Pond	71	29	705	870,000	T2 R13 WELS
Second Davis Pond	70	28	759	936,000	Guilford, Willimantic
Salmon Stream Pond	70	28	730	900,000	Guilford
Little Pleasant Pond	70	28			T10 R11 WELS
East Shirley Bog	70	28			Shirley, Little Moose Twp
Upper Soper Pond	68	28			T8 R11 WELS
McPherson Pond	68	28	574	708,000	T10 R10 WELS
Indian Pond	68	28	288	355,000	Bowdoin College Grant West Twp
Slaughter Pond	66	27	855	1,055,000	T3 R11 WELS
Billfish Pond	65	26	1,606	1,981,000	T6 R7 WELS, Trout Brook Twp
Shirley Pond	64	26			Shirley
Big Fisher Pond	64	26	584	720,000	T2 R12 WELS
Mile Pond	63	25	657	810,000	T8 R14 WELS
Horseshoe Pond	63	25	632	780,000	Willimantic
Rainbow Deadwaters	62	25	473	583,000	Rainbow Twp
Fourth Lake	62	25	334	412,000	T7 R11 WELS
Spectacle Pond	61	25	126	155,000	Blanchard Twp
Cow Pond	61	25	608	750,000	T1 R13 WELS, T2 R13 WELS
Turtle Pond	60	24	745	919,000	Lake View Plt
Little Round Pond	60	24			Eagle Lake Twp
Little Hurd Pond	60	24	1,478	1,823,000	T2 R10 WELS
Kelly Pond	60	24	711	877,000	T2 R12 WELS
North Pond	59	24	559	690,000	Elliottsville Twp
Lower Fowler Pond	59	24	440	540,000	Trout Brook Twp
Little Spencer Pond	59	24	739	912,000	East Middlesex Canal Grant Twp
Cedar Pond	59	24	981	1,210,000	TB R10 WELS
Johnston Pond	58	23	1,105	1,363,000	TA R10 WELS
Second Buttermilk Pond	57	23			Bowerbank
Mountain Pond	57	23	251	310,000	Beaver Cove, Bowdoin College Grant East Twp
Grassy Pond	56	23	535	660,000	T2 R12 WELS
Big Bennett Pond	56	23	906	1,118,000	Guilford
McKenna Pond	55	22	511	630,000	T3 R11 WELS
Big Caribou Pond	55	22	559	690,000	T7 R10 WELS
Bean Pot Pond	54	22	511	630,000	T5 R15 WELS
Tarbox Pond	53	21	535	660,000	T6 R14 WELS
Pretty Pond	53	21	131	162,000	T8 R11 WELS
West Chairback Pond	52	21	336	414,000	T7 R9 NWP
Roaring Brook Pond	52	21	535	660,000	T7 R9 NWP
Snowshoe Pond	51	21	389	480,000	T8 R11 WELS
Long Pond	51	21	780	960,000	Trout Brook Twp
Leavitt Pond	51	21	449	554,000	T1 R11 WELS
Woodman Pond	50	20			T7 R11 WELS, T7 R12 WELS
Pockwockamus Pond	50	20	462	570,000	T2 R9 WELS
Grass Pond	50	20	492	607,000	T9 R12 WELS
East Chairback Pond	50	20	709	875,000	T7 R9 NWP
Doe Pond	50	20	175	216,000	Monson
Cranberry Pond	50	20	462	570,000	Lobster Twp
Middle Elbow Pond	49	20			T10 R10 WELS
Horserace Ponds	49	20	486	599,000	Rainbow Twp T3 R11 WELS
Alligator Pond	49	20	607	749,000	TA R11 WELS
Sixth Roach Pond	48	19	67	83,000	Shawtown Twp
Sing Sing (Harding) Pond	48	19	273	337,000	T1 R11 WELS
Blood Pond	48	19			T2 R13 WELS
Little Holbrook Pond	47	19	462	570,000	T3 R11 WELS
Church Pond	47	19			TA R10 WELS
Foss and Knowlton Pond	46	19	410	510,000	T3 R10 WELS
East Branch Pond	46	19	438	540,000	T7 R11 WELS
Lost Pond	45	18	462	570,000	T7 R12 WELS T7 R13 WELS
Mud Pond	44	18	438	540,000	Bowerbank
Middle Fowler Pond	44	18	621	766,000	T5 R9 WELS
Dunham Pond	44	18	178	220,000	Guilford
Little Mud Pond	43	17	413	509,000	T4 R12 WELS
Lucia Pond	42	17	462	570,000	T7 R9 NWP
Kidney Pond	42	17	438	540,000	East Middlesex Canal Grant Twp
Big Beaver Pond	42	17	610	750,000	Rainbow Twp
Bear Pond	42	17	709	875,000	Bowerbank
Punchbowl Pond	41	17	254	313,000	Blanchard Twp
Little Pillsbury Pond	41	17	178	220,000	T8 R11 WELS
Little Frost Pond	41	17	879	1,084,000	T3 R12 WELS
Poverty Pond	40	16	389	480,000	Willimantic
McGooseley Pond	40	16	365	450,000	T4 R15 WELS
Jo-Mary Pond	40	16	139	171,000	TB R10 WELS
Frost Pond	40	16	215	265,000	Trout Brook Twp
First Musquash Pond	40	16			T1 R11 WELS
Bluffer Pond	40	16	147	181,000	T8 R11 WELS
Middle Branch Pond	39	16			T5 R9 NWP
Lower Bean Pond	39	16	404	498,000	Rainbow Twp
Little Harrow Lake	39	16	394	486,000	T10 R11 WELS
Leonard Pond	39	16	39	48,000	T10 R9 WELS
Harrington Pond	39	16	389	480,000	T3 R11 WELS
Jaquith Pond	38	15	328	405,000	Brownville
Juniper Knee Pond	36	15	160	200,000	Elliottsville Twp
Mill Brook Pond	36	15	341	421,000	Bowerbank
Hedgehog Pond	36	15	48	59,000	Bowdoin College Grant West Twp
Clarkson Pond	36	15	374	461,000	T9 R13 WELS, T9 R14 WELS
Bennett Pond	36	15	475	586,000	Parkman
Second Musquash Pond	35	14	535	660,000	T1 R11 WELS
Daicey Pond	35	14	331	408,000	T3 R10 WELS
Bog Pond	35	14	389	480,000	TA R11 WELS
Upper Moose Pond	34	14	341	421,000	T7 R10 WELS
Upper Island Pond	34	14	61	75,000	T10 R10 WELS
Trout Pond	34	14	190	230,000	Little Moose Twp
Ira Bog	34	14	268	331,000	Little Moose Twp
Bog Pond	34	14	344	424,000	T7 R12 WELS
Stink Pond / Snake Bog	33	13			T7 R11 WELS
Sampson Pond	32	13	292	360,000	T7 R9 NWP
Lower Portage Pond	32	13	344	424,000	T9 R11 WELS
Little Fisher Pond	32	13	341	421,000	T2 R12 WELS
Bear Pond	32	13	943	1,163,000	Rainbow Twp
Atkins Pond	32	13	316	390,000	T8 R9 WELS
1st So. Br. Russell Pd	32	13	394	486,000	T8 R14 WELS
Second Currier Pond	31	13	99	122,000	T9 R11 WELS
Mud Greenwood Pond	31	13	224	276,000	Willimantic
Little Penobscot Pond	31	13	365	450,000	T1 R11 WELS
"Upper" Twin Pond	31	13	1,029	1,269,000	T2 R9 WELS
Sixth Debsconeag Lake	30	12	316	390,000	Rainbow Twp, T1 R11 WELS
Partridge Pond	30	12	296	365,000	T8 R11 WELS
Otter Pond	30	12	394	486,000	Nesourdnahunk Twp, T9 R12 WELS
Black Brook Deadwater	30	12			T2 R12 WELS
Upper Deadwater Pond	29	12	344	424,000	T10 R11 WELS
Pingree Pond	29	12	243	300,000	Parkman
Mountain Pond	29	12	292	360,000	T8 R14 WELS, T8 R15 WELS
Lazy Tom Stream Pond	29	12			T1 R13 WELS
"Lower" Twin Pond	29	12	388	479,000	T2 R9 WELS
Ten-Forty Pond	28	11	243	300,000	T2 R12 WELS
Seventh Roach Pond	28	11	130	160,000	TA R11 WELS
Little Scott Deadwater	28	11			T6 R14 WELS
Grindstone Pond	28	11	310	380,000	Willimantic
Rocky Pond	27	11	137	169,000	T3 R10 WELS
Lower Elbow Pond	27	11	365	450,000	T10 R10 WELS
Greenleaf Pond	27	11			Abbot
Garland Pond	27	11	384	474,000	Dover-Foxcroft, Sebec
Fogg Pond	27	11	191	236,000	Bowdoin College Grant West Twp
Beaver Pond	27	11	100	120,000	Shawtown Twp
Little Wilson Pond	26	11	292	360,000	Elliottsville Twp
Upper Bean Pond	26	11	243	300,000	Rainbow Twp
Squankin Pond	26	11	268	331,000	Monson
Snow's Pond	26	11	246	303,000	Dover-Foxcroft
Round Pond	26	11			T7 R8 WELS, T7 R9 WELS
Lost Pond	26	11	292	360,000	T3 R10 WELS
Little Moose Pond	26	11	519	640,000	Little Moose Twp
Little Kelly Pond	26	11	195	241,000	T2 R12 WELS
Lewis Pond	26	11	295	364,000	Soper Mountain Twp
Grassy Pond	26	11			T3 R10 WELS
Tea Pond	25	10	292	360,000	T2 R9 WELS
May Pond	25	10	292	360,000	T7 R11 WELS
Logan Pond #1	25	10	292	360,000	T2 R9 WELS
Little Reed Pond	25	10	100	120,000	T8 R10 WELS
Elbow Pond	25	10			T3 R10 WELS
Duck Pond	25	10			T4 R11 WELS
Six Ponds #4	24	9.7	113	139,000	T4 R9 WELS
Norton Pond	24	9.7	124	153,000	Brownville
Middle Russell Pond	24	9.7			T9 R14 WELS
Jackson Pond #1	24	9.7	312	385,000	T3 R10 WELS, T3 R11 WELS
Fourth Davis Pond	24	9.7	219	270,000	Willimantic
Russell Pond	23	9.3	62	76,000	T4 R9 WELS
Mule Brook Deadwater	23	9.3			T10 R10 WELS
Mountain Brook Pond	23	9.3	75	93,000	Bowdoin College Grant West Twp
Kyle Pond	23	9.3	243	300,000	T7 R12 WELS
Gilbert Pond	23	9.3	243	300,000	Parkman
Dow Pond	23	9.3	130	160,000	Sebec
Sucker Brook Lake	22	8.9	219	270,000	Katahdin Iron Works Twp
Scutaze Strm Deadwater	22	8.9			Lake View Plt
Rum Pond	22	8.9	195	241,000	T2 R9 WELS
Pogy Pond	22	8.9	233	287,000	T4 R9 WELS
Little Scott Pond	22	8.9	462	570,000	T5 R14 WELS, T6 R14 WELS
Little Churchill Pond	22	8.9	54	67,000	T10 R13 WELS
Harriman Pond	22	8.9	243	300,000	Sebec
First Currier Pond	22	8.9	64	79,000	T9 R11 WELS
Tumbledown Dick Pond	21	8.5			T1 R11 WELS
Otter Pond	21	8.5	127	157,000	T3 R13 WELS
Monkey Pond	21	8.5	109	134,000	TA R11 WELS
Little Pine Pond	21	8.5	243	300,000	T3 R13 WELS
Little Moose Pond	21	8.5	243	300,000	T7 R10 WELS
Little Houston Pond	21	8.5	146	180,000	Katahdin Iron Works Twp
Clifford Pond	21	8.5	275	339,000	Rainbow Twp
Buckley Pond	21	8.5	59	73,000	T8 R10 WELS
Bait Pond	21	8.5	212	261,000	T4 Indian Purchase Twp, T1 R9 WELS
Weed Pond	20	8.1	181	223,000	T4 R9 WELS
Trout Pond	20	8.1	111	137,000	Bowdoin College Grant West Twp
Towne Pond	20	8.1	195	241,000	Monson
Tom Young Pond	20	8.1	38	47,000	East Middlesex Canal Grant Twp
Soper Brook Deadwater	20	8.1			T4 R11 WELS
Oakes Bog	20	8.1			Shirley
Mitchell Pond	20	8.1	186	229,000	T7 R9 WELS
Logan Pond #2	20	8.1	195	241,000	T2 R9 WELS
Lily Pond	20	8.1	195	241,000	Monson Shirley
Lily Pad Pond	20	8.1	143	176,000	T3 R10 WELS
Blunder Pond	20	8.1	195	241,000	T6 R10 WELS
Avery Pond	20	8.1	584	720,000	T7 R15 WELS
Abbee Pond	20	8.1	73	90,000	Brownville
1st Little Lyford Pond	20	8.1	82	101,000	Bowdoin College Grant East Twp
Little Longley Pond	19	7.7	195	241,000	T6 R13 WELS
Lily Bog	19	7.7	195	241,000	Wellington
Fowler Pond	19	7.7	65	80,000	T3 R11 WELS
2nd Little Lyford Pond	19	7.7	86	106,000	Bowdoin College Grant East Twp, Bowdoin College Grant West Twp
Thanksgiving Pond	18	7.3	99	122,000	Blanchard Twp
Mink Marsh Pond	18	7.3	25	31,000	T11 R10 WELS, T10 R10 WELS
South Pond	18	7.3	195	241,000	Monson
Parker Pond	18	7.3	195	241,000	Sebec
Greenwood Pond	18	7.3	263	324,000	Bowdoin College Grant East Twp, TB R11 WELS
Brown Pond	18	7.3	63	78,000	Bowdoin College Grant West Twp
Bell Pond	18	7.3	149	184,000	Monson
Bear Pond	17	6.9	168	207,000	Elliottsville Twp
Twin Pond #1	17	6.9	168	207,000	T4 R9 WELS
Sing Sing Pond	17	6.9	170	210,000	T1 R11 WELS
Lower Doughty Pond	17	6.9	195	241,000	Monson
Lazy Tom Pond	17	6.9	170	210,000	T1 R13 WELS
East Branch Deadwater	17	6.9			T7 R10 WELS
Marble Pond	16	6.5	19	23,000	Blanchard Twp
Cloud Pond	16	6.5	195	241,000	Elliottsville Twp
Upper Bluffer Pond	16	6.5	40	49,000	T8 R11 WELS
Third Musquash Pond	16	6.5	243	300,000	T1 R11 WELS, T1 R12 WELS
Spring Pond	16	6.5	129	159,000	T7 R10 WELS
Shadow Pond	16	6.5			Greenville Cove Point Twp, Little Moose Twp
Sewall Deadwater Pond	16	6.5			T9 R10 WELS
Mud Pond	16	6.5	195	241,000	T2 R10 WELS
Mountain View Pond	16	6.5	77	95,000	TA R11 WELS
Matthews Pond	16	6.5	141	174,000	T8 R10 WELS
Little Rocky Pond	16	6.5	105	130,000	T3 R10 WELS
Little Pleasant Pond	16	6.5			TA R11 WELS
Hay Pond	16	6.5	117	144,000	T7 R11 WELS
Boot Pond	16	6.5	170	210,000	T7 R9 NWP
Prescott Pond	15	6.1	146	180,000	Elliottsville Twp
Moose Pond	15	6.1	146	180,000	Elliottsville Twp
Third Davis Pond	15	6.1	122	150,000	Willimantic
South Pond	15	6.1			T7 R9 NWP
Smith Brook Pond	15	6.1	15	19,000	T9 R10 WELS
Prentiss Pond	15	6.1	47	58,000	T1 R11 WELS
Little Mud Pond	15	6.1	36	44,000	Greenville
Doughnut Pond	15	6.1	158	195,000	Rainbow Twp
Upper Doughty Pond	14	5.7	146	180,000	Monson
Sandy Stream Pond	14	5.7	32	39,000	Mount Katahdin Twp
Rocky Pond	14	5.7	146	180,000	T3 R11 WELS
Polly Pond	14	5.7	146	180,000	T3 R11 WELS
Pitman Pond	14	5.7	111	137,000	T2 R10 WELS
Pine Pond	14	5.7	146	180,000	T7 R15 WELS
Peaked Mountain Pond	14	5.7	49	60,000	T10 R10 WELS, T10 R11 WELS
McLellan Pond	14	5.7	146	180,000	Shirley, Elliotsville Twp
Little Wadleigh Pond	14	5.7	146	180,000	T8 R15 WELS
Gauntlet Pond	14	5.7	45	56,000	TB R10 WELS
Draper Pond	14	5.7	69	85,000	T3 R10 WELS
Crater Pond	14	5.7	146	180,000	TB R11 WELS
Big Minister Pond	14	5.7	78	96,000	T2 R10 WELS
Big Boardway (Boardman) Pond	14	5.7	77	95,000	TA R11 WELS
Beaver Pond	14	5.7	146	180,000	T3 R11 WELS
Bean Pond	14	5.7	146	180,000	T2 R12 WELS
Secret Pond	13	5.3	122	150,000	Elliottsville Twp
Hussey Pond	13	5.3	146	180,000	Blanchard Twp
Mud Pond #1	13	5.3	146	180,000	Parkman
Little Rocky Pond	13	5.3	22	27,000	TA R11 WELS
Line Pond	13	5.3	195	241,000	T7 R11 WELS, T8 R11 WELS
Eighteen Pond	13	5.3	146	180,000	Monson
Dwelley Pond	13	5.3			Nesourdnahunk Twp
Big Grapevine Pond	13	5.3	146	180,000	Bowerbank
Midday Pond	12	4.9	122	150,000	Elliottsville Twp
Upper Partridge Pond	12	4.9	118	146,000	T8 R11 WELS
Secret Pond	12	4.9	134	165,000	Greenville
Salmon Pond	12	4.9	122	150,000	Greenville
Moores Pond	12	4.9	122	150,000	Monson
Lost Pond	12	4.9	170	210,000	T6 R10 WELS
Long Bog	12	4.9	37	46,000	Shawtown Twp
Little Hudson Pond	12	4.9	122	150,000	T10 R10 WELS
Little Female Pond	12	4.9	146	180,000	T1 R12 WELS
Little Berry Pond	12	4.9	146	180,000	T2 R13 WELS
Lily Pond	12	4.9	122	150,000	Monson
Jewett Pond	12	4.9	22	27,000	Spencer Bay Twp
Hilton Pond #1	12	4.9	122	150,000	Kingsbury Plt
Gould Pond	12	4.9	122	150,000	Rainbow Twp
Dudley Rips Pond	12	4.9			T4 R9 NWP
Center Pond	12	4.9	195	241,000	T4 R10 WELS
Birch Ridge Pond #1	12	4.9	155	191,000	TA R11 WELS
Big Notch Pond	12	4.9	114	141,000	Little Moose Twp
Basin Pond (Upper)	12	4.9	40	49,000	Mount Katahdin Twp
Smith Pond	11	4.5	99	122,000	Elliottsville Twp
Hedgehog Pond	11	4.5	11	14,000	Blanchard Twp
Tracy Pond	11	4.5			T3 R10 WELS
Stratton Pond	11	4.5	146	180,000	Rainbow Twp
Ragged Pond	11	4.5	44	54,000	T9 R10 WELS
Pleasant Stream Ddwtr	11	4.5			T9 R12 WELS
Mud Pond	11	4.5	146	180,000	Medford
McDougal Pond	11	4.5	97	120,000	T6 R15 WELS
Lower Partridge Pond	11	4.5	114	141,000	T8 R11 WELS
Little Johnson Pond	11	4.5	97	120,000	T8 R14 WELS
Little Duck Pond	11	4.5	109	134,000	East Middlesex Canal Grant Twp
Little Caribou Pond	11	4.5			T7 R10 WELS
Little Bluffer Pond	11	4.5	41	51,000	T8 R11 WELS
Little Bennett Pond	11	4.5			Willimantic
High Pond	11	4.5	93	115,000	Trout Brook Twp
Daisey Pond	11	4.5	54	67,000	T2 R10 WELS
Carry Pond	11	4.5	54	67,000	T3 R11 WELS
Badger Pond	11	4.5	146	180,000	Willimantic
Abol Deadwater	11	4.5			T2 R10 WELS

== Sagadahoc County ==
Name	Area		Volume		Adjoining towns
Name	acres	ha	acre-feet	m^{3}	Adjoining towns
Upper Pleasant (Mud) Pond	797	323	7,293	8,996,000	Gardiner, Litchfield, West Gardiner, Richmond
Nequassett Lake	465	188	10,757	13,269,000	Woolwich
Mill Pond	117	47			
Center Pond	84	34	195	241,000	Phippsburg
Spirit Pond	61	25	569	702,000	Phippsburg
Caesar Pond	51	21	210	260,000	Bowdoin
Umberhind Marsh	50	20			Richmond
Winnegance Pond	48	19			Arrowsic, Phippsburg, West Bath
Sewall Pond	46	19	319	393,000	Arrowsic
Bradley Pond	30	12			Topsham
Wat-Tuh Lake	24	9.7	134	165,000	Phippsburg
Meacham Pond	16	6.5			Bowdoin
Stoddard Pond	14	5.7	131	162,000	Bowdoinham
Houghton Pond	14	5.7	64	79,000	Bath
Charles Pond	14	5.7	139	171,000	Georgetown
Big (Cape Small) Pond	13	5.3	117	144,000	Phippsburg
Silver Lake	12	4.9	50	62,000	Phippsburg

== Somerset County ==
Name	Area		Volume		Adjoining towns
Name	acres	ha	acre-feet	m^{3}	Adjoining towns
Flagstaff Lake	17,380	7,030	261,365	322,389,000	Eustis, Bigelow Twp, Carrying Place Town Twp,
Brassua Lake	9,454	3,826	275,166	339,412,000	Taunton & Raynham Academy Grant, Brassua Twp
Seboomook Lake	6,880	2,780	102,195	126,056,000	Pittston Academy Grant, Plymouth Twp Seboomook Twp
Great Moose Lake	3,856	1,560	52,697	65,001,000	Harmony, Hartland
Indian Pond	3,455	1,398	64,093	79,058,000	Big Squaw Twp, Chase Stream Twp, Indian Stream Twp
Long Pond	2,951	1,194	17,585	21,691,000	Jackman, Long Pond Twp
Attean Pond	2,880	1,170	37,037	45,684,000	Attean Twp
Canada Falls Lake	2,305	933	17,841	22,007,000	Alder Brook Twp, Pittston Academy Grant
Moxie Pond (Lake Moxie)	2,229	902	28,537	35,200,000	The Forks Plt, Bald Mountain Twp, T2 R3, East Moxie
Wood Pond	2,168	877	54,810	67,610,000	Dennistown Plt, Attean Twp
Wyman Lake	1,819	736	194,016	239,315,000	Moscow, Pleasant Ridge Plt, Carrying Place Twp
Spencer Lake	1,671	676	52,555	64,826,000	Hobbstown Twp, T3 R5 BKP WKR
Embden Pond	1,542	624	91,627	113,020,000	Embden
Pierce Pond	1,526	618	7,312	9,019,000	Bowtown Twp, Pierce Pond Twp
Wesserunsett Lake	1,404	568	18,556	22,888,000	Madison
Baker Lake	1,255	508	13,929	17,181,000	T7 R17 WELS
Penobscot Lake	1,161	470	25,090	30,950,000	Dole Brook Twp, Hammond Twp, Prentiss Twp
Bald Mountain Pond	1,146	464	22,352	27,571,000	Bald Mountain Twp, T2 R3
Big Indian Pond	1,144	463	9,922	12,239,000	Saint Albans
Holeb Pond	1,098	444	11,486	14,168,000	Attean Twp, Holeb Twp
Pleasant Pond	1,037	420	77,993	96,203,000	Caratunk, The Forks Plt
Spring Lake	729	295	19,336	23,851,000	T3 R4 BKP WKR
West Carry Pond	726	294	25,754	31,767,000	Carrying Place Town Twp
Little Big Wood Pond	716	290	18,389	22,682,000	Dennistown Plt, Attean Twp
Fifth Saint John Pond	680	280	9,622	11,869,000	T5 R17 WELS, T6 R17 WELS
Long (Lewiston) Pond	675	273	245	302,000	Dole Brook Twp
Austin Pond	657	266	5,622	6,935,000	Bald Mountain Twp, T2 R3
Parlin Pond	586	237	8,092	9,981,000	Johnson Mountain Twp, Parlin Pond Twp
King and Bartlett Lake	537	217	31,730	39,140,000	King & Bartlett Twp
Douglas Pond	445	180			Palmyra, Pittsfield
Kingsbury Pond	432	175	7,571	9,339,000	Kingsbury Plt, Mayfield Twp
Gilman Pond	408	165	2,381	2,937,000	New Portland, Lexington Twp
Sibley Pond	396	160	4,741	5,848,000	Canaan, Pittsfield
Saint Francis Lake	350	140	3,686	4,547,000	T8 R16 WELS
Black Brook Pond	346	140	1,885	2,325,000	Moxie Gore
Enchanted Pond	334	135	25,391	31,319,000	Upper Enchanted Twp
Lake George	318	129	7,653	9,440,000	Canaan, Skowhegan
Hancock Pond	314	127	5,797	7,150,000	Embden, Lexington Twp
Dole Pond	308	125	7,886	9,727,000	Dole Brook Twp
East Carry Pond	291	118	2,927	3,610,000	Carrying Place Town Twp
Solon Flowage	285	115			Solon
Crocker Pond	250	100	3,594	4,433,000	Dennistown Plt
Ripley Pond	248	100	967	1,193,000	Ripley
Elm Pond	248	100	2,456	3,029,000	Elm Stream Twp
Baker Pond	248	100	2,618	3,229,000	T5 R6 BKP WKR
Wentworth (Ironbound) Pond	224	91	4,173	5,147,000	Athens, Solon
Fish Pond	222	90	3,946	4,867,000	Thorndike Twp
Third Saint John Pond	221	89	2,025	2,498,000	T4 R17 WELS, T5 R17 WELS
Wyman Pond	220	89	1,613	1,990,000	Brighton Plt
Fish Pond	219	89	2,700	3,300,000	Hobbstown Twp
Cold Stream Pond	207	84	2,807	3,462,000	Johnson Mountain Twp, Misery Twp, Parlin Pond Twp
Rowe Pond	205	83	2,861	3,529,000	Pleasant Ridge Plt
Tomhegan Pond	204	83	1,980	2,440,000	Soldiertown Twp, West Middlesex Canal Grant
Baker Pond	199	81	5,908	7,287,000	Caratunk
Fourth Saint John Pond	194	79	2,095	2,584,000	T5 R17 WELS
Fahi Pond	194	79	1,127	1,390,000	Embden
Mayfield Pond	188	76	1,386	1,710,000	Brighton Plt, Mayfield Twp
Heald Pond	187	76	3,609	4,452,000	Moose River
Whipple Pond	185	75	354	437,000	T5 R7 BKP WKR
Demo Pond	169	68	1,125	1,388,000	Rockwood Strip, T2 R1 NBKP
Grace Pond	168	68	1,002	1,236,000	Upper Enchanted Twp
Whites Pond	166	67	758	935,000	Palmyra
Smith (Weeks) Pond	166	67	1,977	2,439,000	Brighton Plt
Frost Pond	160	65	1,678	2,070,000	T4 R5 NBKP
Foley Pond	150	61	1,973	2,434,000	Comstock Twp
Long Pond	149	60			Taunton & Raynham Academy Grant
Duncan Pond	148	60	2,084	2,571,000	Prentiss Twp
Rock Pond	146	59	1,110	1,370,000	T5 R6 BKP WKR
Morrill Pond	145	59	2,015	2,485,000	Hartland
Little Indian Pond	142	57	652	804,000	Saint Albans
Luther Pond	136	55	634	782,000	Thorndike Twp
Stafford Pond	134	54	837	1,032,000	Hartland
Jones Pond	134	54	1,156	1,426,000	Bald Mountain Twp, T4 R3
Little Bog	128	52	1,265	1,560,000	T6 R17 WELS
Little Austin Pond	128	52	2,029	2,503,000	Bald Mountain Twp T2 R3
Middle Carry Pond	127	51	1,099	1,356,000	Carrying Place Town Twp
Big Turner Pond	127	51	1,100	1,400,000	Forsyth Twp
Knights Pond	125	51	1,645	2,029,000	Moxie Gore, Squaretown Twp
Mercer Bog (Bog Stream Pond)	123	50			Mercer
Turner Pond	119	48	1,206	1,488,000	T7 R16 WELS
Benjamin Pond	119	48	1,192	1,470,000	Attean Twp
Muskrat Pond	115	47	985	1,215,000	Thorndike Twp
Russell Pond	113	46	1,332	1,643,000	Russell Pond Twp
Second Saint John Pond	112	45	249	307,000	T4 R17 WELS
Sandy Pond	110	45	1,751	2,160,000	Embden
Barker Pond	110	45	1,093	1,348,000	Cornville
Alder Pond	110	45	1,063	1,311,000	Lower Enchanted Twp, T3 R5 BKP WKR
Chase Pond	109	44	560	690,000	Moscow
Starbird Pond	108	44	1,183	1,459,000	Hartland
St Albans Game Mgmt Pd	102	41	1,005	1,240,000	Saint Albans
Kilgore Pond	102	41	1,105	1,363,000	Bowtown Twp, Pierce Pond Twp
Ellis Pond	101	41	1,453	1,792,000	Chase Stream Twp
Mosquito Pond	100	40	1,722	2,124,000	The Forks Plt
Cheney Pond	98	40	936	1,155,000	Hammond Twp, Prentiss Twp
Big Grenier Pond	97	39	1,070	1,320,000	T4 R5 NBKP
Supply Pond	93	38	616	760,000	Jackman Moose River
Mainstream Pond	92	37			Cambridge, Harmony, Ripley
Bog Pond	92	37			Attean Twp T5 R7 BKP WKR
Little King Lake	91	37	2,907	3,586,000	T4 R5 NBKP
Oaks Pond	88	36	2,176	2,684,000	Skowhegan
Mud Pond	85	34			Attean Twp
Basin Pond	84	34	964	1,189,000	Pierce Pond Twp
Big Dimmock Pond	83	34	1,413	1,743,000	Caratunk
Long Pond	82	33	230	280,000	Forsyth Twp, Holeb Twp
Otter Pond	80	32	773	953,000	Bowtown Twp
Baker Pond	80	32	914	1,127,000	Moxie Gore
Baker Pond	79	32	198	244,000	Tomhegan Twp
Parker Pond	73	30	203	250,000	T3 R5 BKP WKR
Little Saint John Lake	73	30			T5 R20 WELS
The Serpentine	71	29			Smithfield
Desolation Pond	71	29	250	310,000	T8 R16 WELS
Little Moxie Pond	70	28	320	390,000	East Moxie Twp
North Otter Pond	68	28	380	470,000	Bowtown Twp
Grass Pond	68	28	486	599,000	Pierce Pond Twp
Corner Pond	68	28	584	720,000	T10 R11 WELS, T8 R16 WELS, T9 R16 WELS
Dingley Pond	66	27	133	164,000	T4 R5 NBKP
Fletcher Pond #1	65	26	122	150,000	Brassua Twp
Dead Stream Pond	65	26	782	965,000	West Forks Plt, Chase Stream Twp
Horseshoe Pond	64	26	486	599,000	Attean Twp
Big Fish Pond	63	25	120	150,000	Holeb Twp
Spruce Pond	62	25	416	513,000	Lexington Twp
Black Brook Pond	58	23	540	670,000	Pierce Pond Twp
Baker Pond	58	23	1,399	1,726,000	Solon
Clayton Pond	57	23	738	910,000	T6 R17 WELS
Center Pond	56	23	435	537,000	Soldiertown Twp
Indian Pond	55	22	581	717,000	Lexington Twp
Fogg Pond	55	22	143	176,000	Long Pond Twp
Little Turner Pond	54	22	754	930,000	Forsyth Twp
Hall Pond	54	22	413	509,000	T5 R7 BKP WKR
Summit Pond	52	21	512	632,000	T4 R17 WELS
Lost Pond	52	21	443	546,000	Russell Pond Twp
Como Lake	52	21			Harmony
Lower Shaw Pond-South	51	21	182	224,000	T3 R4 BKP WKR
Heald Pond (Big)	50	20	128	158,000	Caratunk
Frost Pond Flowage	50	20	681	840,000	T4 R5 NBKP
Fletcher Pond #2	50	20	195	241,000	Brassua Twp
Blakeslee Lake	48	19	542	669,000	T5 R6 BKP WKR
Round Pond	45	18	437	539,000	Squaretown Twp
Truesdale Pond	44	18	462	570,000	Comstock Twp
Long Pond	44	18	384	474,000	King & Bartlett Twp
Hurricane Pond	44	18			T5 R20 WELS
Felker Pond	44	18	128	158,000	King & Bartlett Twp
Upper Wellman Pond	43	17	446	550,000	Prentiss Twp
Shaw Pond	43	17	245	302,000	T3 R4 BKP WKR
Mountain Dimmock Pond	43	17	765	944,000	Caratunk
Little Elm Pond	43	17	438	540,000	Elm Stream Twp
Clearwater Pond	43	17	642	792,000	Attean Twp
Cambridge Pond	43	17			Cambridge
Butler Pond	43	17	136	168,000	King & Bartlett Twp
Austin Pond	43	17	423	522,000	T5 R17 WELS
Safford Pond	42	17	438	540,000	Lexington Twp
Tobey Pond #1	41	17	341	421,000	T5 R7 BKP WKR
Sweeney Bog	40	16			T6 R17 WELS
Little Dimmick Pond	40	16	310	380,000	Caratunk
Baker Flowage	40	16			Mayfield Twp
Socatean Pond #1	39	16	413	509,000	Plymouth Twp
Robinson Pond	39	16	260	320,000	Caratunk
Little Enchanted Pond	39	16	697	860,000	Upper Enchanted Twp
Ironbound Pond	39	16	206	254,000	Alder Brook Twp
Spectacle Pond	38	15	517	638,000	King & Bartlett Twp
Misery Pond	38	15	467	576,000	Misery Twp
Loon Pond	38	15	175	216,000	Attean Twp
Palmer Pond	37	15	607	749,000	Mayfield Twp
Moore Pond	37	15	542	669,000	Bradstreet Twp
Lang Pond	37	15	332	410,000	Parlin Pond Twp
Hale Pond	37	15	389	480,000	Alder Brook Twp
Big Bartley Pond	37	15	97	120,000	Holeb Twp
Beck Pond	37	15	311	384,000	T3 R5 BKP WKR
Barrett Pond	37	15	80	99,000	Holeb Twp
Round Pond	36	15	379	467,000	Chase Stream Twp
Roderique Pond	36	15	275	339,000	Rockwood Strip, T2 R1 NBKP
Deer Pond	36	15	416	513,000	King & Bartlett Twp
Ten Thousand Acre Pond	35	14	149	184,000	Chase Stream Twp
Robinson Pond	35	14	260	320,000	T4 R17 WELS
Round Pond	34	14			Sapling Twp
Mud Pond	33	13	491	606,000	Thorndike Twp
Dority Pond	33	13	356	439,000	Hammond Twp, Prentiss Twp
Coburn Pond	33	13	292	360,000	Moose River
Big Berry Pond	33	13	331	408,000	Johnson Mountain Twp
Spaulding Pond	32	13	84	104,000	Dole Brook Twp
Long Pond	32	13	365	450,000	Attean Twp
Halfmoon Pond	32	13	242	299,000	Saint Albans
Alder Pond	32	13	147	181,000	Alder Brook Twp
Rancourt Pond	31	13	122	150,000	Dennistown Plt
Little Fish Pond	31	13	376	464,000	Alder Brook Twp
Jackson Pond	31	13	302	373,000	Concord Twp
Horseshoe Pond	31	13	350	430,000	Chase Stream Twp
Upper First Saint John Pond	30	12	105	130,000	Comstock Twp, T4 R17 WELS
Tobey Pond #2	30	12	316	390,000	T5 R7 BKP WKR
Chub Pond	30	12	287	354,000	Hobbstown Twp
Butler Pond	30	12	209	258,000	Kingfield, Lexington Twp
Iron Pond	28	11	109	134,000	Hobbstown Twp, T5 R6 BKP WKR
Frypan Pond	28	11	41	51,000	Squaretown Twp
Bean (Beans) Pond	28	11	261	322,000	Pleasant Ridge Plt
Lower First Saint John Pond	26	11	44	54,000	T4 R17 WELS
Horseshoe Pond	26	11	491	606,000	Misery Gore Twp, Parlin Pond Twp
Boulder Pond	26	11	292	360,000	T5 R7 BKP WKR
Bog Pond	26	11	260	320,000	Hartland
Island Pond	25	10	280	350,000	Chase Stream Twp
Clear (Mill) Pond	25	10	386	476,000	Pleasant Ridge Plt
Bobs Pond	25	10	268	331,000	T4 R17 WELS
Black Hill Pond	25	10	560	690,000	Embden
Lily (Merrill) Pond	24	9.7	241	297,000	Concord Twp
Lane Pond	24	9.7	243	300,000	Comstock Twp
Jewett Pond	24	9.7	107	132,000	Pleasant Ridge Plt
Horseshoe Pond	24	9.7	285	352,000	T3 R5 BKP WKR
Upper Dingley Pond (Grenier Pond)	23	9.3	68	84,000	T4 R5 NBKP
Sugar Berth Pond	23	9.3	141	174,000	Dennistown Plt
Rowell Pond	23	9.3	474	585,000	Solon
Long (Martin) Pond	23	9.3	165	204,000	The Forks Plt
Heald Pond (Little)	23	9.3	224	276,000	Caratunk
Gordon Pond	23	9.3	275	339,000	Upper Enchanted Twp
Chase Stream Pond	23	9.3	205	253,000	Chase Stream Twp, Misery Twp
Cape Horn Pond	23	9.3	219	270,000	Blake Gore, Prentiss Twp
Smith Pond	22	8.9			Cornville
Roberts Pond	22	8.9			T5 R20 WELS
Prescott Pond	22	8.9	292	360,000	Moxie Gore
McKenney Pond	22	8.9	404	498,000	Holeb Twp
Little Indian Pond	22	8.9	243	300,000	Squaretown Twp
Little Foley Pond	22	8.9	341	421,000	Comstock Twp
Little Chase Stream Pd	22	8.9	255	315,000	Misery Twp
King Pond	22	8.9	100	120,000	Bowtown Twp
Bill Morris Pond	22	8.9	181	223,000	T3 R5 BKP WKR
Wilson Hill Pond	21	8.5	177	218,000	West Forks Plt
Lost Pond	21	8.5	187	231,000	Pleasant Ridge Plt
Hicks Pond	21	8.5	243	300,000	Palmyra
Big Trickey Pond	21	8.5	210	260,000	Alder Brook Twp
Otter Pond	20	8.1	118	146,000	Carrying Place Town Twp
Long Bog	20	8.1	187	231,000	Attean Twp, Holeb Twp
Hall Pond	20	8.1	160	200,000	Prentiss Twp
Dubois Pond	20	8.1	170	210,000	Prentiss Twp
Clish Pond	20	8.1	100	120,000	T5 R20 WELS
Dixon Pond	19	7.7	449	554,000	Pierce Pond Twp
Withee Pond	18	7.3			Mayfield Twp
Otter Pond	18	7.3	67	83,000	Mayfield Twp
Little Palmer Pond	18	7.3	219	270,000	Mayfield Twp
Upper Misery Pond	17	6.9	164	202,000	Misery Twp
Smith Pond	17	6.9	39	48,000	Misery Twp, Parlin Pond Twp
Moores Bog	17	6.9			Caratunk
Helen Pond	17	6.9	146	180,000	Pierce Pond Twp
Chase Stream Pond	17	6.9			Chase Stream Twp
Call Pond	17	6.9	158	195,000	Lower Enchanted Twp
Mud Pond	16	6.5	170	210,000	Forsyth Twp, Holeb Twp
Long (Little Long) Pond	16	6.5	46	57,000	Chase Stream Twp
Little Lane Pond	16	6.5	170	210,000	Hammond Twp
Horseshoe Pond	16	6.5	243	300,000	East Moxie Twp
Chase Bog	16	6.5	170	210,000	Caratunk
Upper Tobey Pond	15	6.1	97	120,000	T5 R7 BKP WKR
Toby Pond	15	6.1	195	241,000	Hobbstown Twp
Tobey Pond #3	15	6.1	139	171,000	T5 R7 BKP WKR
Spencer Pond	15	6.1	122	150,000	Comstock Twp
Smith Pond	15	6.1	146	180,000	Forsyth Twp
Pennell Pond	15	6.1	156	192,000	New Portland
Moxie Bog	15	6.1			Bald Mountain Twp, T2 R3
Little Berry Pond	15	6.1	143	176,000	Johnson Mountain Twp
Leith Pond	15	6.1	178	220,000	Brassua Twp
Decker Pond #2	15	6.1	128	158,000	Caratunk
Cunningham Pond	15	6.1	122	150,000	Pittston Academy Grant
Upper Kilgore Pond	14	5.7	141	174,000	Bowtown Twp, Pierce Pond Twp
Socatean Pond #2	14	5.7	139	171,000	Plymouth Twp
Round Pond	14	5.7	146	180,000	Skowhegan
Redmond Pond	14	5.7	146	180,000	Lower Enchanted Twp
Rache Pond	14	5.7			Dennistown Plt
Otter Pond	14	5.7	122	150,000	Sandwich Academy Grant Twp
Mud Pond	14	5.7	177	218,000	Moxie Gore
Lard Pond	14	5.7	146	180,000	Elm Stream Twp
Kingsley Flowage	14	5.7			Mayfield Twp
Durgin Pond	14	5.7	38	47,000	Johnson Mountain Twp
Butler Pond	14	5.7	170	210,000	Flagstaff Twp
Scribner Bog	13	5.3			Squaretown Twp
Mule Pond	13	5.3	146	180,000	Russell Pond Twp
Mud Pond	13	5.3	124	153,000	Harmony
Lower Enchanted Pond	13	5.3			Lower Enchanted Twp
Little Wilson Hill Pd	13	5.3	197	243,000	Johnson Mountain Twp
Little Hale Pond	13	5.3	292	360,000	Alder Brook Twp
Little Gordon Pond	13	5.3	148	183,000	Lower Enchanted Twp
Heald Pond (Middle)	13	5.3	124	153,000	Caratunk
Fish Pond	13	5.3	114	141,000	Moxie Gore
Beaver Pond	13	5.3	97	120,000	Forsyth Twp
Sears Pond	12	4.9	122	150,000	Dole Brook Twp
Perry Pond	12	4.9	195	241,000	Harmony
Moose Pond	12	4.9	60	74,000	Bowtown Twp
Lower Welman Pond	12	4.9			Prentiss Twp
Log Landing Pond	12	4.9			Caratunk
Little Fish Pond	12	4.9	178	220,000	Holeb Twp
Little Dingley Pond	12	4.9	31	38,000	T4 R5 NBKP
Hutch Pond	12	4.9	97	120,000	Hammond Twp
Dipper Pond	12	4.9	129	159,000	Pittston Academy Grant, Soldiertown Twp
Davis Pond	12	4.9	148	183,000	T5 R6 BKP WKR
Clearwater Pond	12	4.9	97	120,000	Prentiss Twp
Chase Pond	12	4.9	45	56,000	Solon
Blair Pond	12	4.9			Jackman
Baker Stream Pond	12	4.9			Bald Mountain Twp, T2 R3
Reservoir	11	4.5			Waterville, Fairfield
Trout Pond	11	4.5	113	139,000	Brighton Plt
Tobey Pond	11	4.5	109	134,000	Johnson Mountain Twp
Pickerel Pond	11	4.5	85	105,000	Pierce Pond Twp
Lower Shaw Pond-North	11	4.5			T3 R4 BKP WKR
Lost Pond	11	4.5	148	183,000	T3 R5 BKP WKR
Lone Jack Pond	11	4.5	148	183,000	Johnson Mountain Twp
Little Lang Pond	11	4.5	61	75,000	Parlin Pond Twp
Lily Pond	11	4.5	105	130,000	Solon
Ladd Pond	11	4.5	109	134,000	Mercer
Joe Pokum Pond	11	4.5	100	120,000	King & Bartlett Twp
Horseshoe Pond	11	4.5	146	180,000	Pierce Pond Twp
Heald Pond	11	4.5	543	670,000	T3 R5 BKP WKR
Everett Pond	11	4.5	94	116,000	King & Bartlett Twp
Daymond Pond	11	4.5	61	75,000	Moose River
Beaver Pond	11	4.5	122	150,000	Alder Brook Twp

== Waldo County ==
Name	Area		Volume		Adjoining towns
Name	acres	ha	acre-feet	m^{3}	Adjoining towns
Lake Winnecook (Unity Pond)	2,523	1,021	46,989	57,960,000	Burnham, Troy, Unity
Swan Lake (Goose Pond)	1,364	552	41,241	50,870,000	Swanville, Searsport, Frankfort
Sheepscot Pond	1,215	492	53,216	65,641,000	Palermo
St. George Lake	1,017	412	22,478	27,726,000	Liberty
Quantabacook Lake	662	268	10,295	12,699,000	Morrill, Searsmont
Sandy (Freedom) Pond	420	170	1,451	1,790,000	Freedom
Pitcher Pond	370	150	4,668	5,758,000	Lincolnville, Northport
Tilden Pond	357	144	2,505	3,090,000	Belmont
Stevens Pond	339	137	4,005	4,940,000	Liberty
Carlton Pond	327	132	1,197	1,476,000	Detroit, Troy
Branch Pond	310	130	1,814	2,238,000	China, Palermo
Coleman Pond	225	91	2,540	3,130,000	Lincolnville
Stowers Meadow Pond	202	82			Stockton Springs
Trues Pond	173	70	657	810,000	Liberty, Montville
Toddy Pond	162	66	1,686	2,080,000	Brooks, Swanville
Halfmoon Pond	159	64	2,869	3,539,000	Prospect, Searsport
Cross Pond	159	64	836	1,031,000	Morrill
Norton Pond	123	50	2,547	3,142,000	Lincolnville
Lake Passagassawakeag	117	47	2,050	2,530,000	Brooks
Ellis Pond	100	40	357	440,000	Brooks
Knight Pond	95	38	648	799,000	Northport
Sanborn Pond	90	36	1,937	2,389,000	Brooks
Kingdom Bog	90	36	329	406,000	Montville
Lawry Pond	85	34	613	756,000	Searsmont
Smiths Mill Pond	81	33			Morrill
Little Pond	69	28	584	720,000	Liberty
Moody Pond	61	25	817	1,008,000	Lincolnville
Upper Mason Pond	60	24			Belfast
Beech Pond	59	24	373	460,000	Palermo
Cargill Pond	57	23	421	519,000	Liberty
Ruffingham Meadow	51	21			Searsmont
Belfast Reservoir #2	50	20	484	597,000	Belfast
Mixer Pond	48	19	719	887,000	Knox, Morrill
McClure Pond	46	19	462	570,000	Searsport
Little Pond	42	17	413	509,000	Searsmont
Chisholm Pond	42	17	461	569,000	Palermo
Meadow Pond	41	17			Isleboro
Dutton Pond	41	17	434	535,000	Knox
Hurds Pond	40	16	137	169,000	Swanville
Cain Pond	38	15	195	241,000	Searsport
Halfmoon (Sucker) Pond	37	15	365	450,000	Brooks
Belfast Reservoir #1	37	15	360	440,000	Belfast, Northport
Lower Mason Pond	35	14			Belfast
Bowler (Belton) Pond	35	14	467	576,000	Palermo
Levenseller Pond	34	14	202	249,000	Lincolnville, Searsmont
Foster (Crotch) Pond	32	13	564	696,000	Palermo
Jump Pond	31	13	502	619,000	Palermo
Basin Pond	28	11	189	233,000	Monroe
Lily Pond	27	11	97	120,000	Monroe
Colby Pond	26	11	153	189,000	Liberty
Ledge Pond	24	9.7	186	229,000	Montville
Belden Pond	24	9.7	243	300,000	Palermo
Thistle Pond	16	6.5	139	171,000	Monroe
Prescott Pond	15	6.1	187	231,000	Palermo
Northern Pond	15	6.1	122	150,000	Monroe
Mud Pond	15	6.1	146	180,000	Montville
Greers Bog	15	6.1	170	210,000	Morrill
Nichols Pond	14	5.7	135	167,000	Swanville
Mud Pond	13	5.3	122	150,000	Palermo
Drake Pond	13	5.3	146	180,000	Jackson
Unity Disposal Pd-West	12	4.9			Unity
Unity Disposal Pd-East	12	4.9			Unity
Thompson Brook Pond	12	4.9			Montville, Morrill
Smith Pond	12	4.9			Swanville
Saban Pond	11	4.5	224	276,000	Palermo
Dolliff Pond	11	4.5	82	101,000	Morrill

== Washington County ==
Name	Area		Volume		Adjoining towns
Name	acres	ha	acre-feet	m^{3}	Adjoining towns
Spednic Lake	17,219	6,968			Vanceboro, Forest Twp, Forest City Twp, T11 R3 NBP
Big Lake	10,444	4,227	123,238	152,012,000	Grand Lake Stream Plt, T27 ED BPP, Indian Twp Res
Baskahegan Lake	6,815	2,758	72,899	89,920,000	Topsfield, Brookton Twp, T8 R3 NBPP
Meddybemps Lake	6,719	2,719	95,295	117,545,000	Alexander, Baileyville, Baring, Meddybemps
Grand Falls (Berry Brook) Flowage	6,099	2,468	52,778	65,101,000	Baileyville, Princeton, Fowler Twp, Indian Twp Res
Gardner Lake	3,720	1,510	84,249	103,920,000	East Machias, Whiting, Marion Twp
Cathance Lake	3,227	1,306	74,050	91,340,000	Cooper, No 14 Twp
Third Machias Lake	2,558	1,035	36,833	45,433,000	T5 ND BPP, T42 MD BPP, T43 MD BPP
Pocomoonshine Lake	2,538	1,027	28,063	34,615,000	Alexander, Princeton
Pocumcus (Compass) Lake	2,211	895	40,872	50,415,000	T5 ND BPP, T6 ND BPP
Fourth Machias Lake (Upper Sabao)	1,913	774	16,661	20,551,000	T41 MD, T5 ND, BPP T42 MD BPP
Crawford Lake	1,879	760	18,557	22,890,000	Crawford, No 21 Twp
Second Lake	1,803	730	11,415	14,080,000	Marion Twp
Hadley Lake	1,771	717	19,228	23,717,000	East Machias
Boyden Lake	1,759	712	14,721	18,158,000	Perry, Robbinston
Rocky Lake	1,745	706	18,257	22,520,000	T18 ED BPP
West Musquash Lake	1,606	650	53,665	66,195,000	Talmadge, T6 R1 NBPP
Mopang Lake	1,556	630	32,996	40,700,000	Devereaux Twp
Pleasant Lake	1,550	630	45,357	55,947,000	Kossuth Twp, T6 R1 NBPP
Crooked Brook Flowage	1,254	507	7,003	8,638,000	Danforth
Clifford Lake	1,247	505	15,121	18,651,000	T26 ED BPP, T27 ED BPP
Pennamaquan (Pemaquan) Lake	1,193	483	13,855	17,090,000	Charlotte, Pembroke
Rocky (& Sunken) Lake	1,101	446	11,153	13,757,000	Whiting, Edmunds Twp, Marion Twp
Fifth Machias Lake	1,058	428	11,103	13,695,000	T36 MD BPP
Wabassus Lake	989	400	9,529	11,754,000	T6 ND BPP, T43 MD BPP, T43 MD BPP
Pleasant River Lake	908	367	12,972	16,001,000	Beddington, Devereaux Twp
Upper Hot Brook Lake	890	360	8,213	10,131,000	Danforth, T8 R4 NBPP
Nashs Lake	856	346	16,658	20,547,000	Calais
Bog Lake	828	335	11,790	14,540,000	Northfield
East Musquash Lake	818	331	16,763	20,677,000	Topsfield
Second Chain Lake	799	323	9,126	11,257,000	T26 ED BPP, T31 MD BPP, T37 MD BPP
Lower Hot Brook Lake	684	277	5,255	6,482,000	Bancroft, Danforth, T8 R4 NBPP
Long Lake	672	272	6,800	8,400,000	Northfield, Wesley, T18 ED BPP, T19 ED BPP
Love Lake	651	263	10,658	13,146,000	Crawford, T19 ED BPP
Bog Brook Flowage	625	253			Deblois
Long Lake	608	246			Princeton, Indian Twp Res
Round Pond	542	219	4,294	5,297,000	Charlotte
Howard Lake	527	213	8,542	10,536,000	Calais, Robbinston
Lambert Lake	521	211	11,616	14,328,000	Lambert Lake Twp, T11 R3 NBPP
Jackson Brook Lake	487	197	5,100	6,300,000	Brookton Twp, Forest Twp
Lewey Lake	469	190			Princeton, Indian Twp Res
First Chain Lake	464	188	3,307	4,079,000	Wesley, T26 ED BPP
Upper Oxbrook Lake	434	176	3,910	4,820,000	Talmadge, T6 R1 NBPP
Spruce Mtn Lake	426	172	6,423	7,923,000	Beddington
Schoodic Lake	406	164	8,256	10,184,000	Cherryfield, Columbia, T18 MD BPP
Beddington Lake	393	159	7,199	8,880,000	Beddington
Round Lake	346	140			T18 ED BPP, T19 ED BPP
Lower Oxbrook Lake	341	138	4,394	5,420,000	T6 ND BPP, T6 R1 NBPP
Pleasant Lake	337	136	5,961	7,353,000	Alexander
Second Lake	330	130			T18 ED BPP
Patrick Lake	322	130	3,119	3,847,000	No 14 Twp, Marion Twp
Hound Brook Lake	310	130			Dyer Twp
Lower Cranberry Lake	300	120			T30 MD BPP, T36 MD BPP
Mud Lake	291	118			Forest City Twp
Little Bearce Lake	288	117	2,700	3,300,000	Baring, Meddybemps
Farrow Lake	286	116	8,097	9,988,000	Topsfield
Barrows Lake	253	102	3,608	4,450,000	Crawford
Orange Lake	252	102	2,130	2,630,000	Whiting
Shaw Lake	251	102	2,402	2,963,000	T5 R1 NBPP, T6 R1 NBPP
Drake Lake	250	100	2,335	2,880,000	Forest Twp
Third Chain Lake	233	94	1,907	2,352,000	T26 ED BPP, T37 MD BPP
Silver Pug Lake	212	86	3,858	4,759,000	T26 ED BPP
Peaked Mountain Pond	207	84	3,172	3,913,000	Centerville, Northfield, T19 MD BPP
Montegail Pond	193	78	1,065	1,314,000	T19 MD BPP
Second Machias Lake (Kebumkewis Numchenugmawis)	182	74	1,283	1,583,000	T36 MD BPP, T37 MD BPP
Marks Lake	182	74	1,679	2,071,000	Marshfield
Great Works Pond	182	74	1,819	2,244,000	Edmunds Twp
South Beaverdam Lake	181	73	2,733	3,371,000	T26 ED BPP
Lower Chain Lake	173	70	1,751	2,160,000	T5 ND BPP
North Beaverdam Lake	148	60	1,586	1,956,000	T26 ED BPP
Little Tomah Lake	146	59	1,364	1,682,000	Codyville Plt, Topsfield
Southwest Pond	144	58	2,031	2,505,000	Beddington
Pennamaquan River	142	57			Pembroke
Simsquish Lake	141	57	1,403	1,731,000	Lambert Lake Twp
Third Lake	139	56	1,360	1,680,000	T37 MD BPP
Second Mopang Lake	138	56			Devereaux Twp, T30 MD BPP
Little Cathance Lake	138	56	1,366	1,685,000	No 14 Twp
LaCoute Lake	138	56	946	1,167,000	Vanceboro
Upper Cranberry Lake	133	54			T30 MD BPP
Patten Pond	127	51	949	1,171,000	Codyville Plt, Talmadge, Waite
Long Lake	126	51	1,289	1,590,000	Marion Twp
Indian Lake	126	51	1,257	1,550,000	Whiting
First Lake	123	50	1,253	1,546,000	T37 MD BPP
First Machias Lake (Lower Sabao Usmquasquospem Wiscogosis)	122	49			T37 MD BPP
Little Seavey Lake	111	45	997	1,230,000	Wesley
Fulton Lake	111	45	883	1,089,000	Northfield
Second Lake	104	42	1,004	1,238,000	T37 MD BPP
Seavey Lake	99	40	924	1,140,000	Wesley
Keene Lake	92	37	1,338	1,650,000	Calais
Upper Mud Lake	91	37	973	1,200,000	Alexander
Beaver Lake	90	36	888	1,095,000	Calais
Big Greenland Pond	88	36	1,313	1,620,000	Danforth
Hobart (Edmunds) Lake	82	33	614	757,000	Edmunds Twp
Roaring lake	74	30	243	300,000	Whiting
Lower Mud Lake	74	30			Alexander
Little River Lake	74	30	730	900,000	T43 MD BPP
Grover Lake	74	30	776	957,000	T31 MD BPP
Western Lake	69	28	378	466,000	Robbinston
Woodland Disposal Pond	63	25			Baileyville
Josh Pond	62	25	632	780,000	Whiting
Bowles Lake	62	25	429	529,000	T31 MD BPP
Tomah Lake	59	24	1,200	1,500,000	Forest Twp
Upper Getchell Lake	58	23	559	690,000	T43 MD BPP
Hoese Pug Lake	58	23	770	950,000	T26 ED BPP
Sam Hill Lake	55	22	573	707,000	T31 MD BPP
Lower Getchell Lake	55	22	511	630,000	T43 MD BPP
Crooked Brook Lake	54	22	559	690,000	Forest Twp
Six Mile Lake	53	21	559	690,000	Marshfield, Whitneyville
Knox Lake	53	21	511	630,000	T36 MD BPP
Second Marks Lake	50	20	473	583,000	Marshfield
Middle Deadwater	50	20			Kossuth Twp
Mic-Mac Pond	49	20			Deblois
Little Lake	46	19	450	560,000	Whiting
Flowed Land Pond #1	44	18	428	528,000	Calais
Otter Lake	43	17	338	417,000	Wesley
Orie Lake	43	17	232	286,000	Kossuth Twp, T6 R1 NBPP
Monroe Lake	43	17	428	528,000	T43 MD BPP
Cranberry Pond	43	17	243	300,000	Baring
Little Greenland Pond	42	17	421	519,000	Danforth
Hadley Lake #2	41	17	428	528,000	T24 MD BPP
Conic Lake	40	16	409	504,000	Baring
Vose Pond	38	15	385	475,000	Calais
Keeley Lake	37	15	637	786,000	Marshfield
Shiny Lake	36	15	316	390,000	Marion Twp
Rocky Lake	36	15	370	460,000	T25 MD BPP
Peep Lake	36	15			T30 MD BPP
Lily Lake	36	15	360	440,000	East Machias
Hobart Bog	34	14	348	429,000	Edmunds Twp
Eastern Lake	34	14	491	606,000	Robbinston
Upper Flood Lake	33	13	341	421,000	Talmadge
Simpson Pond	33	13			Roque Bluffs
Pickerel Pond	32	13	244	301,000	Topsfield
Upper Spectacle Lake	31	13	268	331,000	T19 ED BPP
Horse Lake	31	13	304	375,000	T37 MD BPP
Pork Barrel Lake	30	12	316	390,000	T6 R1 NBPP
Lily Lake	30	12			T30 MD BPP
Fourth Lake	30	12	297	366,000	T37 MD BPP
Munson Lake	29	12	389	480,000	T18 ED BPP T19 ED BPP
Lower Spectacle Lake	28	11	268	331,000	T19 ED BPP
First Mopang Lake	28	11			T30 MD BPP
Pine Lake	27	11	275	339,000	Calais
Pickerel Lake	27	11	272	336,000	T30 MD BPP
Horseshoe Pond	27	11	438	540,000	Beddington
Moneymaker Lake	26	11	425	524,000	Robbinston
Little Pickerel Pond	26	11	247	305,000	Brookton Twp
James Pond	26	11	291	359,000	Charlotte
West Pike Brook Pond	25	10	253	312,000	T18 MD BPP
Vining Lake	25	10	321	396,000	Cooper No 14 Twp
Possum Lake	25	10	207	255,000	T26 ED BPP
Merrit Pond	25	10	255	315,000	Deblois
Horseshoe Lake	25	10	243	300,000	Northfield
Coleback Lake	25	10	303	374,000	Charlotte
Trout Lake	24	9.7	235	290,000	T31 MD BPP
Shattuck Lake	24	9.7	230	280,000	Calais, Robbinston
Pretty Pond	24	9.7	211	260,000	T24 MD BPP
McGee Pug Pond	24	9.7			T30 MD BPP
Goose Pond	24	9.7	243	300,000	T24 MD BPP
Flynn Pond	22	8.9	231	285,000	Deblois
Penman Pond	21	8.5	179	221,000	T26 ED BPP, T31 MD BPP
Lily Lake	21	8.5			Trescott Twp
Little Musquash Lake	20	8.1	268	331,000	T37 MD BPP
Enoch Lake	20	8.1			Fowler Twp
Big Pond	20	8.1			Steuben
Beaver Pond	20	8.1			T42 MD BPP
Rand Lake	18	7.3	135	167,000	Robbinston
Little Grover Pond	18	7.3	175	216,000	T31 MD BPP
Indian Lake	18	7.3	122	150,000	Crawford, Wesley, T19 ED BPP
Goulding Lake	18	7.3	115	142,000	Robbinston
Bog Lake	18	7.3	243	300,000	Marion Twp
Black Brook Pond #6	18	7.3			T19 MD BPP T25 MD BPP
Horseshoe Pond	17	6.9	97	120,000	T18 MD BPP
Millpond	16	6.5	170	210,000	Cooper
Long Pond	16	6.5	168	207,000	T18 MD BPP
Hadley Lake #1	16	6.5	163	201,000	T24 MD BPP
Simon Pond	15	6.1	158	195,000	Codyville Plt
Holmes Pond	15	6.1	143	176,000	Whiting
Eastern Lake	14	5.7	129	159,000	Whiting
Otter Pond	13	5.3	29	36,000	T24 MD BPP
Malcome Bog	13	5.3	153	189,000	Topsfield
Ledge (Bald Ledge) Pond	13	5.3	198	244,000	Charlotte
Western Lake	12	4.9	129	159,000	Whiting
Ryan Lake	12	4.9	97	120,000	Baileyville
Pug Lake	12	4.9	146	180,000	Alexander
Carloe Pond	12	4.9	195	241,000	T26 ED BPP
Black Brook Pond #1	12	4.9			T19 MD BPP
Seavey Lake	11	4.5	122	150,000	Marshfield
Oak Pond	11	4.5	126	155,000	Deblois
Little Horseshoe Pond	11	4.5	122	150,000	Beddington
Cranberry Pond	11	4.5	73	90,000	Edmunds Twp

== York County ==
Name	Area		Volume		Adjoining towns
Name	acres	ha	acre-feet	m^{3}	Adjoining towns
Great East Lake	1,776	719	59,993	74,000,000	Acton
Mousam Lake	982	397	18,575	22,912,000	Acton, Shapleigh
Square Pond	877	355	17,973	22,169,000	Acton, Shapleigh
Lake Arrowhead (Ossipee Flowage)	779	315			Limerick, Waterboro
Northeast Pond	685	277	6,938	8,558,000	Acton, Lebanon
Province Lake	650	260			Parsonsfield
Balch Pond	577	234	6,578	8,114,000	Acton, Newfield
Little Ossipee Lake	557	225	10,027	12,368,000	Waterboro
Skelton Flowage	428	173			Buxton, Dayton, Hollis
Milton Pond	395	160	3,629	4,476,000	Lebanon
Estes Lake	387	157	3,128	3,858,000	Alfred, Sanford
Wilson Lake	308	125	5,478	6,757,000	Acton
Bunganut Pond	303	123	5,262	6,491,000	Lyman
Wadley (Wadleigh Roberts) Pond	298	121	488	602,000	Lyman
Long Pond	263	106	5,034	6,209,000	Parsonsfield
Adams (Rock Haven) Pond	228	92	1,676	2,067,000	Newfield
Horn Pond	227	92	3,011	3,714,000	Acton
Kennebunk Pond	199	81	4,082	5,035,000	Lyman
Bell Marsh Reservoir	194	79			York
Bauneg Beg Lake	179	72	1,959	2,416,000	North Berwick, Sanford
Holland (Sokosis) Pond	172	70	1,438	1,774,000	Limerick
West Pond	167	68	1,801	2,222,000	Parsonsfield
Poverty Pond (Big) (Silver Lake)	147	59	1,318	1,626,000	Newfield, Shapleigh
Murdock Lake	144	58	2,119	2,614,000	Berwick
Horne Pond	139	56	2,987	3,684,000	Limington
Chases Pond	135	55	1,411	1,740,000	York
Swan Pond	132	53	2,326	2,869,000	Lyman
Spinney Creek Pond	127	51			Eliot
Shaker Pond	106	43	936	1,155,000	Alfred
Spaulding Pond	104	42			Lebanon
Old Falls Pond	100	40			Kennebunk, Sanford
Loon Pond	95	38	537	662,000	Acton
Boulter Pond	91	37	851	1,050,000	York
Shapleigh Pond	82	33			Newfield, Shapleigh
Shy Beaver Pond	65	26	243	300,000	Shapleigh
Haley Pond	65	26	657	810,000	Cornish
Lake Sherburn	60	24	606	747,000	Shapleigh Waterboro
Killick Pond	60	24	226	279,000	Hollis
Folly Pond	56	23	601	741,000	York
Wards Pond	54	22	579	714,000	Limington
Pickerel Pond	52	21	431	532,000	Limerick
Granny Kent Pond	52	21	535	660,000	Shapleigh
Knight Pond (west)	49	20	442	545,000	South Berwick
York Pond	48	19	317	391,000	Eliot
Pinkham Pond (Hidden Lake)	44	18	370	460,000	Newfield
Number One Pond	44	18	973	1,200,000	Sanford
Alewife Pond	42	17	253	312,000	Kennebunk
Scituate Pond	41	17	101	125,000	York
Turner Pond (Mirror Lake)	40	16	277	342,000	Newfield
Middle Branch Pond	40	16	540	670,000	Alfred Waterboro
Goose Ponds (South)	39	16	486	599,000	Shapleigh
Treatment Pond (South)	38	15			Sanford
Symmes Pond	37	15	454	560,000	Newfield
Middle Pond	37	15	477	588,000	York
Northwest Pond	36	15	214	264,000	Waterboro
Leigh's Mill (Great Work) Pond	36	15			South Berwick
Treatment Pond (East)	34	14			Sanford
Little Ell (L) Pond	34	14	577	712,000	Sanford, Wells
Bartlett Pond	33	13	238	294,000	Lyman, Waterboro
Sand Pond	30	12	292	360,000	Sanford
Websters (Blakes) Mill Pond	29	12			Limington
Mill Pond	28	11			Sanford
Isinglass Pond	28	11	295	364,000	Hollis, Waterboro
Stump Pond	27	11			Sanford
Deer Pond	27	11	544	671,000	Hollis
Moose Pond	26	11	244	301,000	Acton
Hansen Pond	26	11	105	130,000	Acton, Shapleigh
Warren Pond	25	10	386	476,000	South Berwick
Parker (Barker) Pond	25	10	305	376,000	Lyman
Deering Pond	25	10	186	229,000	Sanford
Doles Pond	24	9.7	82	101,000	Limington
Noahs Pond	23	9.3	146	180,000	Parsonsfield
Moody Pond	23	9.3	182	224,000	Waterboro
Bell Marsh Pond	23	9.3			York
Boyd Pond	22	8.9	262	323,000	Limington
Spruce Pond	21	8.5	209	258,000	Parsonsfield
Littlefield Pond	21	8.5	187	231,000	Sanford
Treatment Pond (West)	20	8.1			Sanford
Clark's Mill Pond	20	8.1			Dayton, Hollis
Cox Pond	19	7.7	75	93,000	South Berwick
Randall Lake	18	7.3	216	266,000	Parsonsfield
Old Fishing Pond	17	6.9	170	210,000	Sanford
Mud Pond	17	6.9	48	59,000	Newfield
Hobbs Pond	17	6.9			Wells
Etherington Pond	17	6.9			Biddeford
Treatment Pond (North)	16	6.5			Sanford
Little Poverty Pond	15	6.1	84	104,000	Shapleigh
Passaconway (Summit) Pond	14	5.7	36	44,000	York
Swan Pond	13	5.3	48	59,000	Acton
Smarts Pond	13	5.3			Newfield
Beaver Dam Pond	13	5.3			Berwick
Tarwater Pond	12	4.9	97	120,000	Lyman
Sand Pond	12	4.9	193	238,000	Limington
Curtis Pond	12	4.9	97	120,000	Sanford
Beaver Pond	12	4.9			Kennebunkport
Spicer Pond	11	4.5	97	120,000	Shapleigh

== See also ==
- List of rivers of Maine
