= List of Maine placenames of Native American origin =

The following list includes settlements, geographic features, and political subdivisions of Maine whose names are derived from Native American languages.

== Listings ==
=== Counties ===
- Androscoggin County: (Abnaki) "place where fish are dried/cured"
  - Androscoggin River
  - Little Androscoggin River
  - Androscoggin Lake
- Aroostook County
  - Aroostook River: (Mi'kmaq) "beautiful river"
- Kennebec County
  - Kennebec River: (Abnaki) "long quiet water"
  - Little Kennebec Bay
- Penobscot County: (Abnaki?) tribal name; "place of descending rocks/ledges"
  - Town of Penobscot
  - Penobscot River
  - North Branch Penobscot River
  - West Branch Penobscot River
  - East Branch Penobscot River
  - South Branch Penobscot River
  - Penobscot Bay
  - Penobscot Pond
  - Penobscot Island
  - Little Penobscot Island
- Piscataquis County: (Abnaki) "at the river branch"
  - Piscataquis River
  - West Branch Piscataquis River
  - East Branch Piscataquis River
- Sagadahoc County
  - Sagadahoc Bay

=== Settlements ===
- Allagash River (and town): (Abnaki) "bark shelter"
  - Allagash Lake
  - Allagash Pond
- Arrowsic
  - Arrowsic Island
- Caribou: (Abnaki) kalibu "shoveler" (gets food by pawing or shoveling)
  - Caribou Mountain
- Carrabassett Valley
  - Carrabassett River
- Casco: (Mi'kmaq) muddy
  - Casco Bay
- Damariscotta: (Abnaki) "many alewives"
  - Damariscotta Lake
  - Damariscotta River
- Kenduskeag
  - Kenduskeag Stream
- Kennebunk: (Abnaki) "long sand bar"
  - Kennebunk River
  - Kennebunkport
  - Kennebunk Dam
- Machias
  - Town of Machiasport
- Macwahoc
- Madawaska
- Magalloway: likely of Abnaki origin, meaning "large tail".
  - Magalloway River
  - Little Magalloway River
  - West Branch Little Magalloway River
  - Middle Branch Little Magalloway River
  - West Branch Magalloway River
  - First East Branch Magalloway River
  - Second East Branch Magalloway River
  - Third East Branch Magalloway River
- Mattawamkeag: (Abnaki) "fishing beyond gravel bar" or (Mi'kmaq) "on a sand bar"
  - Mattawamkeag Lake
  - Mattawamkeag River
  - West Branch Mattawamkeag River
  - East Branch Mattawamkeag River
- Mexico
- Millinocket: (Abnaki) "this place is admirable"
  - Town of East Millinocket
  - Millinocket Lake
  - Millinocket Disposal Pond
- Monhegan: (Mi'kmaq or Maliseet) "out-to-sea island"
- New Canada
- Nollesemic: (Abnaki) "resting place at the falls"
  - Nollesemic Lake
- Ogunquit: (Mi'kmaq) "lagoons within dunes"
  - Ogunquit River
- Orono: (Abnaki) purportedly from a Chief Joseph Orono, no translation
- Oquossoc: (Abnaki) "place of trout" (a certain trout-type)
- Passadumkeag: (Abnaki) "rapids over gravel beds"
  - Passadumkeag River
- Sabattus
  - Sabattus River
  - Sabbatus Pond
  - Little Sabattus Pond
- Saco: (Abnaki) "flowing out" or "outlet"
  - Saco River
  - Old Course Saco River
  - Little Saco River
- Sebago: (Abnaki) "big lake"
  - Sebago Lake
- Sebec
  - Sebec River
  - Sebec Lake
- Seboeis
  - Seboeis River
  - Little Seboeis River
  - West Seboeis Stream
  - Seboeis Lake
  - Grand Lake Seboeis
  - Seboeis Deadwater
- Village of Seboomook Lake: (Abnaki) "at the large stream"
  - Seboomook Lake
- Skowhegan (town): (Abnaki) "watching place [for fish]"
- Scopan Lake (and town): (Abnaki) "bear's den"
- Willimantic
- Wiscasset

=== Bodies of Water ===
- Abagadasset River
- Alamoosook Lake
- Annabessacook Lake
- Aziscohos Lake: (Abnaki) "small pine trees"
  - Aziscohos Pond
- Bagaduce River
- Baskahegan Lake
- Big Machia Lake and Little Machia Lake
- Big Madagascal Pond and Little Madagascal Pond
- Bunganock Pond
- Cambolasse Pond
- Cape Neddick River
- Caribou Lake (Island Falls)
  - Caribou Lake (Washburn)
  - Caribou Egg Pond
- Caucomgomoc Lake
  - Caucogomoc Stream
- Chemquasabamticook Lake: (Abnaki) "where there is a large lake and rocks"
- Chesuncook Lake: (Abnaki) "at the principal outlet"
  - Chesuncook Pond
- Chickawaukie Pond
- Chimenticook River
- Chiputneticook Lakes: (Abnaki) "at the place of the big hill stream"
- Cobscook Bay: (Maliseet) "rocks under water"
- Cobbosseecontee Lake: (Abnaki) "many sturgeon"
  - Little Cobbosseecontee Lake
- Cochnewagon Pond
- Cupsuptic River
  - East Branch Cupsuptic River
  - Little East Branch Cupsuptic River
- Cuxabexis Lake
- Daaquam River
- Debsconeag Lakes
  - Debsconeag Deadwater
- Eggemoggin Reach
- Gammon Pond
- Harraseeket River
- Hockomock Bay
- Katahdin Lake
- Kamankeag Pond
- Keewaydin Lake
- Kennebago Lake: (Abnaki) "long/large pond/lake"
  - Little Kennebago Lake
  - Kennebago River
  - West Kennebago Mountain
  - East Kennebago Mountain
  - Kennebago Divide
- Keoka Lake
- Lake Anasagunticook
- Lake Kashwakamak
- Lake Onawa
- Lake Wassookeag
- La Pomkeag Lake
- Lower La Pomkeag Lake
- Little Pushaw Pond
- Lunksoos Lake
- Upper Macwahoc Lake and Lower Macwahoc Lake
- Madawaska River: (Mi'kmaq) "where one river joins another"
  - Little Madawaska River
  - Madawaska Lake
- Manhancock Pond
- Maquoit Bay
- Maranacook Lake
- Massachusetts Bog
- Matagamon Lake: (Abnaki) "far on the other side"
- Mattamiscontis Lake: (Abnaki) "many ale-wives"
  - Little Mattamiscontis Lake
- Mattanawcook Pond
- Mattaseunk Lake
- Medomak River
  - Medomak Pond
  - Little Medomak Pond
- Meduncook River
- Medunkenuk Lake
- Meduxnekeag River
  - North Branch Meduxnekeag River
  - South Branch Meduxnekeag River
  - Meduxnekeag Lake
- Megunticook Lake
  - Megunticook River
- Messalonskee Lake
- Metallak Pond
- Millimagassett Lake
- Minnehonk Lake
- Moccasin Pond
- Mollidgewock Pond
- Molunkus Pond: (Abnaki) "ravine"
  - Molunkus Stream
  - Molunkus Lake
- Mooseleuk Lake
- Mooselookmeguntic Lake: (Abnaki) "moose feeding place" (portage to or big trees at)
- Mousam River
  - Middle Branch Mousam River
  - Mousam Lake
- Munsungan Lake
- Muscongus Bay: (Abnaki) "many/large rock ledges"
- Musquash Lake: (Abnaki) "muskrat"
  - Musquash Pond
- Musquacook Stream: (Abnaki) "muskrat place"
  - Musquacook Lakes
- Nahmakanta Lake: (Abnaki) "many fish"
- Narraguagus Bay
  - Narraguagus River
  - Little Narraguagus River
  - West Branch Narraguagus River (Hancock County)
  - West Branch Narraguagus River (Cherryfield)
  - Narraguagus Lake
- Narramissic River
- Nehumkeag Pond
- Neoutaquet River
- Nequassett Lake
- Nesowadnehunk Lake
  - Little Nesowadnehunk Lake
- Nezinscot River
  - West Branch Nezinscot River
  - East Branch Nezinscot River
- Nicatous Lake
- Nokomis Pond
- Nollesemic Lake
- Ossipee River: (Abnaki) "beyond the water"
  - Little Ossipee River
  - Ossipee Lake
- Papoose Pond
  - Little Papoose Pond
- Parmachenee Lake
- Passamagamet Lake
- Passagassawakeag River
  - Lake Passagassawakeag
- Passamaquoddy Bay: tribal name; "place of abundance of pollack"
- Pattee Pond
- Pemadumcook Chain of Lakes: (Maliseet) "extended sand bar place"
  - Ambajejus
  - Pemadumcook Lake
- Pemaquid River
  - Pemaquid Pond
- Pennamaquan River
- Pennesseewassee Lake
  - Little Pennesseewassee Lake
- Pequawket Lake
- Piscataqua River
  - Piscataqua River (tributary)
  - East Branch Piscataqua River
- Pocasset Lake
- Pocwock River
- Pockwockamus Deadwater
- Podunk Pond
- Presumpscot River
- Pushaw Lake
- Quahog Bay
- Quantabacook Lake
- Rockabema Lake
- Saponac Pond
- Sasanoa River
- Scammon Pond
- Schoodic Lake
  - Schoodic Bog
- Sebago Lake
  - Little Sebago Lake
- Sebasticook River: (Penobscot-Abnaki) "almost-through place"
  - East Branch Sebasticook River
  - Sebasticook Lake
- Sennebec Pond
- Shillalah Pond
- Skitacook Lake
- Songo River
- Spednic Lake
- Sysladobsis Lake
  - Upper Sysladobsis Lake
- Tacoma Lakes
- Umbagog Lake
- Umbazooksus Lake
- Umcolcus Lake: (Abnaki) "whistling duck"
- Umsaskis Lake
- Usuntabunt Lake: (Abnaki) "wet head" or possibly "three heads"
- Wassutaquook River
- Watchic Pond
  - Little Watchic Pond
- Webhannet River: (Abnaki) "at the clear stream"
- Weskeag River
- Wesserunsett Lake
- Wheelock Lake
- Wohoa Bay
- Wytopitlock Lake
- Piscataqua River (New Hampshire border): (Pennacook) "the place where the river divides"

=== Islands ===
- Bunganuc Island
- Chebeague Island: (Abnaki) "separated place"
- Malaga Island
- Manana Island
- Matinicus Island: (Abnaki) "far-out island"
  - Matinicus Rock
- Menigawum Island
- Metinic Island: (Abnaki) "far-out island"
- Mingo Island
- Mosquick Island
- Nahamkeag Island
- Opechee Island
- Sampsong Point
- Schoodic Island
- Schoppee Island
- Sebascodegan Island
- Squantum Point

=== Other ===
- Bauneg Beg Mountain
- Mount Agamenticus
- Mount Katahdin: (Abnaki) "the principal mountain"
- Mount Kineo
- Mount Tire'm
- Pemaquid Point: (Mi'kmaq) "extended land" (peninsula)
- Quoddy Head: (Passamaquoddy) abbreviation to "pollack"
- Shawnee Peak

== See also ==
- List of place names in the United States of Native American origin
