= List of place names of Native American origin in New England =

The region of New England in the United States has numerous place names derived from the indigenous peoples of the area. New England is in the Northeastern United States, and comprises six states: Connecticut, Maine, Massachusetts, New Hampshire, Rhode Island, and Vermont. Listed are well-known names of towns, significant bodies of water, and mountains. This list can virtually never be sufficiently completed as there are hundreds of thousands of place names in New England.

== Formation and transmission of names ==
All the names in this section come only through persons whose first language was English and only rarely knew any other. From the few sources who were bilingual, there is some concept of how some of the names were segmented in the languages from which they came. Those names often tend to predominate in lists such as these, just because they are more easily understood.

Most names were received by English settlers who had little idea what they meant. Being naturally curious, they asked the natives what the names meant or conjectured among themselves or both. The natives were faced with having to explain the name in a language they knew but rudimentarily. They interpreted freely, often giving the use or features of interest about the place rather than trying to explain the elements of their language to the English. They never had a linguist's understanding of the structure of their language. Their descendants, speaking primarily English, no longer knew how to produce meaningful utterances in the language of their native forefathers.

Consequently, the names can be divided into roughly two categories: those for which the original morphology is known to some degree and those for which it is not. The meanings of the latter category are traditional only, but the tradition may not necessarily descend from a native speaker. It may have been a settler's conjecture, passed on through the social mechanism of the sacred words of the forefathers or simply because no other interpretation was available.

The mechanism can be seen most clearly in names for which both categories of meaning exist. One might read that a name is supposed to mean "the place of portage" or "the pines" when in fact those meanings are not even implied by the morphology of the name. It is entirely possible, however, that those places were used for those purposes. On the other hand, some settler may have guessed that they were used for those purposes. In cases where there is no morphology, there is little point in argument over the "correct meaning" of the name, an activity enjoyed by New Englanders since settlement times, and which also you will undoubtedly see much of in Wikipedia.

New England in the early 17th century when English colonists first landed was tenanted by variously named tribes for the most part speaking languages of the Algonquian family. Our aboriginals spoke an eastern branch of the group. It often happened that whole regions were named after the tribe inhabiting it, such as Massachusetts, nor does this appear to have been an English naming convention only. In this the aboriginals were non-different from the tribes of classical Europe, whose names still dot the map of Europe.

Like the tribal names of Europe, the native names descended from an antiquity long lost. The natives themselves may not have known what they meant. For these names we have mainly tradition, but even that should be regarded as more speculative than not.

== Places named after tribes ==
Place names on this list represent a number of tribes speaking aboriginal languages within the Algonquian family, for the most part, if in warped or anglicized form:

- Abnaki
- Hammonassett
- Mahican
- Mattabesset
- Mill
- Mi'kmaq
- Mohegan
- Montauk
- Natick
- Narragansett
- Niantic
- Nipmuc
- Norridgewock
- Passamaquoddy
- Paugussett
- Pennacook
- Penobscot
- Pequot
- Podunk
- Poquonock
- Quinnipiac
- Tunxi
- Wampanoag

== Connecticut ==
Common dialects of the Algonquian languages: Hammonasset, Mahican, Montauk, Niantic, Paugussett, Pequot-Mohegan, Podunk, Poquonock, Quinnipiac, Tunxi, Wangunk

- Connecticut, the state, and river: (in several dialects) "place of the long river" or "by the long tidal stream"
  - Aspetuck River (and town): (Paugussett) "at the high place"
  - Cockenoe Island: (Montauk) from the name of a 17th-century native interpreter
  - Coginchaug River: (Wangunk) "place where fish are dried/cured"
  - Congamuck Ponds (on Massachusetts border Congamond Lake): (Nipmuck) "long fishing place"
  - Cos Cob: (Mohegan from Cassacubque) "high rocks"
  - Hammonassett Point: (Hammonassett) "place of sand bars"
  - Hockanum River (and community): (Podunk) "hook"
  - Housatonic River: (Mahican) "beyond the mountain"
  - Mashapaug Pond: (Nipmuck) "large pond"
  - Massapeag: (Mohegan) "place at the large cove"
  - Menunketesuck River (and Menunketesuck Island): (Hammonasset) "strong flowing stream"
  - Mianus River (and town): (Paugussett) a 17th-century chief's name – "Mianu/Mayanno's"
  - Mohawk Mountain: eastern Iroquois tribe; Algonquian term for their western enemies – "wolves," "hungry animals," or "cannibals"
  - Mohegan: tribe; "hungry animal" or "wolf"
  - Moodus River (also reservoir, and village): (Wangunk) from "mache moodus" or "bad noises" (the Moodus noises)
  - Moosup: (Narragansett) a chief named "Mausup"
  - Mystic River (and town): (Pequot-Mohegan) "great tidal river"
  - Naugatuck River (and town): (Quinnipiac) "single tree"
  - Natchaug River: (Nipmuck) "between rivers"
  - Nepaug Reservoir: (Wangunk) "fresh pond"
  - Niantic River (and town): tribe; "point of land on tidal river"
  - Norwalk River (and city): (Algonquian) noyank or "point of land" or from the name Naramauke
  - Oronoque: (Quinnipiac) "curved place" or "land at the bend"
  - Pachaug River (and pond): (Narragansett) "at the turning place"
  - Pataguanset Lake: (Niantic) "at the round, shallow place"
  - Pawcatuck River (Rhode Island border): (Niantic/Pequot) "the clear divided (tidal) stream"
  - Pequabuck: (Wangunk) "clear, open pond"
  - Pistapaug Pond: (Quinnipiac) "muddy pond"
  - Pocotopaug Lake: (Wangunk) "divided pond" or "two ponds"
  - Poquetanuck: (Mohegan) "land broken up" (like dried mud cracking)
  - Poquonock Bridge and river: (Algonquian – several) "cleared land"
  - Quaddick Reservoir: (Nipmuck) "bend in river" or (Narragansett) "boggy place"
  - Lake Quassapaug: (Quinnipiac) "big pond" or "big rock"
  - Quinebaug River (and town): (Nipmuck) "long pond"
  - Quinnipiac River: (Quinnipiac) "where we change our route"
  - Lake Quonnipaug: (Quinnipiac) "long pond"
  - Sachem Head: (Algonquian/general) "chief"
  - Saugatuck River: (Paugussett) "outlet of the tidal river"
  - Scitico: (Nipmuck) "land at the river branch"
  - Shenipsit Lake: (Mohegan) "at the great pool"
  - Shepaug River: (Tunxis) "great pond"
  - Shetucket River: (Mohegan) "land between rivers"
  - Shunock River: (Mohegan) "stony place" or possibly "place between streams"
  - Skungamug River: (Nipmuck) "eel-fishing place"
  - Taconic: (Mahican) "steep ascent"
  - Uncasville: (Mohegan) 17th-century chief's name (wonkus – "fox")
  - Wangum Lake: (Paugussett) "bend/crooked"
  - Wangumbaug Lake: (Nipmuck) "crooked pond"
  - Wangumgaug Lake: "crooked pond"
  - Lake Waramaug: (Mahican) "good fishing-place"
  - Willimantic River (and town): (Mohegan or Nipmuck) "good cedar swamp"
  - Winnepauk: (Mahican) "beautiful pond"
  - Wononpacook Pond: (Mahican) "land at the bend in the pond"
  - Wononskopomuc Lake: (Mahican) "rocks at the bend in the lake"
  - Wopowaug River: (Wangunk) "crossing-place"
  - Wopowog: (Wangunk) "crossing-place"
  - Wyassup Lake: (Mohegan) "flags" or "rushes"
  - Yantic River (and town): (Mohegan) "as far as the tide goes up this side of the river"
- Former names:
  - Mameeg or Nameeg: (Pequot-Mohegan) "fishing place" New London
  - Miamogue: (Paugussett) "where we come together to fish" Bridgeport (harbor)
  - Nawaas: general name for Connecticut

== Maine ==
Common languages:

- Northern: Abnaki, Maliseet, Mi'kmaq, Passamaquoddy
- Southern: Abnaki, Norridgewock, Pennacook, Penobscot
  - Allagash River (and town): (Abnaki) "bark shelter"
  - Androscoggin River: (Abnaki) "place where fish are dried/cured"
  - Aroostook River: (Mi'kmaq) "beautiful river"
  - Aziscohos Lake: (Abnaki) "small pine trees"
  - Caribou: (Abnaki) kalibu "shoveler" (gets food by pawing or shoveling)
  - Casco Bay: (Mi'kmaq) muddy
  - Chebeague Island: (Abnaki) "separated place"
  - Chemquasabamticook Lake: (Abnaki) "where there is a large lake and roocks"
  - Chesuncook Lake: (Abnaki) "at the principal outlet"
  - Chiputneticook Lakes: (Abnaki) "at the place of the big hill stream"
  - Cobscook Bay: (Maliseet) "rocks under water"
  - Cobbosseecontee Lake: (Abnaki) "many sturgeon"
  - Damariscotta (and lake and river): (Abnaki) "many alewives"
  - Katahdin: (Abnaki) "the principal mountain"
  - Kennebago Lake: (Abnaki) "long/large pond/lake"
  - Kennebec River: (Abnaki) "long quiet water"
  - Kennebunk (and river): (Abnaki) "long sand bar"
  - Madawaska River: (Mi'kmaq) "where one river joins another"
  - Matagamon: (Abnaki) "far on the other side"
  - Matinicus Island: (Abnaki) "far-out island"
  - Mattamiscontis Lake: (Abnaki) "many ale-wives"
  - Mattawamkeag River (and town): (Abnaki) "fishing beyond gravel bar" or (Mi'kmaq) "on a sand bar"
  - Metinic Island: (Abnaki) "far-out island"
  - Millinocket (and lake): (Abnaki) "this place is admirable"
  - Molunkus Pond (and stream): (Abnaki) "ravine"
  - Monhegan Island: (Mi'kmaq or Maliseet) "out-to-sea island"
  - Mooselookmeguntic Lake: (Abnaki) "moose feeding place" (portage to or big trees at)
  - Muscongus Bay: (Abnaki) "many/large rock ledges"
  - Musquash Lake: (Abnaki) "muskrat"
  - Musquacook River (and lake): (Abnaki) "muskrat place"
  - Nahmakanta Lake: (Abnaki) "many fish"
  - Nollesemic (and lake): (Abnaki) "resting place at the falls"
  - Ogunquit: (Mi'kmaq) "lagoons within dunes"
  - Orono: (Abnaki) purportedly from a Chief Joseph Orono, no translation
  - Ossipee River: (Abnaki) "beyond the water"
  - Oquossoc: (Abnaki) "place of trout" (a certain trout-type)
  - Passadumkeag: (Abnaki) "rapids over gravel beds"
  - Passamaquoddy Bay: tribal name; "place of abundance of pollack"
  - Pemadumcook Lake: (Maliseet) "extended sand bar place"
  - Pemaquid: (Mi'kmaq) "extended land" (peninsula)
  - Penobscot River: (Abnaki?) tribal name; "place of descending rocks/ledges"
  - Piscataqua River (New Hampshire border): (Pennacook) "the place where the river divides"
  - Piscataquis River: (Abnaki) "at the river branch"
  - Quoddy Head: (Passamaquoddy) abbreviation to "pollack"
  - Saco (and river): (Abnaki) "flowing out" or "outlet"
  - Sebago Lake (and town): (Abnaki) "big lake"
  - Sebasticook Lake: (Penobscot-Abnaki) "almost-through place"
  - Seboomook Lake (and town): (Abnaki) "at the large stream"
  - Skowhegan (town): (Abnaki) "watching place [for fish]"
  - Squa Pan Lake (and town): (Abnaki) "bear's den"
  - Umcolcus Lake: (Abnaki) "whistling duck"
  - Usuntabunt Lake: (Abnaki) "wet head" or possibly "three heads"
  - Wassutaquook River: sp.
  - Webhannet River: (Abnaki) "at the clear stream"
- Former names:
  - Ahbaysauk: (Abnaki) "place where clams are baked/dried" Bar Harbor
  - Amitgon pontook: (Abnaki) "place at the falls where fish are dried/cured" Lewiston Falls
  - Machegony: (mi'kmaq) "shaped like a large knee" Portland

== Massachusetts ==
Common languages:

- Eastern: Massachusett, Nipmuc, Wampanoag (southeast)
- Western: Natick, Nipmuck, Narragansett (southwest), Pocumtuck
- Massachusetts (the state): (Natick) "by the great hills" (the hills of Milton, Blue Hill, south of Boston)
  - Achastapac: (Pocumtuck) "Land of rivers and mountains"
  - Acoaxet: (Narragansett) "at the fishing promontory" or "place of small pines"
  - Acushnet River (and town): (Naragansett) "at the cove"
  - Agawam: (Nipmuck or Pennacook) "low land" (with water) or "place to unload canoes" (possible portage spot)
  - Annisquam (and river)
  - Assabet River: (Nipmuck) "at the boggy place"
  - Assawompset Pond: Narragansett "trading place"; (Wampanoag) "place of large upright rock"
  - Assinippi: (Wampanoag) "rocks in water"
  - Assonet River (also Cedar Swamp and village): (Narragansett) "at the rock" – the rock in question being Dighton Rock
  - Cataumet: (Wampanoag) "at the ocean" or "landing place"
  - Lake Chaubunagungamaug: (Nipmuck-Mohegan) "boundary fishing place"
  - Chappaquiddick Island: (Wampanoag) "separated island"
  - Chicopee (also falls, and river): (Nipmuck) "violent water"
  - Cochituate: (Natick) "place of swift water"
  - Cohasset: (Natick) "long rocky place"
  - Congamond Lake (on Connecticut border – Congamuck Ponds): (Nipmuck) "long fishing place"
  - Cotuit: (Wampanoag) "long planting field"
  - Cummaquid: (Wampanoag) "harbor"
  - Cuttyhunk: (Wampanoag) "thing that lies out in the sea"
  - Gansett Harbor
  - Mount Greylock: named for a Missisquoi chief
  - Hockanum: (Podunk) "hook"
  - Hockomock Swamp: (Natick-Abnaki) "evil spirit" or "hellish place"; (Narragansett) "hook-shaped place"
  - Hoosac Tunnel: (Mahican) "rock place"
  - Humarock: (Wampanoag) "shell place" or "rock carving"
  - Hyannis: (Wampanoag) name of a 17th-century chief, "Iyanogh's"
  - Jamaica Plain (and pond): (Natick) "beaver"
  - Manhan River: (Nipmuck) "island"
  - Manomet (and point): (Wampanoag) "portage place"
  - Mashpee: (Wampamoag) "place near great cove"
  - Mattapan: (Natick) "resting place" or "end of portage"
  - Mattapoisett: (Wampanoag) "resting place" or "edge of cove"
  - Megansett Harbor
  - Merrimac: (Pennacook) "deep place"
  - Merrimack River: (Abnaki) "at the deep place"
  - Mishaum Point: (Narragansett) "great neck" or "canoe-landing place"
  - Lake Monomonac (NH border): (Abnaki) "at the very deep place"
  - Monatiquot River (Massachusett) "a lookout-out place"
  - Monomoy Island (and point): (Wampanoag) "look-out place" or "deep water"
  - Muskeget Island (and channel): (Wampanoag) "grassy place"
  - Mystic River: (Natick) "great tidal stream"
  - Nabnasset: (Nipmuck)
  - Nagog Pond: Concord water supply located in Acton
  - Nahant: (Natick) "the point" or "almost an island"
  - Nantasket Beach: (Natick/Wampanoag) "at the strait" or "low-tide place"
  - Nantucket Island: (Wampanoag) "in the midst of waters"; (Naragansett) far off, among the waves
  - Nashawena Island: (Wampanoag) "between"
  - Nashoba Brook
  - Natick: tribe; "the place I seek" or "home," "place," "clearing"
  - Naushon Island: (Wampanoag) "middle" (no clear translation)
  - Nemasket River: (Wampanoag) "place where the fish are"
  - Neponset River: (Natick) possibly "a good fall" (easy for canoe travel)
  - Nonamesset Island: (Wampanoag)
  - Nissitissit: (Nipmuc) "two brooks" or "between two brooks"
  - Nonquitt: (Narragansett) "dry or landing place"
  - Onota Lake: (Mahican) "blue/deep"
  - Pasque Island
  - Penikese Island
  - Pocasset: (Natick) "where the stream widens"
  - Pontoosuc: (Mahican or Nipmuck) "falls on the brook"
  - Punkatasset Hill (Algonquian)
  - Quabbin Reservoir: (Nipmuck) "crooked streams"
  - Quaboag River: (Nipmuck) "before the pond" or abbreviation of "red pond" (m'squ'boag)
  - Quinebaug River: (Nipmuck) "long pond"
  - Lake Quinsigamond: (Nipmuck) "pickerel-fishing place
  - Quequechan River: (Wampanoag) "falling river"
  - Quissett: (Nipmuck) "at the place of small pines"
  - Sagamore: (Wampanoag) "chief"
  - Santuit: (Wampanoag) "cool water place"
  - Saugus: (Natick) "outlet"
  - Scituate: (Wampanoag) "at the cold spring or brook"
  - Seekonk: (Narragansett) "wild black goose" or (Wampanoag) "mouth of stream" or "wild goose"
  - Segreganset River: (Narragansett) "place of hard rocks"
  - Shawmut Peninsula: (Algonquian) "ferry" or "place to draw up canoes"
  - Siasconset: (Narragansett) "at the place of many/great bones" (whales?)
  - Sippewissett (Wampanoag) "at the little river"
  - Snipatuit Pond: (Wampanoag) "at the rocky river"
  - Squannacook River: (Nipmuc) "place for taking salmon"
  - Squibnocket Point (and pond): (Wampanoag) "at the place of dark rocks" (or clay cliff)
  - Swampscott: (Natick) "place of red rocks"
  - Succanessett (Wampanoag) "place of black shells"
  - Taconic Mountains: (Natick) "steep ascent"
  - Tantiusques: (Nipmuck) "black stuff between the hills"
  - Tuckernuck Island: (Wampanoag) "round loaf of bread"
  - Uncatena Island (Womanoag) "like a hill" or "end of the hill" or "shows from afar"
  - Mount Wachusett (and reservoir): (Natick) "near the mountain"
  - Waquoit: (Wampanoag) "at the end"
  - Mount Watatic: (Nipmuck)
  - Watuppa Ponds: (Wampanoag) "roots"
  - Weepecket Islands (Wampanoag) Possibly from Wanbackuck, "white headed eagle" or "osprey"
  - Weweantic River: (Wampanoag) "crooked" or "wandering stream"
  - Wianno
  - Minnechaug Regional High School: (Algonquian) "Land of Berries"
  - Woronoco: (Nipmuck) "winding about"
- Former names:
  - Capawack or Capoag: (Wampanoag) "enclosed harbor" Martha's Vineyard
  - Cohannet: (Wampanoag or Narragansett) "at the long or pine place" Taunton
  - Poughkeeste: (Wampanoag) "bay with coves" Buzzards Bay

== New Hampshire ==
Common Languages: Abnaki, Nipmuc, Pennacook

  - Ammonoosuc River (Upper and Lower): (Abnaki) "small, narrow fishing place"
  - Amoskeag: (Pennacook) "fishing place" Manchester
  - Ashuelot River (and pond): (Pennacook or Natick) "place between"
  - Canobie Lake: (Abnaki) "abundant water"
  - Contoocook (and river and lake): (Pennacook) "place of the river near pines" or (Abnaki) "nut trees river" or (Natick) "small plantation at the river"
  - Coös: (Pennacook) "pine tree"
  - Hooksett: (Pennacook) possible abbreviation of Annahooksett "place of beautiful trees"
  - Mascoma River (and lake): (Abnaki) "much grass" or "salmon fishing" or "red rocks"
  - Massabesic Lake: (Abnaki) "near the great brook"
  - Merrimack River (and town)
  - Mount Monadnock: (Natick) "at the most prominent island" (-like mountain)
  - Mount Moosilauke: (Abnaki) "good moose place" or "at the smooth place"
  - Nashua River (and city): (Pennacook/Nipmuck) "between streams"
  - Ossipee River (and town and lake): (Abnaki) "beyond the water"
  - Paugus Bay: (Abnaki) "small pond"
  - Pawtuckaway Lake (and mountains): (Abnaki) "falls in the river" or "clear, shallow river"
  - Pemigewasset River: (Abnaki) "extensive rapids"
  - Pennacook (village): tribal name; "at the foothills"
  - Piscataqua River (Maine border): (Pennacook) "place where the river divides"
  - Piscataquog River: (Abnaki) "place where the river divides"
  - Souhegan River: (Pennacook or Nipmuck) "watching place"
  - Squam Lake (and river): (Abnaki) "salmon"
  - Lake Sunapee (and town): (Pennacook) "rocks in the water", "rocky pond"
  - Suncook River (also lakes and village): (Pennacook) "rocky place"
  - Umbagog Lake: (Abnaki) "clear lake"
  - Lake Winnipesaukee (and river): (Pennacook) "land around the lakes" or "good land around lake at mountains"
  - Lake Winnisquam: (Abnaki) "salmon-fishing place"
- Former names:
  - Kodaak wadso: (Abnaki) "summit of the highest mountain" Mount Washington

== Rhode Island ==
Common languages:

- Northern: Natick, Nipmuc
- Southern: Narragansett
  - Apponaug: (Narragansett) "where oysters/shellfish are roasted" or "waiting place"
  - Aquidneck Island: (Narragansett) "at the island"
  - Canonchet: a 17th-century Narragansett chief
  - Chepachet: (Narragansett) "boundary/separation place"
  - Conanicut Island: (Narragansett) named for a 17th-century chief Canonicus
  - Conimicut: (Narragansett) thought to be named for granddaughter of Canonicus (see above)
  - Mount Hope: (from Narragansett Montop or Montaup) "look-out place" or "well-fortified island"
  - Narragansett Bay (and town): tribe: "at the narrow point"
  - Natick: tribe; "the place I seek" or "home"
  - Pascoag (and river): (Nipmuck) "the dividing place" (of river)
  - Pawtucket: (Narragansett) "at the falls in the river (tidal stream)"
  - Pettaquamscutt Rock (and river): Narragansett) "at the round rock"
  - Pontiac: famous mid-18th century Ottawa chief
  - Quonochontaug: (Narragansett) "home of the blackfish"
  - Sakonnet River (and point): (Narragansett) "rainy place"
  - Scituate Reservoir: (Wampanoag) "at the cold spring/brook"
  - Shawomet: (Narragansett) "at the peninsula/neck" (canoe-landing place)
  - Usquepaugh: (Narragansett) "at the end of the pond"
  - Weekapaug: (Narragansett) "at the end of the pond"
  - Woonsocket: (Nipmuck) "place of steep descent"
  - Wyoming: (Delaware) "large prairie"
- Former names:
  - Aquidnic: (Narragansett) "the island" Rhode Island
  - Niwosaket: (Narragansett) "place of two brooks" Woonsocket
  - Manisses: (Narragansett) "little god"; (Niantic) "little island" Block Island
  - Mattoonuc Neck: (Niantic) "place at look-out hill" Point Judith
  - Maushapogue: (Narragansett) "land at the great cove" Cranston

== Vermont ==
Common languages: Abnaki, Mahican

  - Mount Ascutney (and village): (Abnaki) "at the end of the river fork"
  - Lake Bomoseen (and town): (Abnaki) "keeper of ceremonial fire"
  - Hoosac Mountains: (Mahican) "stone place"
  - Hoosic River
  - Lake Iroquois: (Abnaki-French) "real adders" (describing western enemies of Abnaki)
  - Jamaica: (Natick) "beaver"
  - Maquam Bay
  - Lake Memphremagog: (Abnaki) "where there is great expanse of water"
  - Mettawee River
  - Missisquoi River: tribal name
  - Monadnock Mountain: (Abnaki) "at the mountain which sticks up like an island" (see New Hampshire)
  - Moosalamoo Mountain: (Abnaki) "moose trail"
  - Netop Mountain: (Natick) "my friend"
  - Nickwaket Mountain: (Abnaki) "at the fork" or "home of squirrels"
  - Nulhegan River: (Abnaki) "log trap" or "deadfall"
  - Ompompanoosuc River: (Abnaki) "mushy/quaky land"
  - Ottauquechee River: (uncertain – Natick?) "swift mountain stream"
  - Passumpsic River (and village): (Abnaki) "flowing over clear, sandy bottom"
  - Pico Peak: (possibly Abnaki) "the pass/opening"
  - Pompanoosuc: abbreviation of Ompompanoosuc
  - Popasquash Island
  - Quechee: abbreviation of Ottauquechee
  - Queneska Island: (Abnaki) "elbow" or "long joint"
  - Walloomsac River
  - Winooski River (and city): (Abnaki) "wild onions"
- Former names:
  - Mozodepo wadso: (Abnaki) "moose-head mountain" Mount Mansfield
  - Tawakbodee-esso wadso: (Abnaki) "resting place/sit-down mountain" Camel's Hump

== See also ==
- Indian reservation
- List of U.S. communities with Native American majority populations
- List of place names in Canada of Aboriginal origin
- List of placenames of indigenous origin in the Americas
- Algonquian
