= Seboeis =

Seboeis may refer to:

- Seboeis Plantation, Maine, United States
- Seboeis Lake, Maine
- Seboeis River, Maine

== See also ==
- Little Seboeis River, Maine
