= South Twin Lake =

South Twin Lake may refer to:

- South Twin Lake, Maine
- South Twin Lake in Lyon County, Minnesota
- South Twin Lake in Mahnomen County, Minnesota
- South Twin Lake (Wisconsin)
- South Twin Lake in Taylor County, Wisconsin
- South Twin Lake in Canada, Nova Scotia
