= Allagash =

Allagash may refer to:

- Allagash River, a tributary of the St. John River
- Allagash, Maine, a town in Maine named after the river
- Allagash Brewing Company, a brewery in Portland, Maine
- Allagash Lake, original source of the Allagash River, diverted to Penobscot River by Telos Cut
- Allagash Wilderness Waterway, a state wilderness area in Maine
- Blood and Money, a film with working title Allagash
