= Ragged Lake (Maine) =

Lake in Piscataquis County, Maine, United States

- Location within Maine Location within the United States
- Location: Piscataquis County, Maine
- Coordinates: 45°47′N 69°22′W
- Primary outflows: Ragged Stream
- Basin countries: United States
- Max. length: 6.5 mi (10.5 km)
- Max. width: 1.5 mi (2.4 km)
- Surface area: 2,605 acres (1,054 ha)
- Max. depth: 54 feet (16 m)
- Water volume: 42,029 acre⋅ft (51,842,000 m^{3})
- Surface elevation: 1,135 ft (346 m)

Ragged Lake is the source of Ragged Stream in the North Maine Woods. The original lake in Maine range 13 townships 2 and 3 was flooded and expanded by a concrete dam built 2 miles (3.2 km) downstream. The resulting reservoir created a large shallow area with two basins deeper than 30 feet (9.1 m). Summer dissolved oxygen concentrations are low in the deep basins. Conditions have become more favorable for fallfish and longnose sucker than for the native brook trout. Bear Brook enters the south end of the lake, and supports a spawning run of rainbow smelt. Ragged Stream flows 4 miles (6.4 km) from the dam at the south end of Ragged Lake into the Caribou Lake arm of Chesuncook Lake.
