= Caucomgomoc Lake =

- Location within Maine Location within the United States
- Location: Piscataquis County, Maine
- Coordinates: 46°12′N 69°34′W
- Lake type: Reservoir
- Primary inflows: Loon Stream
- Primary outflows: Caucomgomoc Stream
- Basin countries: United States
- Max. length: 5.6 mi (9.0 km)
- Max. width: 1.6 mi (2.6 km)
- Surface area: 4,594 acres (1,859 ha)
- Max. depth: 79 feet (24 m)
- Water volume: 103,839 acre⋅ft (128,084,000 m^{3})
- Surface elevation: 997 ft (304 m)

Caucomgomoc Lake is in the North Maine Woods at the corner of townships 6 and 7 in ranges 14 and 15. Loon Stream flows into the southern end of the lake from Loon Lake, Bear Pond, Big Hurd Pond, Little Hurd Pond, Bear Brook Pond, McDougal Pond, and tributaries from the southwest. Overflow from Little Shallow Lake through Shallow Lake, Daggett Pond, and Round Pond enters the east side of Caucomgomoc Lake through Ciss Stream. Smaller tributaries Avery Brook, Middle Brook, and Ramsell Brook flow into the north end of the lake. There is a dam at the lake outlet on the eastern shore a short distance south of Ciss Stream. Discharge through the dam flows down Caucomgomoc Stream through Black Pond and Chesuncook Lake to the West Branch Penobscot River at Ripogenus Gorge. White perch and yellow perch have largely replaced historic trout populations in the lake.
