= District No. 2 School (Passadumkeag, Maine) =

- U.S. National Register of Historic Places
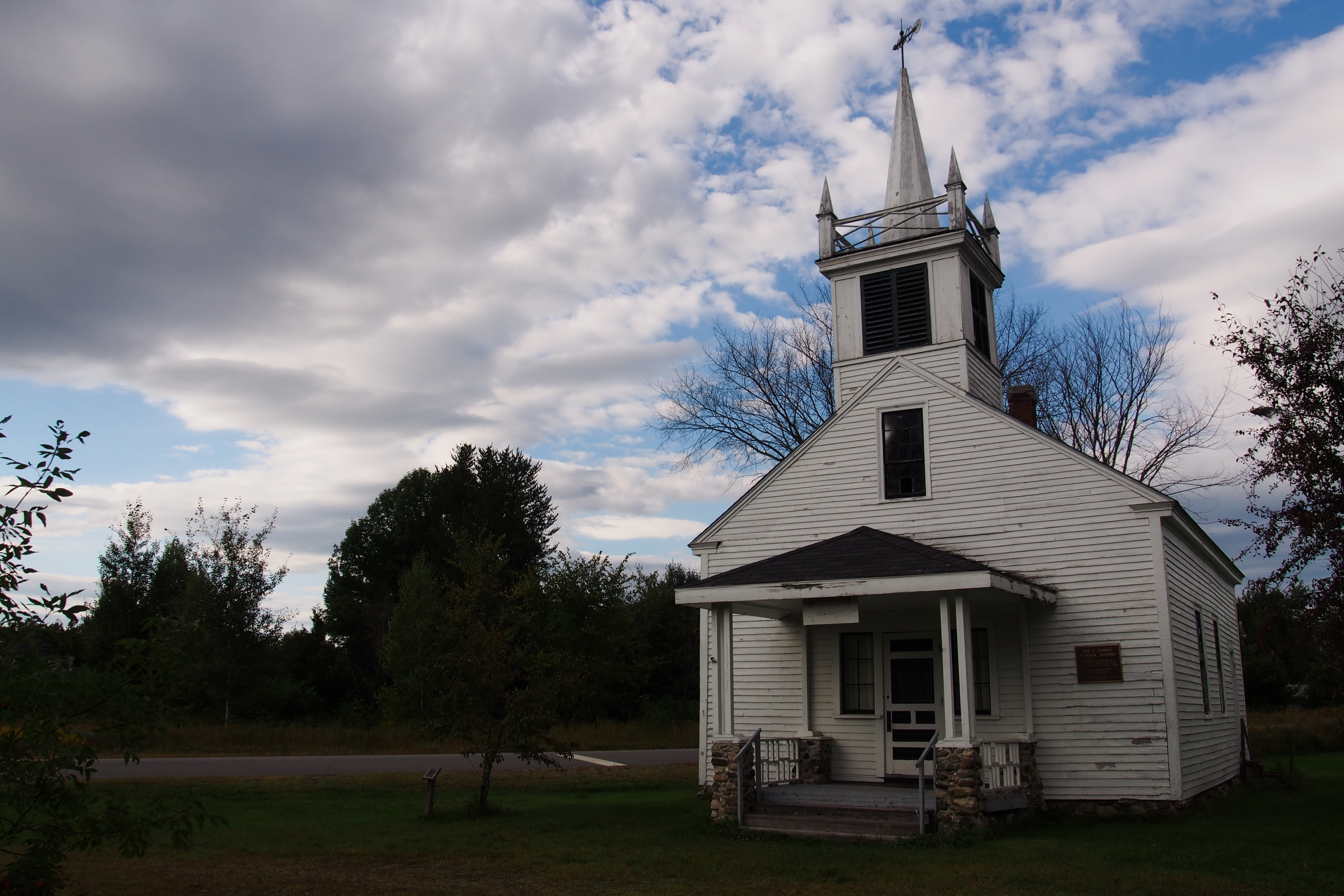

- Location within Maine Location within the United States
- Location: Jct. of Pleasant St. and Caribou Rd., SE corner, Passadumkeag, Maine
- Coordinates: 45°11′7″N 68°36′51″W
- Area: less than one acre
- Built: 1843
- Architectural style: Gothic Revival, Greek Revival
- NRHP reference No.: 97000309
- Added to NRHP: April 15, 1997

The District No. 2 School is a historic schoolhouse at Pleasant Street and Caribou Road in Passadumkeag, Maine. Built in the 1840s as a school, it later served as a church, town hall, and library. It is now a museum operated by the local historical society, and was listed on the National Register of Historic Places in 1997.

== Description and history ==
The District No. 2 School is located in Passadumkeag Village, at the northeast corner of Pleasant Street and Caribou Road, a short way east of Main Street (United States Route 2). It is a single-story wood-frame structure, with a gable roof, clapboard siding, and a rubblestone foundation. Its main facade has a hip-roofed porch sheltering the entrance, supported by clustered columns. The entrance is flanked by fixed-sash windows, with a movable sash window in the gable above the porch. A square tower rises above the entrance, with a louvered belfry topped by a small spire surrounded by a pinnacled balustrade. The interior is composed of a large main room, which occupies the front two-thirds of the building, and a smaller room at the rear.

The schoolhouse was built sometime in the 1840s, and served the town's district encompassing its village center until 1902. It also served as a meeting place for local Baptist and Congregational churches until c. 1905. In 1915 the building was converted for use as a library, at which time the porch and interior room layout were added. Between 1946 and 1968 it was again used as a school, and in 1971 it was sold by the town and converted into a private residence. In 1986 the town bought it back, and gave it to the local historical society, which has restored it and established its museum there.

== See also ==
- National Register of Historic Places listings in Penobscot County, Maine
