= Montsweag Bay =

Bay in Sagadahoc County, Maine, United States

Coordinates: 43.925°N 69.713°W

Montsweag Bay is a small brackish water bay near Wiscasset, Maine. It connects to Hockomock Bay, which connects with many more bays and eventually to the Atlantic Ocean. The peninsula known as Chewonki Neck juts out into the bay between Westport Island and the town of Woolwich and is the home of the Chewonki Foundation.

== See also ==
- List of bays of Maine
