= Nahmakanta Lake =

Lake in Maine, United States

- Location within Maine Location within the United States
- Location: Piscataquis County, Maine
- Coordinates: 45°45′N 69°08′W
- Primary outflows: Nahmakanta Stream
- Basin countries: United States
- Max. length: 3.5 mi (5.6 km)
- Surface area: 986 acres (399 ha)
- Max. depth: 110 feet (34 m)
- Water volume: 47,774 acre⋅ft (58,928,000 m^{3})
- Surface elevation: 646 ft (197 m)

Nahmakanta Lake is the source of Nahmakanta Stream in the North Maine Woods. Nahmakanta Stream flows 4 miles (6.4 km) from the southeast end of the lake in Maine Township 1, Range 11, to the Pemadumcook Chain of Lakes in Township 1, Range 10. The Appalachian Trail follows Nahmakanta Stream and the southwest shore of Nahmakanta Lake. The northwest end of the lake in Township 2, Range 11, receives drainage from Rainbow Lake via Rainbow Stream, from Gould Pond via Gould Brook, from the Bean Ponds via Bean Brook, and from Female Pond, Wadleigh Pond, the Musquash Ponds, and Pollywog Pond via Pollywog Brook. These streams provide spawning habitat for brook trout and land-locked Atlantic salmon, while lake trout spawn in the shoals of the lake.
