= Hockomock Bay =

Coordinates: 43°53′34″N 69°44′45″W

Hockomock Bay, located in Sagadahoc County, Maine, is a small brackish water bay connected to Montsweag Bay. It is located in the area of Wiscasset, and Bath, Maine. The Chewonki Foundation is near Hockomock Bay.

== Notable residence ==
- Robert L. Dale
