= Rainbow Lake (Maine) =

Lake in Maine, United States

- Location within Maine Location within the United States
- Location: Piscataquis County, Maine
- Coordinates: 45°49′N 69°07′W
- Lake type: oligotrophic
- Primary outflows: Rainbow Stream
- Basin countries: United States
- Max. length: 4 mi (6.4 km)
- Max. width: 0.62 mi (1 km)
- Surface area: 1,626 acres (658 ha)
- Max. depth: 130 ft (40 m)
- Water volume: 63,348 acre⋅ft (78,139,000 m^{3})
- Surface elevation: 1,050 ft (320 m)

Rainbow Lake is the source of Rainbow Stream in Rainbow township in the North Maine Woods. Rainbow Stream discharges over a dam at the west end of the lake and flows 4 miles (6.4 km) south to Nahmakanta Lake. Nahmakanta Lake overflows through Nahmakanta Stream and Pemadumcook Chain of Lakes to the Penobscot River. The Appalachian Trail follows Rainbow Stream and the south shore of the lake; but the old logging road to the dam has deteriorated with boggy areas no longer passable by four-wheel drive vehicles. The lake has a small catchment basin and is surrounded by large granite boulders. The low nutrient input in this setting produces unusually clear water. The lake has a native population of brook trout.
