= Gero Island =

Island in Piscataquis County, Maine, United States

Coordinates: 46.073°N 69.377°W

Person kayaking along the shoreline of Gero Island

Gero Island is a large island on Chesuncook Lake in Piscataquis County, Maine, United States. The island is 3,175 acres (1,285 ha) in area, with all but 133 acres (54 ha) regulated. It is known for exemplary natural communities of slender rush as well as white pine forest and lower elevation spruce-fir forest. Chesuncook Lake was created by damming the West Branch Penobscot River in the 19th and early 20th centuries.

Most of the island's original trees were cut in the 1920s, while more were cut in the 1980s during a spruce budworm outbreak. There are four campsites along the shoreline. The island is part of the Maine Natural Areas Program and is considered publicly owned reserved land, open for camping and recreation year-round.
