= Passadumkeag, Maine =

Town in Maine, United States

- Town
- Location within Maine Location within the United States
- Coordinates: 45°12′25″N 68°36′38″W
- Country: United States
- State: Maine
- County: Penobscot

Area
  - Total: 23.07 sq mi (59.75 km^{2})
  - Land: 22.92 sq mi (59.36 km^{2})
  - Water: 0.15 sq mi (0.39 km^{2})
- Elevation: 148 ft (45 m)

Population (2020)
  - Total: 356
  - Density: 16/sq mi (6/km^{2})
- Time zone: UTC-5 (Eastern (EST))
  - Summer (DST): UTC-4 (EDT)
- ZIP code: 04475
- Area code: 207
- FIPS code: 23-57045
- GNIS feature ID: 582663
- Website: https://townofpassadumkeag.com/

Passadumkeag (Penobscot: pαsítαmkik) is a town on the east bank of the Penobscot River at the confluence with the Passadumkeag River in Penobscot County, Maine, United States. The population was 356 at the 2020 census. Passadumkeag or pαsítαmkik is a word of the Penobscot people meaning "at the land beyond the gravel bar", also glossed as "quick water".

== History ==
The name "Passadumkeag" derives from the Penobscot language and means "at the land beyond the gravel bar". The area was originally inhabited by the Penobscot Nation, who used the river and surrounding forests for hunting, fishing, and travel. European-American settlement began in the early 19th century, with sawmills established along the river to process timber floated downstream.

== Geography ==
According to the United States Census Bureau, the town has a total area of 23.07 square miles (59.75 km^{2}), of which 22.92 square miles (59.36 km^{2}) is land and 0.15 square miles (0.39 km^{2}) is water.

== Historic building ==
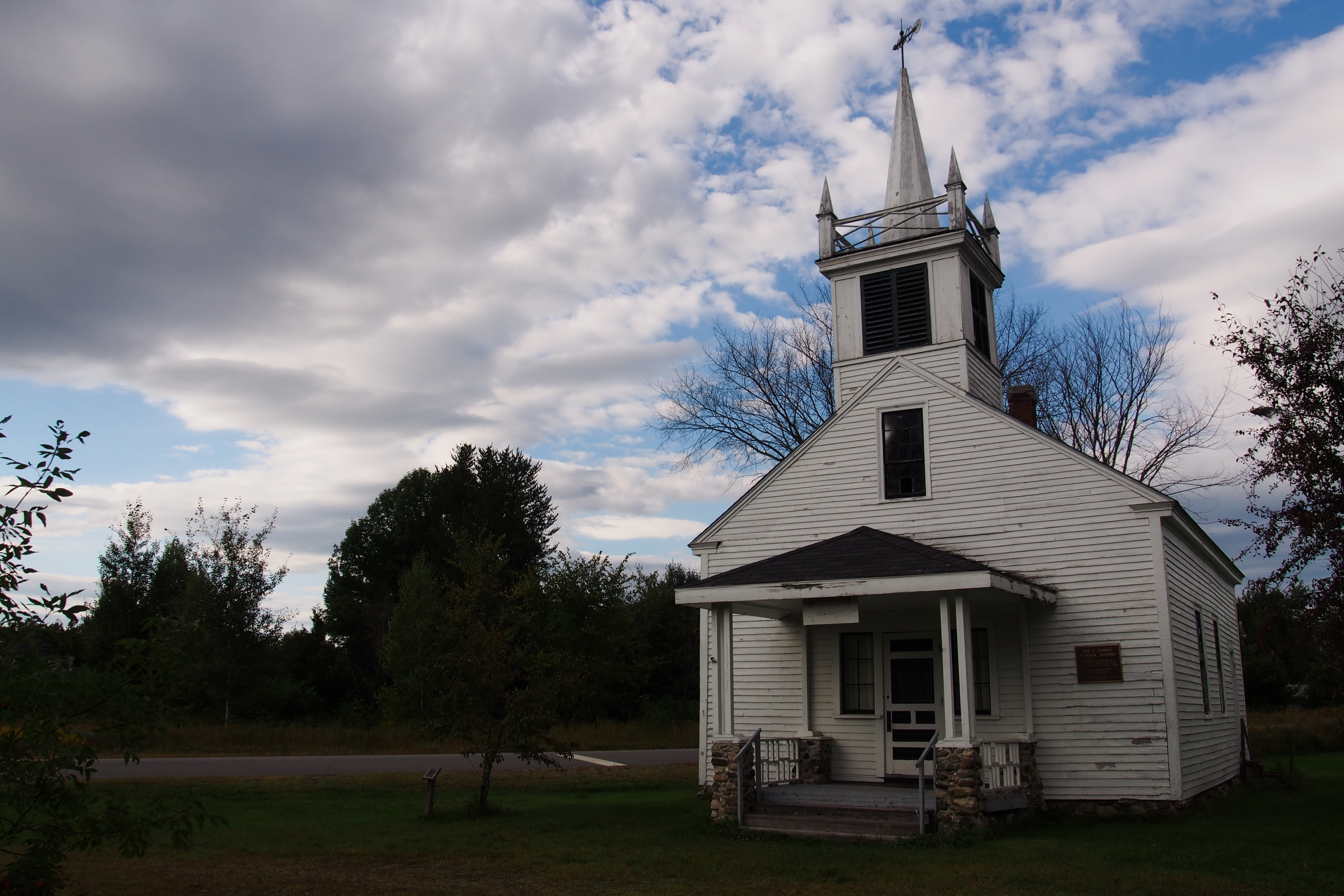
The Schoolhouse on Pleasant St.

The District No. 2 Schoolhouse in Passadumkeag is listed on the National Register of Historic Places.

== Demographics ==
Historical population
Census	Pop.	Note	%±
1830	269		—
1840	394		46.5%
1850	295		−25.1%
1860	360		22.0%
1870	243		−32.5%
1880	302		24.3%
1890	343		13.6%
1900	409		19.2%
1910	445		8.8%
1920	354		−20.4%
1930	325		−8.2%
1940	277		−14.8%
1950	331		19.5%
1960	355		7.3%
1970	326		−8.2%
1980	430		31.9%
1990	428		−0.5%
2000	441		3.0%
2010	374		−15.2%
2020	356		−4.8%
U.S. Decennial Census

=== 2010 census ===
As of the census of 2010, there were 374 people, 159 households, and 103 families living in the town. The population density was 16.3 inhabitants per square mile (6.3/km^{2}). There were 197 housing units at an average density of 8.6 per square mile (3.3/km^{2}). The racial makeup of the town was 95.5% White, 0.8% Native American, 0.5% Asian, and 3.2% from two or more races. Hispanic or Latino of any race were 0.8% of the population.

There were 159 households, of which 27.0% had children under the age of 18 living with them, 51.6% were married couples living together, 8.2% had a female householder with no husband present, 5.0% had a male householder with no wife present, and 35.2% were non-families. 27.0% of all households were made up of individuals, and 11.3% had someone living alone who was 65 years of age or older. The average household size was 2.35 and the average family size was 2.81.

The median age in the town was 45.1 years. 20.3% of residents were under the age of 18; 7.2% were between the ages of 18 and 24; 22.2% were from 25 to 44; 31.5% were from 45 to 64; and 18.7% were 65 years of age or older. The gender makeup of the town was 48.9% male and 51.1% female.

=== 2000 census ===
As of the census of 2000, there were 441 people, 172 households, and 129 families living in the town. The population density was 19.2 people per square mile (7.4/km^{2}). There were 203 housing units at an average density of 8.9 per square mile (3.4/km^{2}). The racial makeup of the town was 98.41% White, 0.45% Native American, 0.23% Pacific Islander, and 0.91% from two or more races. Hispanic or Latino of any race were 0.45% of the population.

There were 172 households, out of which 32.6% had children under the age of 18 living with them, 66.9% were married couples living together, 5.8% had a female householder with no husband present, and 25.0% were non-families. 21.5% of all households were made up of individuals, and 9.9% had someone living alone who was 65 years of age or older. The average household size was 2.56 and the average family size was 2.94.

In the town, the population was spread out, with 26.3% under the age of 18, 7.3% from 18 to 24, 29.7% from 25 to 44, 21.8% from 45 to 64, and 15.0% who were 65 years of age or older. The median age was 39 years. For every 100 females, there were 97.8 males. For every 100 females age 18 and over, there were 100.6 males.

The median income for a household in the town was $35,250, and the median income for a family was $40,625. Males had a median income of $38,194 versus $22,083 for females. The per capita income for the town was $15,812. About 8.8% of families and 11.6% of the population were below the poverty line, including 13.9% of those under age 18 and 8.1% of those age 65 or over.

== 2022 shutdown ==
In April 2022, the town government "effectively shut down" for two months after the resignation of a single employee left the town without a town clerk, when she was denied a two-week vacation. At the time the town also did not have a code enforcement officer, animal control officer, or tax assessor.

== Notable people ==
- Solomon Comstock, US congressman from Minnesota (1889–1891)
- Lawrence E. Lockman, Maine state legislator

== See also ==
- List of municipalities in Maine
- List of Maine placenames of Native American origin
- List of place names of Native American origin in New England
- School Administrative Unit 31
