= Nabnasset, Massachusetts =

Village in Westford, Massachusetts

Coordinates: 42°36′45″N 71°25′13″W

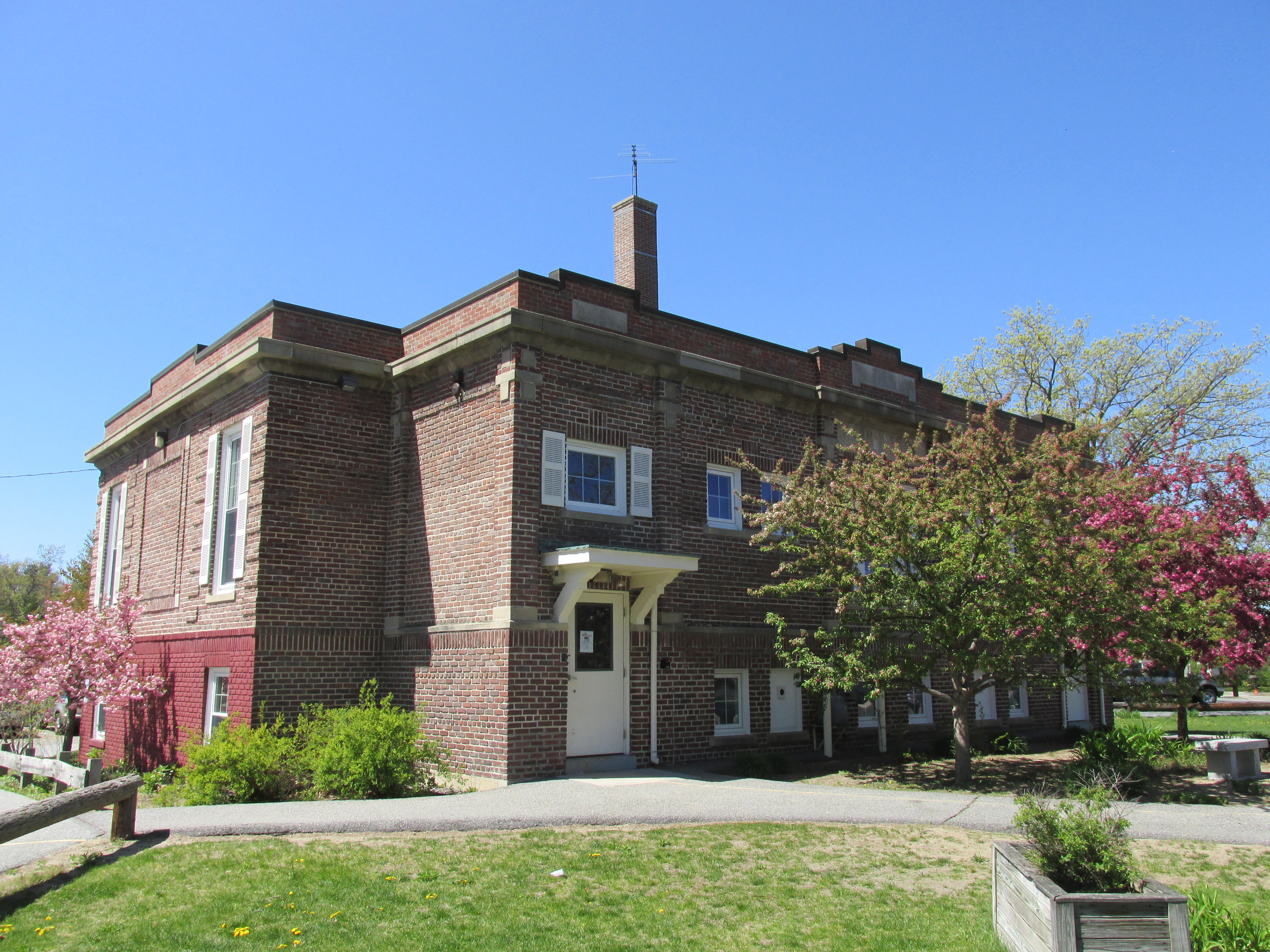
Nabnasset Grade School

Nabnasset is a village located in the northeastern portion of Westford, Massachusetts, United States, between North Chelmsford, Tyngsboro, Graniteville and Westford Center.

The village began as a farming community and consists of predominantly smaller homes near Nabnasset Lake, although there are no clear village boundaries. Here, one can find much more affordable housing along with a strong neighborhood culture. Although the rumors, it is a relatively safe area with low amounts of crime.

The Nabnasset area of Westford is known of its schools of Nabnasset Grade School (Old Nab) and Nabnasset Elementary School (Nab). The area also contains Edward's Beach, a beach to Nabnasset Lake located on Williams Road and is free to Westford residents, but which will cost non-residents $5.00 to visit. The lake contains fish such as Largemouth bass, Yellow perch, and Smallmouth bass.
