= Chewonki Foundation =

US non-profit organization

The Chewonki Foundation
- Foundation logo showing the osprey mascot
- Formation: 1915
- Type: Non-profit
- Headquarters: Wiscasset, Maine, United States
- Coordinates: 43°57′0″N 70°42′10″W
- Services: Educational programs
- Website: www.chewonki.org

The Chewonki Foundation is a non-profit institution in Wiscasset, Maine, which runs educational programs with an environmental focus.

== Background ==
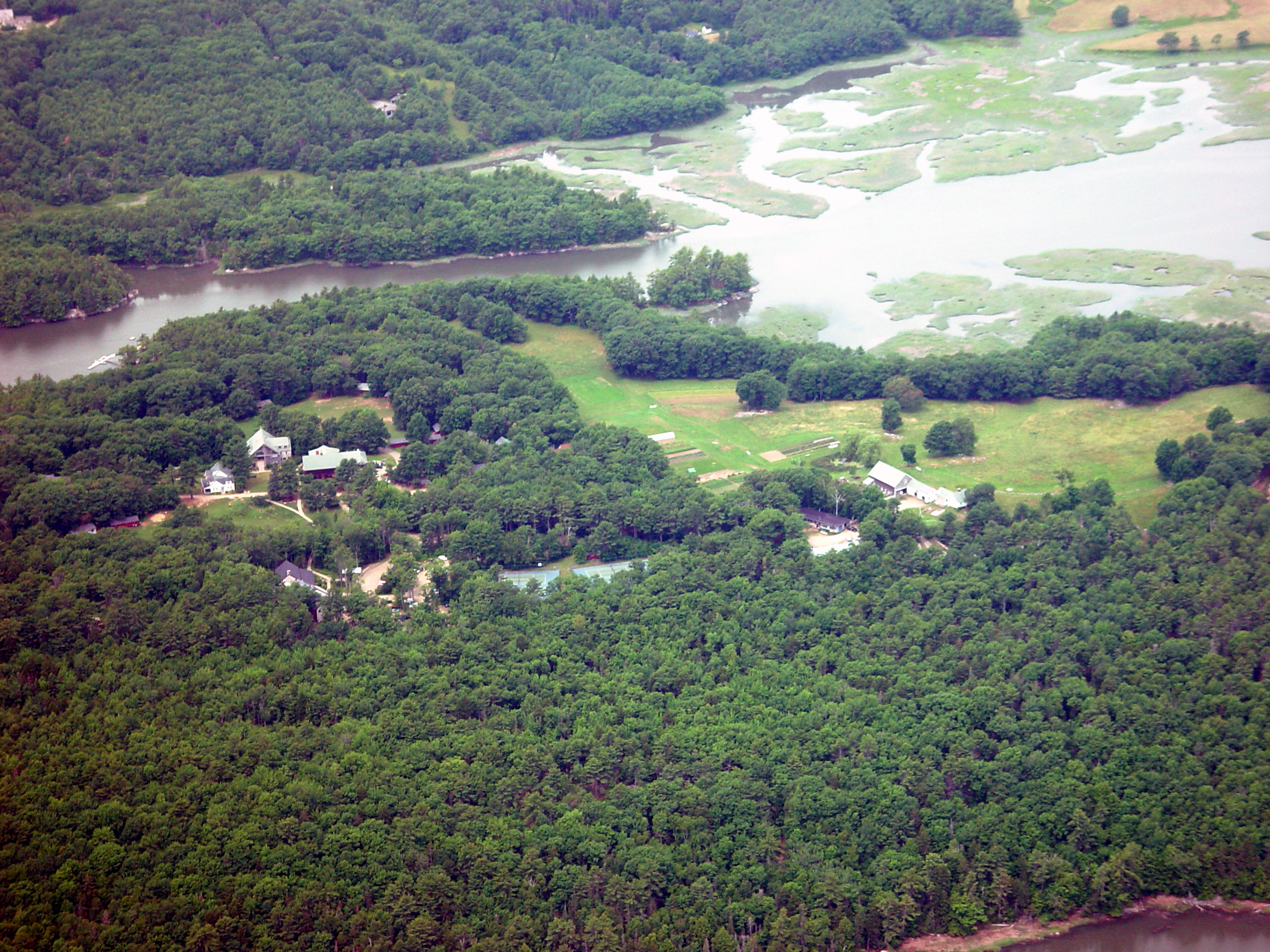
The main buildings of the Chewonki Foundation. The fields are part of the organic farm.

Founded in 1915 as a summer camp for boys, the Foundation now runs a four-month high school program—Maine Coast Semester at Chewonki, boys and girls summer camp programs, wilderness trips for teenagers and families, an organic farm, traveling natural history programs where non-releasable wildlife are brought to schools and libraries, as well as week-long environmental education programs for school groups around New England.

The Chewonki Foundation is located on a 400-acre (1.6 km^{2}) peninsula between Westport Island and the town of Woolwich. The peninsula protrudes into Montsweag Bay. The foundation is also a steward of the former Debsconeag Lake camps on Fourth Debsconeag Lake, and the owners of the public Big Eddy Campground off the Golden Road. With their off-site, program-specific properties, Chewonki took possession of several islands in Mid-Coast Maine to keep them available for public access.
