= South Twin Lake (Wisconsin) =

Lake in Taylor County, Wisconsin, US

- Location within Wisconsin Location within the United States
- Location: Taylor County, Wisconsin
- Coordinates: 45°16′23″N 090°26′14″W
- Basin countries: United States
- Surface area: 25 acres (10 ha)
- Max. depth: 40 ft (12 m)
- Surface elevation: 1,440 ft (440 m)

South Twin Lake is located in the Chequamegon-Nicolet National Forest in Taylor County, Wisconsin. It is the home of the White Birch regeneration project started by Janet and Carl J. Nelson to support an ecosystem in which white birch saplings can thrive. In 2008 they retired to Oregon.

Around the lake many "listening points" have been set up for enjoying the lake and the surrounding forest. The road to the lake crosses a glacial esker which is approximately 1/4 mile from the north end of the lake. The lake has a non-motorized status as per Molitor Township ordinance. Until 2008 Carl Nelson maintained a path along the eastern and southern shores of the lake, which passed several listening points and goes through the regeneration area. They still remain.

The lake is home to frogs, bluegill, bass, and deer.

In 2008 the control of the lake reverted to the control of the National Forest Service as per a pre-existing contract from 1978. The family cabin was removed in the spring of 2009 by family members.

A large US Forest Service authorized clear cut took place south of the lake in the winter of 2009 and continues in 2010.

According to USGS GNIS, there are at least three other lakes in Wisconsin with the same name.
