= South Twin Lake (Maine) =

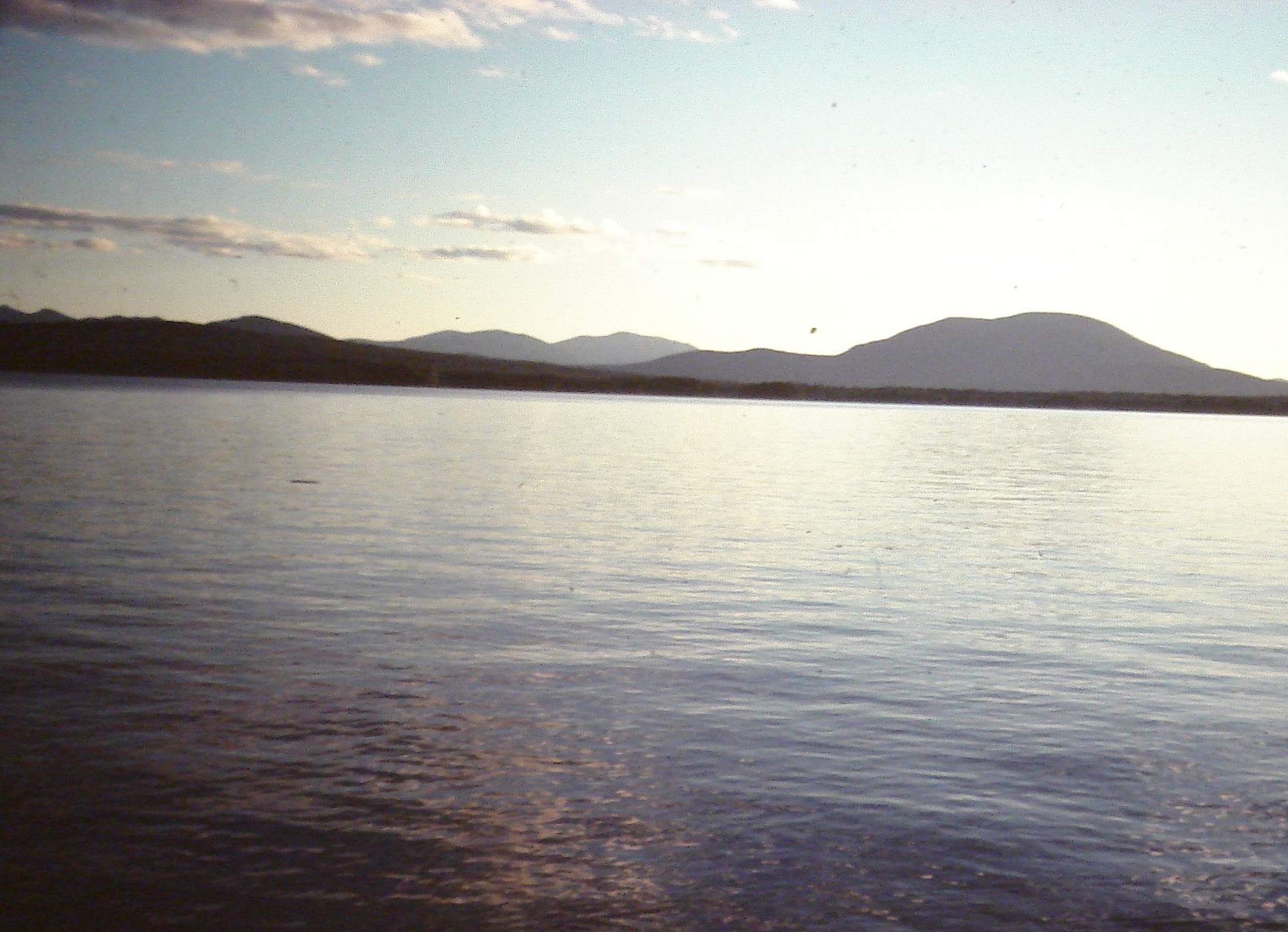
- Evening light, South Twin Lake

- Location within Maine Location within the United States
- Location: Penobscot County, Maine
- Coordinates: 45°37′N 68°51′W
- Type: Natural Lake
- Basin countries: United States
- Max. length: 4 miles (6 km)
- Max. width: 1.25 miles (2 km)
- Surface area: 3,200 acres (13 km^{2})
- Average depth: 30 feet (9 m)
- Max. depth: 55 feet (17 m)
- Shore length^{1}: 14 miles (20 km)
- Surface elevation: 492 feet (150 m)
- ^{1} Shore length is not a well-defined measure.

South Twin Lake having about 3,200 acres (13 km^{2}) is wholly within Penobscot County, Maine. It is about 6 miles (10 km) west of Millinocket, Maine and is part of the Pemadumcook Chain of Lakes. The lake is centered at 45°37.25′N 68°51′W and has spillway elevation 492 feet (150 m) above sea level. It is part of the watershed of the West Branch of the Penobscot River.

There is a State-sponsored boat access ramp in Partridge Cove off Maine State Route 11 at 45°35′57″N 68°49′15″W. Parallel to the east side of the lake is Route 11 and the tracks of the Montreal, Maine and Atlantic Railway. The north south extent of the lake is about 1.8 miles (3 km) at the east end due to the extent of Partridge Cove at the southeast corner of the lake and the same at the west end due to Lincoln Cove at the northwest end. The average width of the lake appears to be 1.25 miles (2 km) roughly north to south and about 4 miles (6 km) long in a WNW direction. A gravel-surfaced road called Turkey Tail services the south side camps and connects to Route 11 at Partridge Cove. The lake has several rocks which are navigation hazards and in the spring of the year, one should be on the lookout for drifting logs.

Ice has gone out as soon as April 13, but usually goes out around May 1. The lake is surrounded by second growth forests consisting of hemlock, red spruce, balsam fir and scattered white pines. The broad-leaf component of the forest is aspen, white and yellow birch, red oak, red and sugar maple, and black ash. Tributaries include Lincoln Brook at the northwest end, and east and west Ragged Brooks coming in from the south. Fish include yellow and white perch, atlantic salmon, brook trout, eels, chain pickerel, hornpout, whitefish, chubs. Henry David Thoreau passed this lake in the evening of Saturday, September 5, 1846 while paddling up North Twin Lake, but did not enter South Twin.

== Islands and Reefs ==
Larger islands include Len's Island (Isle of Len) (Private) near the south shore just east of Ragged Brook and Peanut Island, having some large boulders in the northeast part of the lake. There is a reef of rocks extending north from Peanut Island to the Rock Pile which is on the northern boundary of South Twin Lake.

== History ==
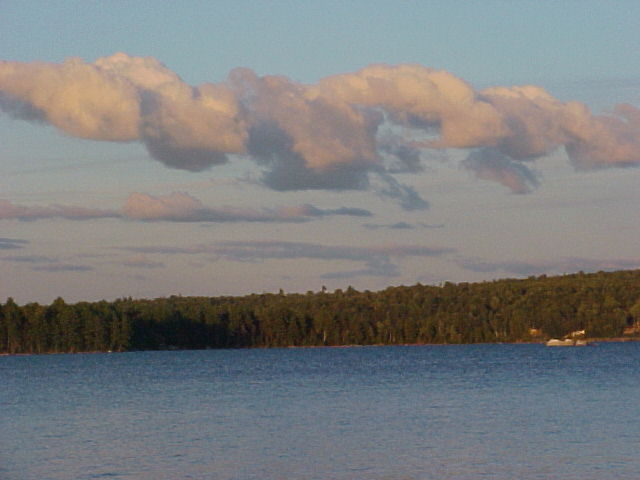
Eastward view South Twin Lake

The history is primarily that of the North Twin Dam. Thoreau mentions that there is an abundance of large white pine around South Twin. In 1836 and 1839, the Maine legislature passed acts whereby dams could be built at Chesuncook and North Twin Lake. Apparently the North Twin dam was not built in 1839 but by 1846 the dam had a 12-foot (3.7 m) head. This was raised to 16 feet (4.9 m) in 1867. The present dam was established by the Great Northern Paper Company in 1903–04 and was built by J.B. Mullen.

== Citations ==
- The Maine Woods by Henry David Thoreau
- The Penobscot Boom and the Development of the West Branch of the Penobscot River for Log Driving 1825–1931 by Alfred Geer Hempstead, Copyright 1975
