= Passadumkeag River =

River in Maine, United States

Passadumkeag River pαsítαmkik

Location
- Country: United States

Physical characteristics
- Source
  - location: Maine
  - elevation: 280 feet (85 m)
- Mouth
  - location: Penobscot River
  - coordinates: 45°11′06″N 68°37′01″W
  - elevation: 130 feet (40 m)
- Length: 48 mi (77 km)

Basin features
- Tributaries
  - left: Nicatous Stream

The Passadumkeag River (Penobscot: pαsítαmkik, "at the land beyond the gravel bar") is a river in Maine. From the confluence of its East Branch and West Branch (45°18′51″N 68°13′18″W) in Maine Township 3, Range 1, NBPP, the river runs 48.2 miles (77.6 km) south and west to its mouth on the Penobscot River in Passadumkeag.

East Branch Passadumkeag River

Physical characteristics
- Source
  - elevation: 282 feet (86 m)

== East Branch ==
From the outflow of Weir Pond (45°19′58″N 68°13′32″W) the stream runs 2.3 miles (3.7 km) south to its confluence with the West Branch.

West Branch Passadumkeag River

Physical characteristics
- Source
  - elevation: 299 feet (91 m)

== West Branch ==
From the outflow of Number 3 Pond (45°19′09″N 68°14′15″W) the stream runs 1.2 miles (1.9 km) southeast to its confluence with the East Branch.

== See also ==
- List of rivers of Maine
