= Pemadumcook Chain of Lakes =

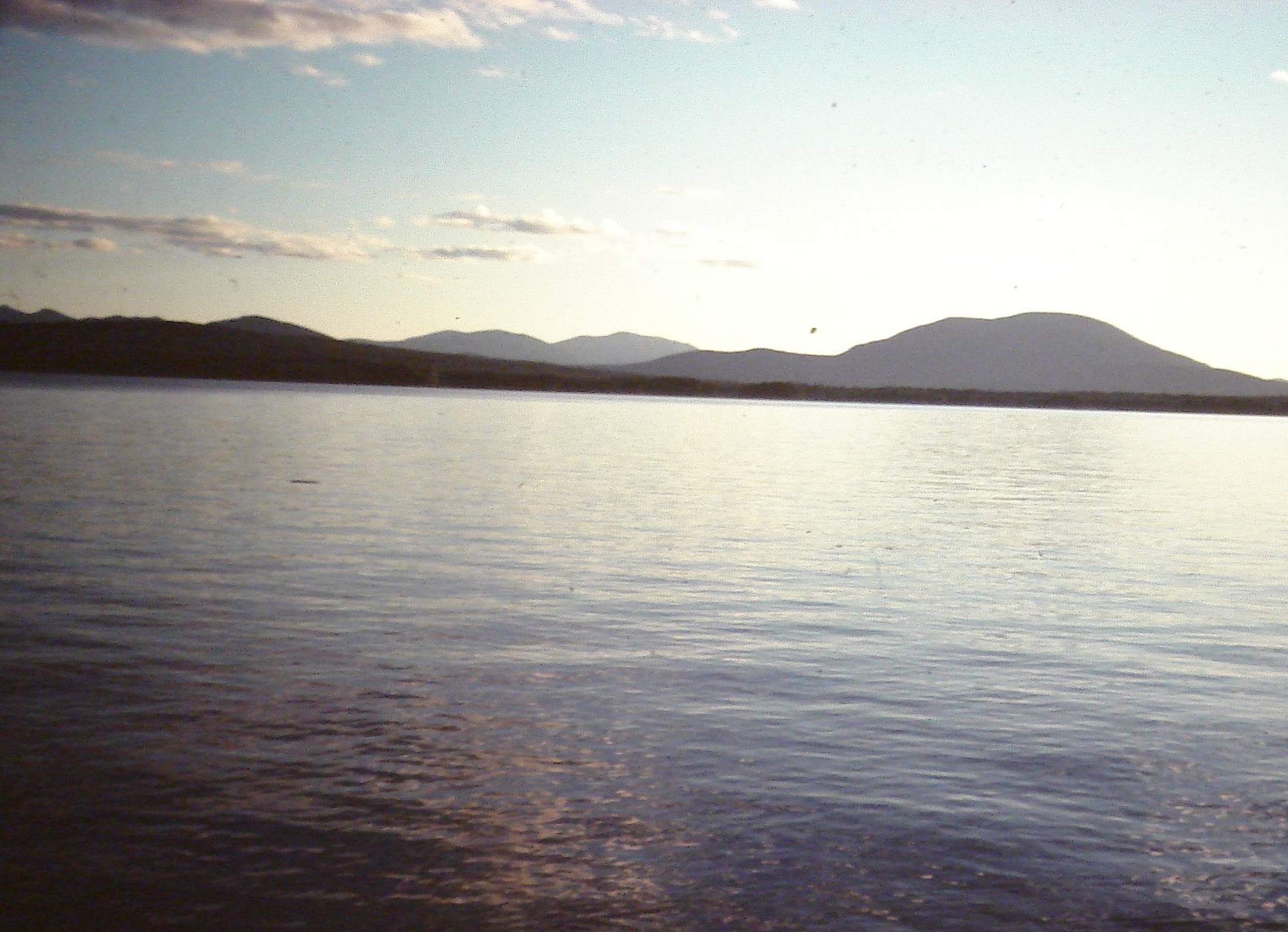
- Evening light, South Twin Lake

- Location within Maine Location within the United States
- Location: Penobscot County, Maine Piscataquis County, Maine
- Coordinates: 45°42′N 68°57′W
- Type: Natural lake
- Basin countries: United States
- Max. length: 14 miles (23 km)
- Max. width: 2.5 miles (4 km)
- Surface area: 18,300 acres (7,400 ha)
- Average depth: 35 feet (11 m)
- Max. depth: 103 feet (31 m)
- Shore length^{1}: 65 miles (100 km)
- Surface elevation: 492 feet (150 m)
- ^{1} Shore length is not a well-defined measure.

The Pemadumcook Chain of Lakes are a set of large lakes in north-central Maine in the United States.

== Name ==
Thoreau's Pamadumcook or Joseph Chadwick's Bennedumcook is rendered by the United States Geographical Board in an 1897 decision as "Pemadumcook Lake".

== Geography ==
The Pemadumcook chain of lakes forms the largest body of water in view as one gazes south from Mount Katahdin. If one takes a landscape picture from that summit, these lakes span the distance from the Piscataquis Mountains in the west to North Twin dam on Elbow Lake in the east. It is the fifth-largest lake system in Maine, exceeded only by Moosehead Lake at 74,890 acres (303 km^{2}), Sebago Lake at 28,771 acres (116 km^{2}), Chesuncook Lake at 23,070 acres (93 km^{2}), and Flagstaff Lake at 20,300 acres (82 km^{2}). The Pemadumcook Chain of Lakes occupy 18,300 acres (74 km^{2}). Individually Mooselookmeguntic Lake is larger than Pemadumcook, but it is not larger than the chain.

The series of lakes are named Ambajejus, Elbow, North Twin, Pemadumcook and South Twin Lake. The lakes are part of the West Branch of the Penobscot River. The West Branch enters the northwest corner of Ambajejus, and the current flows south through that lake. The channel passes Deep Cove on the east and Porus Islands to the west. The river channel then passes east through the east end of Pemadumcook into the head of North Twin Lake at Indian Point. The channel then follows a southeasterly course across North Twin Lake, staying between Perrow Point and Spring Island, and then veering eastward past Snake Point in sight of the settlement of Norcross. The channel then passes due east through the Elbow to North Twin dam. The length of the channel is about 11.5 miles (20 km). The combined length of the lake from the North Twin Dam, following the channel in reverse to the Porus Islands and thence to the northwest corner of Pemadumcook at Nahmakanta Stream, is nearly 14 miles (23 km). There is a large boulder in Nahmakanta Stream where the Appalachian Trail appears on the south bank of the stream. It is not prudent to take a motorboat west of the boulder.

The meaning of Pemadumcook in Penobscot is "lake with gravelly or sandy bottom or sand bars". The principal islands in the lake include the Porus Islands in Pemadumcook, Jo Mary Island on the south side of that lake and Moose Island and Gull Rock on the north side of the lake. The Porus islands, while principally in Pemadumcook, do divide Pemadumcook to the west and south from Ambajejus to the north. The islands separating North Twin Lake from South Twin Lake are all south of Spring Island. The channel between North and South Twin Lake between the western shore and these islands runs north and south and is called the Narrows. The islands in South Twin include the Rock Pile which marks the southwest corner of the archipelago of islands separating North and South Twin Lakes, Peanut Island, and the reef that runs between it and the Rock Pile to the north. There are a couple of islands in Partridge Cove at the southeast corner of the lake, and Oak Island and several other islands are on the south side of the lake at the mouth of Ragged Brook.

The deepest parts of the lake are 101 feet (31 m), about 0.5 miles (800 m) southwest of Moose Island in Pemadumcook, and 92 feet (28 m), just north of the ridge in Ambajejus Lake. There are numerous rocks in the lake, and the spring runoff brings many logs floating about. If the water is quite high one need not concern oneself about boulders in the middle of the lake. Exceptions include but are not restricted to a large reef at the west end of South Twin Lake that runs north and south and a large rock pile 1 mile (1.6 km) north-northwest of Partridge Cove which is usually marked. There are a couple of reefs in North Twin and a long reef about 600 feet (180 m) north of Indian Point Island. The Porus Islands and Deep Cove have plenty of boulders. There is a surprising rock pile about 0.5 miles (0.80 km) east of Jo Mary island.

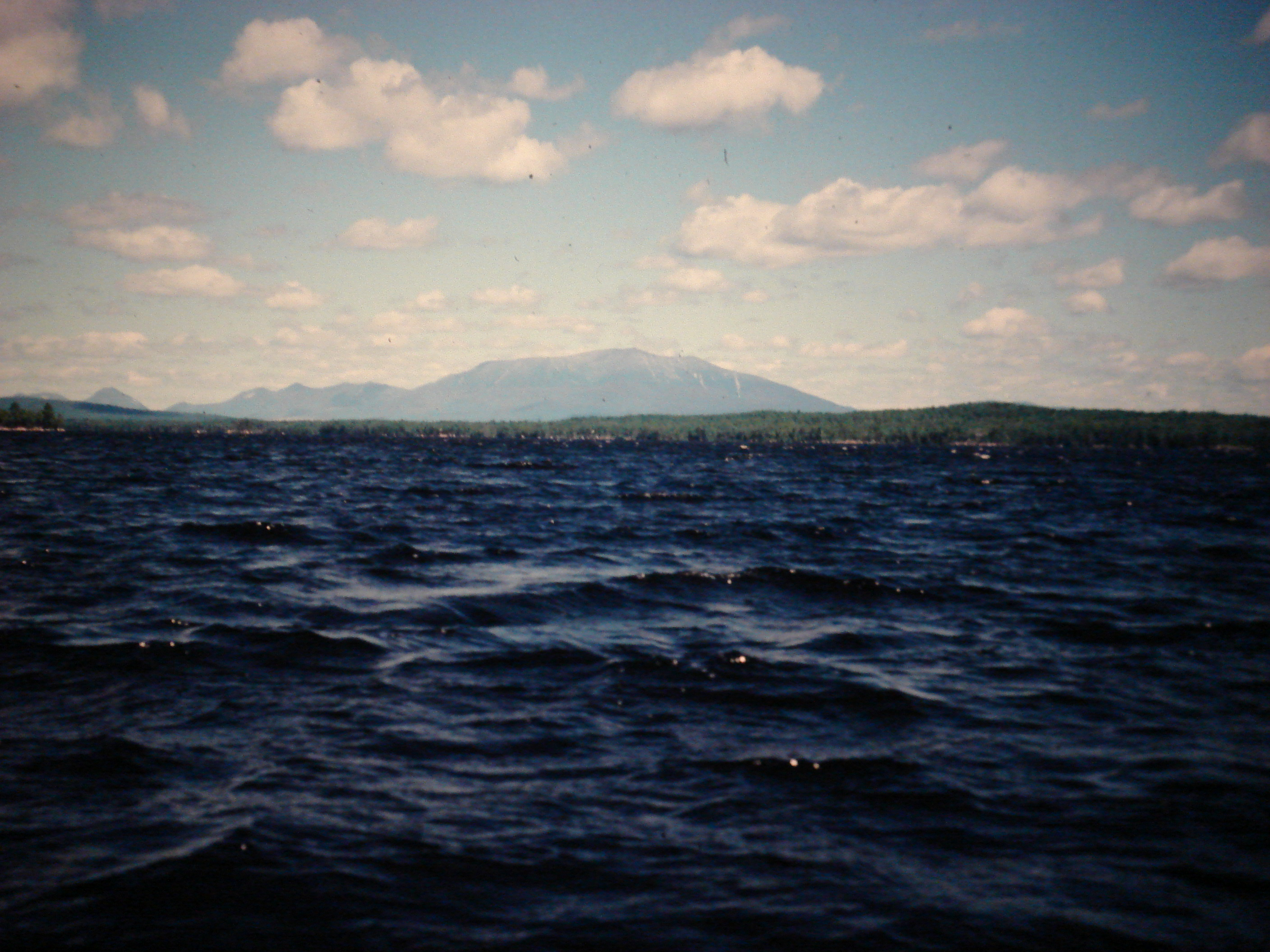
View up the Narrows into North Twin

== Watershed ==
The inlets to the lake are at Ragged Brook and Lincoln Brook on South Twin, the West Branch of the Penobscot at Ambajejus, Jo Mary Stream on the south side of Pemadumcook, and Nahmakanta Stream at the northwest corner of Pemadumcook. Twitchell Brook enters the lake near a point where the Appalachian Trail provides a view of the lake, but there is no inlet.

Road access to the lake is provided by Maine State Route 11 on the east side. This runs past Partridge Cove at the southeast corner of South Twin Lake and then serves the area up to Norcross. Millinocket is about 5 miles (8 km) east of Norcross on Maine Route 11. The paved portion of the Millinocket–Baxter State Park road gives access to Spencer Cove at the northeast end of Ambajejus Lake about 8 miles (13 km) from Millinocket. A dike at Spencer Cove created by the Great Northern Paper Company prevents water from flowing from Ambajejus Lake, spillway elevation 492 feet (150 m), into adjacent Millinocket Lake, elevation 478 feet (146 m).

To the north of the chain of lakes, but not contiguous with it, is Baxter State Park 209,000 acres (850 km^{2}), and to the west are the 43,000-acre (170 km^{2}) Nahmakanta Public lands. There is a state-sponsored boat access ramp in Partridge Cove off Route 11 at 45°35′57″N 68°49′15″W. Water clarity as indicated by the Secchi Disk: Range of 2007 Average Secchi Disk Transparency is 4.8 meters. The above indicates how far down one can see.

== Fish ==
Fish include Brook Trout, Togue Lake Trout, Atlantic Salmon (landlocked type), Whitefish, Chain Pickerel, American Eel, white perch, yellow perch, chubs, minnows, sunfishes, hornpout (Brown bullhead), large mouth bass (Micropterus salmoides) and small mouth bass (Micropterus dolomieu).

== History ==
An early document about this lake is the Large Crown Map from the 1764 Chadwick Survey by Joseph Chadwick, a surveyor for the British. Chadwick undertook a survey of the Penobscot River. The chain of lakes appears under the name "Bennedumcook" as a large lake in the Penobscot River above Quakish Lake.

Charles Turner Jr., on the view from Katahdin in 1804 describes it by writing, "and south of it (Chesuncook); a large lake N. of. The E. end of the Piscataquis Mountains."

Henry David Thoreau crossed the lake in September 1846, writing in The Maine Woods:

"After poling up half a mile of river, or thoroughfare we rowed a mile across the foot of Pamadumcook Lake, which is the name given on the map to this whole chain of lakes, as if there was but one, though they are, in each instance distinctly separated by a reach of the river, with its narrow and rocky channel and its rapids. This lake which is one of the largest, stretched northwest ten miles, to hills and mountains in the distance."

Theodore Winthrop, in Life in the Open Air (1856?) wrote:

"At noon we floated out upon Lake Pemadumcook, the largest bulge of the Penobscot, and irregular as the verb To Be. Lumbermen name it Bammydumcook : Iglesias insisted upon this as the proper reading; and as he was the responsible man of the party, I accepted it. Woods, woody hills, and woody mountains surround Bammydumcook. I have no doubt parts of it are pretty, and will be famous in good time; but we saw little. By the time we were fairly out in the lake and away from the sheltering shore, a black squall to windward, hiding all the West, warned us to fly, for birches swamp in squalls. We deemed that Birch, having brought us through handsomely, deserved a better fate : swamped it must not be. We plied paddle valiantly, and were almost safe behind an arm of the shore when the storm overtook us, and in a moment more, safe, with a canoe only half- full of Bammydumcook water. It is easy to speak in scoffing tone; but when that great roaring blackness sprang upon us, and the waves, showing their white teeth, snarled around, we were far from being in the mood to scoff. It is impossible to say too much of the charm of this gentle scenery, mingled with the charm of this adventurous sailing."

Charles E. Hamlin wrote in 1881 in Appalachia, the journal of the Appalachian Mountain Club:

"After a short run through rapid water in the river, the way lies through Quakish Lake, two miles; thence one mile through furious rapids, that require all the strength and skill of practised boatmen to ascend them by poling, to North Twin Dam; thence a mile more of river, or — as a reach of running stream connecting two lakes is here termed — of "thoroughfare," leads into North Twin Lake, four miles long, from which another of a few rods only opens into Pemadumcook Lake, largest of the chain and ten miles in length. About three miles of boating in this lake reaches a part of it called Deep Cove, two miles long and terminating in a passage into Ambejijis Lake, which is two miles long. It may be approached also by running on Pemadumcook about four miles, nearly to Gull Rock, opposite the outlet of Lower Joe Merry Lake; and thence by a channel, sometimes troublesomely shallow, two miles to the entrance into Ambejijis. Here on a point stands a log camp, dignified with the name of the Ambejijis House or Boom House, from the boom that stretches across the passage. This and a similar one at North Twin Dam, are the only roofs between the Head of Chesuncook and 'Old Fowler's,' a distance of more than sixty miles."
