= Westford Center Historic District =

Historic district in Massachusetts, United States

- U.S. National Register of Historic Places
- U.S. Historic district
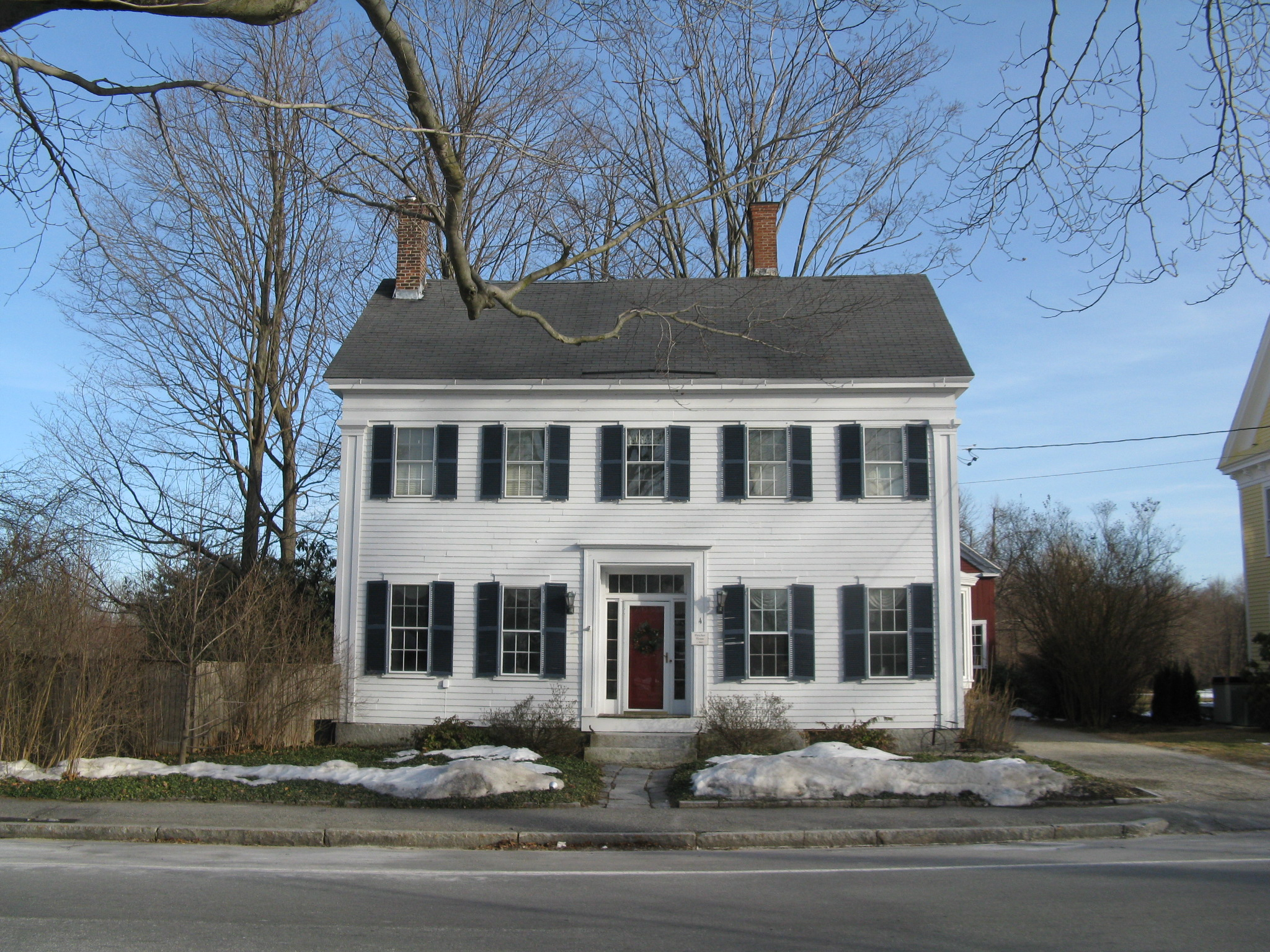
- Fletcher House, ca. 1843

- Location within Massachusetts Location within the United States
- Location: Westford, Massachusetts
- Coordinates: 42°34′50″N 71°26′19″W
- Built: 1713
- Architect: Badger, Carl V.; et al.
- Architectural style: Colonial, Federal, Greek Revival
- NRHP reference No.: 98001105
- Added to NRHP: August 28, 1998

Westford Center Historic District encompasses the historic village center of Westford, Massachusetts. It is centered on a stretch of Main Street between Graniteville and Leland Roads, extending away from this strip on a number of side streets. The area has been the town center since settlement of the town began in the 1720s. Prominent in the district are the Westford Academy building and the First Parish Church, two fine Federal style structures built in 1794, and the Italianate town hall, built in 1871.

The district was listed on the National Register of Historic Places in 1998.

== See also ==
- National Register of Historic Places listings in Middlesex County, Massachusetts
