= Musquacook Stream =

Physical characteristics
- Length: 25 mi (40 km)
- Discharge
  - location: Musquacook Deadwater

Basin features
- Progression: Allagash River
- River system: Saint John River
- Tributaries
  - right: Little Musquacook Stream; Robbins Brook

First Musquacook Lake
- Location within Maine
- Coordinates: 46°40′N 69°11′W
- Max. length: 3 mi (4.8 km)
- Surface area: 644 acres (261 ha)
- Max. depth: 48 feet (15 m)
- Water volume: 12,160 acre⋅ft (15,000,000 m^{3})
- Surface elevation: 1,066 ft (325 m)

Second Musquacook Lake
- Location within Maine
- Coordinates: 46°38′N 69°10′W
- Max. length: 3 mi (4.8 km)
- Surface area: 758 acres (307 ha)
- Max. depth: 62 feet (19 m)
- Water volume: 21,391 acre⋅ft (26,385,000 m^{3})
- Surface elevation: 1,066 ft (325 m)

Third Musquacook Lake
- Location within Maine
- Coordinates: 46°36′N 69°09′W
- Max. length: 1.4 mi (2.3 km)
- Surface area: 390 acres (160 ha)
- Max. depth: 64 feet (20 m)
- Water volume: 8,735 acre⋅ft (10,774,000 m^{3})
- Surface elevation: 1,096 ft (334 m)

Fourth Musquacook Lake
- Location within Maine
- Coordinates: 46°34′N 69°09′W
- Max. length: 3 mi (4.8 km)
- Surface area: 729 acres (295 ha)
- Max. depth: 40 feet (12 m)
- Water volume: 12,114 acre⋅ft (14,942,000 m^{3})
- Surface elevation: 1,119 ft (341 m)

Fifth Musquacook Lake
- Location within Maine
- Coordinates: 46°33′N 69°06′W
- Max. length: 2 mi (3.2 km)
- Surface area: 436 acres (176 ha)
- Max. depth: 5 feet (1.5 m)
- Water volume: 921 acre⋅ft (1,136,000 m^{3})
- Surface elevation: 1,135 ft (346 m)

Clear Lake
- Location within Maine
- Coordinates: 46°31′N 69°08′W
- Max. length: 1.8 mi (2.9 km)
- Max. width: 1.5 mi (2.4 km)
- Surface area: 626 acres (253 ha)
- Max. depth: 86 feet (26 m)
- Water volume: 16,205 acre⋅ft (19,989,000 m^{3})
- Surface elevation: 1,194 ft (364 m)

Musquacook Stream is a tributary to the Allagash River in the North Maine Woods. The stream originates in a chain of lakes in Maine range 11 townships 10, 11 and 12. The flow sequence is from Clear Lake through Fifth Musquacook Lake into Fourth Musquacook Lake in Piscataquis County; and from Fourth Musquacook Lake through Third Musquacook Lake, Second Musquacook Lake, and First Musquacook Lake into the Allagash River Musquacook Deadwater in Aroostook County.

== First Musquacook Lake ==
First Musquacook Lake is connected to Second Musquacook Lake by a short, broad thoroughfare which keeps both lakes at the same elevation. The first lake extends north from the thoroughfare to overflow into Musquacook Stream upstream of Horse Race Rapids. Searway Brook enters the east shore of the first lake. Summer dissolved oxygen concentrations are marginal below the 7 metres (23 ft) thermocline, but lake trout and brook trout reach the first lake through the thoroughfare during cool weather.

== Second Musquacook Lake ==
Second Musquacook Lake is the largest of the chain, and supports populations of lake trout and brook trout. Drainage from the third lake enters from the south while Squirrel Brook carries drainage from Squirrel Pond into the east end of the second lake, and Conner Brook and Hesse Brook enter the north end of the lake east of the thoroughfare which overflows to the first lake.

== Third Musquacook Lake ==
Third Musquacook Lake is the smallest of the chain. The third lake supports populations of lake trout and brook trout despite dissolved oxygen deficiencies below the late summer thermocline. Drainage from the fourth lake enters the west end of the Third Musquacook Lake from the south; and the northwest corner of the third lake overflows into the second lake 1.3 miles (2.1 km) to the north. Drainage from Long Pond enters the east end of the third lake, and Halfway Brook discharges into Musquacook Stream halfway between the second and third lakes.

== Fourth Musquacook Lake ==
Drainage from the fifth lake enters the east end of Fourth Musquacook Lake; and the northwest end of the fourth lake overflows into the third lake 1 mile (1.6 km) to the north. Hornpout and fallfish thrive in the fourth lake, and brook trout find refuge from warm summer temperatures where cool springs emerge into the lake.

== Fifth Musquacook Lake ==
Fifth Musquacook Lake is the shallowest of the chain. White sucker thrive in the lake. Clear Lake drains into the south end of the 5th lake, and the north end of the 5th lake overflows into the 4th lake 600 yards (0.55 km) to the west.

== Clear Lake ==
Clear Lake is the deepest lake of the chain and provides good habitat for lake trout, brook trout, and lake whitefish. The north end of Clear Lake overflows into Fifth Musquacook Lake 1 mile (1.6 km) to the north.
