= Little Seboeis River =

Location
- Country: United States

Physical characteristics
- Source
  - location: Maine
  - elevation: 600 feet (180 m)
- Mouth
  - location: Seboeis River
  - coordinates: 45°57′14″N 68°37′09″W
  - elevation: 370 feet (110 m)
- Length: 5.5 mi (8.9 km)

Basin features
- Progression: Seboeis River – East Branch Penobscot River – Penobscot River

The Little Seboeis River is a short stream in Maine Township 4, Range 7, WELS, Penobscot County, Maine. From its source (45°59′09″N 68°34′35″W), the river runs 5.5 miles (8.9 km) south and west to its confluence with the Seboeis River.

== See also ==
- List of rivers of Maine
