= Baskahegan Lake =

Lake in Washington County, Maine, United States

- Location within Maine Location within the United States
- Location: Washington County, Maine
- Coordinates: 45°30′25″N 67°49′48″W
- Basin countries: United States
- Surface area: 6,815 acres (2,758 ha)
- Surface elevation: 417 ft (127 m)
- Settlements: Topsfield, Maine

Baskahegan Lake is a body of water in Washington County, Maine, United States. The lake, which covers 6,815 acres (2,758 ha), is the third largest lake in Washington County and one of the largest statewide. It is located in the town of Topsfield, Maine, the former township of Brookton (North Washington, Maine). The picturesque lake is known for its warm water fishery and very high water quality.

In 2007, Evergreen Wind Power LLC sought to build on Stetson Mountain, which would be visible from the boat launch on Baskahegan Lake near Brookton, nine miles away. As of 2009, the installation on Stetson Mountain was the largest wind power operation in New England.
