= Metinic Island =

Island in Maine, United States

Coordinates: 43°53′0″N 69°7′30″W

Metinic Island is a 330 acres (130 ha) island in Knox County, Maine, United States, southeast of Port Clyde on the mainland and west of Matinicus Island. The island is part of the Plantation of Matinicus Isle.

Metinic Island is approximately 2 miles (3 km) long and is less than half a mile wide at its widest point. There are three very small islets just south and southeast of Metinic, called The Nubble, Hog Island, and Metinic Green Island.

Lobster fishermen operated off the coast of Metinic for generations; the island has also played host to sheep for many years. In 1994–95, the Fish and Wildlife Service acquired 149 acres (0.60 km^{2}) of the island to establish a haven for seabirds, hundreds of which nest on the island. While gulls are the primary nesters, a restoration project was initiated in 1998 to increase tern and Arctic tern nesting populations. The acquisition of the land was not without controversy, as a landowning family was removed from the island to establish the preserve.

== See also ==
- List of islands of Maine
