= Seboeis Lake =

- Location within Maine Location within the United States
- Location: Piscataquis County, Maine
- Coordinates: 45.4560611°N 68.8730841°W
- Lake type: Reservoir
- Primary outflows: West Branch Seboeis Stream
- Basin countries: United States
- Max. length: 6.7 mi (10.8 km)
- Max. width: 1.5 mi (2.4 km)
- Surface area: 4,913 acres (1,988 ha)
- Max. depth: 69 feet (21 m)
- Water volume: 76,905 acre⋅ft (94,861,000 m^{3})
- Surface elevation: 436 ft (133 m)

Seboeis Lake extends from Lake View Plantation, Maine, north into Maine township 4, range 9. The lake is enclosed by rocky headlands and sandy beaches and contains several pine-covered islands. The inlet at the north end receives several tributaries from Long A township including Dean Brook, Jordan Brook, and West Seboeis Stream. Bear Brook flows into the northwest corner of the lake, and Northwest Pond overflows into the west side of the Lake. West Branch Sebois Stream overflows the east side of the lake through Dudley Rips into Endless Lake; and Endless Lake overflow reaches the Piscataquis River 15 miles (24 km) downstream, just 3 miles (4.8 km) upstream of the Piscataquis and Penobscot River confluence at Howland.

== Fishing ==
A boat launching area on the inlet can be reached from a side road at West Seboeis on Maine State Route 11. The lake provides good habitat for white perch, chain pickerel, and smallmouth bass; and a few brook trout move into the lake from the tributaries. A dam at the outlet prevents anadromous fish migration into the lake.
