= Scopan Lake =

Lake in Maine

- Location within Maine Location within the United States
- Location: Aroostook County, Maine
- Coordinates: 46°30′29″N 68°13′32″W
- Primary outflows: Scopan Stream
- Basin countries: United States
- Max. length: 15 mi (24 km)
- Surface area: 4,986 acres (2,018 ha)
- Max. depth: 58 ft (18 m)
- Water volume: 110,286 acre⋅ft (136,036,000 m^{3})
- Surface elevation: 600 ft (180 m)

Scopan Lake is a V-shaped lake in northern Maine. The lake was known as Squa Pan Lake by early European settlers, but was renamed in 2011 to eliminate what Native Americans in the United States interpreted as a racial slur. The lake is mostly in Scopan township (formerly Squapan township), but the north end of the eastern arm of the "V" extends into Maine township 11, range 4; and the north end of the western arm extends into Masardis and Ashland. The lake discharges to Scopan Stream (formerly Squa Pan Stream) through a dam in Masardis. Scopan Stream flows into the Aroostook River 4 miles (6.4 km) downstream of the dam, and the Aroostook River is a tributary to the Saint John River. The Bangor and Aroostook Railroad crosses the northern tip of both arms of the lake.

== Recreation ==
The dam created the shallow western arm of the lake and increased the depth of the original lake forming the eastern arm. The lake is drawn down every winter to generate hydroelectric power. The dam prevents migration from downstream, but brook trout and rainbow smelt spawn in tributaries Nowland Brook, Bogan Brook, Aluson Brook, Dunn Brook, Cold Spring Brook, West Branch, and Scopan Inlet (formerly Squa Pan Inlet.) Boat launching facilities are available for public use at the dam and at the north end of the eastern arm 3 miles (4.8 km) south of Maine State Route 163. The eastern shore of the eastern arm is a 16,700-acre (6,800 ha) reserve of public land available for fishing, hunting, birding and camping.
