= Chemquasabamticook Lake =

Lake in Maine, United States

- Location within Maine Location within the United States
- Location: Piscataquis County, Maine
- Coordinates: 46°30′N 69°37′W
- Primary outflows: Chemquasabamticook Stream
- Basin countries: United States
- Max. length: 4.8 mi (7.7 km)
- Max. width: 1.5 mi (2.4 km)
- Surface area: 2,925 acres (1,184 ha)
- Max. depth: 105 feet (32 m)
- Water volume: 99,975 acre⋅ft (123,317,000 m^{3})
- Surface elevation: 1,201 ft (366 m)

Chemquasabamticook Lake (or Ross Lake) is the source of Chemquasabamticook Stream in the North Maine Woods. The lake is in Maine townships 9 and 10 of range 15, and township 9 of range 14. Tributaries include Sweeney Brook, Boucher Brook, Gannet Brook, Fool Brook, and Ross Inlet. Chemquasabamticook Stream flows 22 miles (35 km) from a disused dam at the north end of the lake to reach Long Lake on the Allagash River. Chemquasabamticook Lake has a self-sustaining native squaretail population, and rainbow smelt have been introduced to encourage more rapid growth of the native togue.
