= Allagash Lake =

Lake in Maine, United States

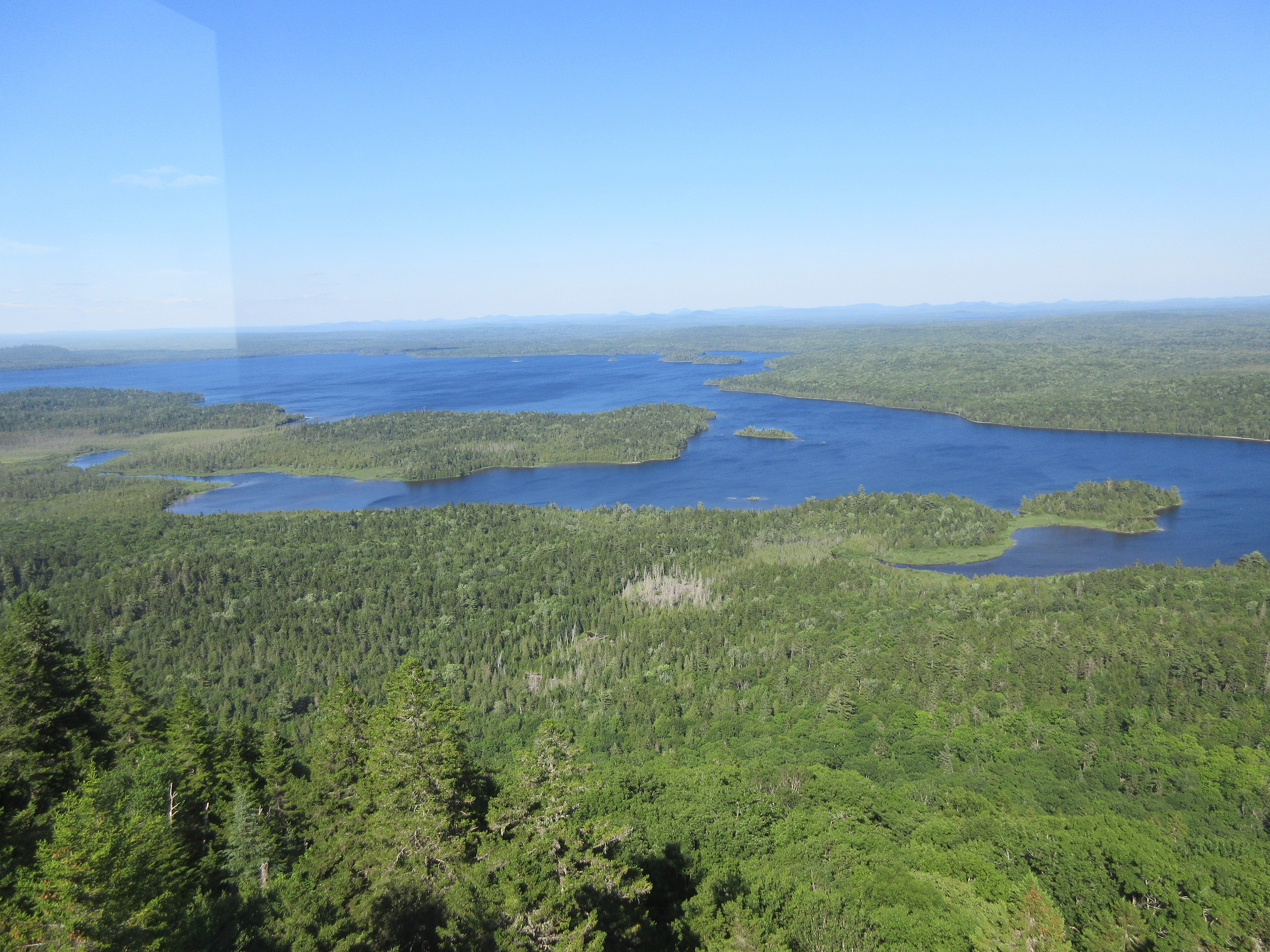
- Allagash Lake from the summit of Allagash Mountain

- Location within Maine
- Location: Piscataquis County, Maine
- Coordinates: 46°19′13″N 69°31′40″W
- Primary inflows: Allagash Stream
- Primary outflows: Allagash Stream
- Basin countries: United States
- Max. length: 4.4 mi (7.1 km)
- Max. width: 1.6 mi (2.6 km)
- Surface area: 4,260 acres (1,720 ha)
- Average depth: 35 feet (11 m)
- Max. depth: 89 feet (27 m)
- Water volume: 151,374 acre⋅ft (186,717,000 m^{3})
- Shore length^{1}: 23.8 miles (38.3 km)
- Surface elevation: 1,037 ft (316 m)
- ^{1} Shore length is not a well-defined measure.

Allagash Lake is in the North Maine Woods on the boundary of Maine range 14 townships 7 and 8 in the United States. Allagash Stream flows into the northwest corner of the lake from Allagash Pond, Crescent Pond, and Mud Pond in township 9 range 15. Allagash Stream overflows the northeast corner of the lake and flows 5 miles (8.0 km) through Little Round Pond into Chamberlain Lake. Chamberlain Lake originally overflowed through Eagle Lake and Churchill Lake to the Allagash River; but was diverted through Telos Cut to the Penobscot River in the 1850s. Allagash Lake provides good habitat for togue and squaretail.
