= Debsconeag Lakes =

Group of lakes in Piscataquis County, Maine, United States

First Debsconeag Lake
- Location within Maine
- Coordinates: 45°47′N 68°59′W
- Max. length: 2 mi (3.2 km)
- Surface area: 361 acres (146 ha)
- Max. depth: 140 feet (43 m)
- Water volume: 19,744 acre⋅ft (24,354,000 m^{3})
- Surface elevation: 502 ft (153 m)

Second Debsconeag Lake
- Location within Maine
- Coordinates: 45°47′N 69°02′W
- Max. length: 1.7 mi (2.7 km)
- Surface area: 172 acres (70 ha)
- Max. depth: 28 feet (8.5 m)
- Water volume: 2,733 acre⋅ft (3,371,000 m^{3})
- Surface elevation: 531 ft (162 m)

Third Debsconeag Lake
- Location within Maine
- Coordinates: 45°46′N 69°03′W
- Max. length: 2.5 mi (4.0 km)
- Max. width: 1 mi (1.6 km)
- Surface area: 970 acres (390 ha)
- Max. depth: 162 feet (49 m)
- Water volume: 57,736 acre⋅ft (71,216,000 m^{3})
- Surface elevation: 568 ft (173 m)

Fourth Debsconeag Lake
- Location within Maine
- Coordinates: 45°45′N 69°05′W
- Max. length: 1.2 mi (1.9 km)
- Surface area: 223 acres (90 ha)
- Max. depth: 150 feet (46 m)
- Water volume: 12,793 acre⋅ft (15,780,000 m^{3})
- Surface elevation: 630 ft (190 m)

Fifth Debsconeag Lake
- Location within Maine
- Coordinates: 45°46′N 69°06′W
- Max. length: 0.7 mi (1.1 km)
- Surface area: 87 acres (35 ha)
- Max. depth: 42 feet (13 m)
- Water volume: 988 acre⋅ft (1,219,000 m^{3})
- Surface elevation: 810 ft (250 m)

Sixth Debsconeag Lake
- Location within Maine
- Coordinates: 45°46′N 69°07′W
- Max. length: 0.3 mi (0.48 km)
- Surface area: 30 acres (12 ha)
- Max. depth: 26 feet (7.9 m)
- Water volume: 316 acre⋅ft (390,000 m^{3})
- Surface elevation: 971 ft (296 m)

The chain of Debsconeag Lakes in the North Maine Woods is a tributary to the West Branch Penobscot River. The flow sequence is from the Sixth Debsconeag Lake through the Fifth, Fourth, Third, Second, and First into the Debsconeag Deadwater on the West Branch.

== First Debsconeag Lake ==
The first lake is the second-largest of the chain, and holds more water than the combined total of the four smaller lakes. The west end of the first lake receives discharge from the upstream lakes of the Debsconeag chain, while the eastern end overflows into the Debsconeag Deadwater on the West Branch at about the same level as the first lake. The first lake supports a population of lake trout and land-locked Atlantic salmon.

== Second Debsconeag Lake ==
The second lake is the fourth-largest of the chain, but twice as large as the fifth lake. In addition to discharge from the upstream lakes of the Debsconeag chain, the west end of the second lake receives drainage from Big and Little Beaver Ponds, Big and Little Minister Ponds, and Moose Pond. The east end of the second lake overflows into the first lake 900 yards (820 m) to the east. The population of native brook trout fare poorly in competition with pumpkinseed and yellow perch.

== Third Debsconeag Lake ==
The third lake is larger than the combined total of all the other lakes in the chain. Drainage from the fourth lake enters the end of the western arm of the lake, while the northwestern arm of the lake overflows into the second lake 400 yards (370 m) to the north. This unusually clear lake supports a native population of brook trout and lake trout.

== Fourth Debsconeag Lake ==
The fourth lake is the third-largest of the chain, and holds more water than the combined total of the three smaller lakes. Drainage from the fifth lake enters the north side of the lake, while the east end of the lake overflows into the third lake 600 yards (550 m) to the east. This unusually clear lake supports a few brook trout, but is a more favorable habitat for lake trout.

== Fifth Debsconeag Lake ==
The fifth lake is the second-smallest of the chain. It is three times as large as the smallest sixth lake. Drainage from the upstream ponds enters the west end of the lake, while the east end of the lake overflows into the fourth lake 900 yards (820 m) to the southeast. The lake supports a population of native brook trout in competition with introduced yellow perch. Falls below the lake prevent upstream migration into the lake.

== Sixth Debsconeag Lake ==
The sixth lake (sometimes called the sixth pond) is the smallest of the chain. The lake supports a population of native brook trout. The east end of the lake overflows into the fifth lake.

== Debsconeag Ponds ==
The Eighth Debsconeag Pond at 45°47′N 69°08′W drains through the Seventh Debsconeag Pond at 45°46′N 69°07′W into the chain of lakes downstream of the sixth lake and upstream of the fifth lake. These ponds are much smaller than any of the six lakes.
