= Seboeis River =

Location
- Country: United States

Physical characteristics
- Source
  - location: Maine
  - elevation: 720 feet (220 m)
- Mouth
  - location: East Branch Penobscot River
  - coordinates: 45°56′07″N 68°38′20″W
  - elevation: 350 feet (110 m)
- Length: 28 mi (45 km)

Basin features
- Progression: East Branch Penobscot River – Penobscot River
- Tributaries
  - left: Little Seboeis River

The Seboeis River is a river in Penobscot County, Maine. The river is the outflow of Snowshoe Lake (46°14′41″N 68°37′03″W) in Maine Township 7, Range 7, WELS; Snowshoe Lake is fed via a short stream from Grand Lake Seboeis. The river runs 28.1 miles (45.2 km) south — through White Horse Lake, Seboeis Deadwater, Upper Seboeis River Gorge, and Gagnon Flat — to its confluence with the East Branch of the Penobscot River in T.3 R.7 WELS.

== Grand Lake Seboeis ==
Grand Lake Seboeis
- Location within Maine
- Location: Penobscot County, Maine
- Coordinates: 46°18′N 68°39′W
- Basin countries: United States
- Max. length: 6.3 mi (10.1 km)
- Surface area: 2,602 acres (1,053 ha)
- Max. depth: 33 feet (10 m)
- Water volume: 109,085 acre⋅ft (134,554,000 m^{3})
- Surface elevation: 728 ft (222 m)

Grand Lake Seboeis forms the headwaters of the Seboeis River and is the largest lake in the Seboeis River watershed. A central narrows separates the southern and northern basins of the lake located in Maine range 7 townships 7 and 8, respectively. The south end of the lake overflows into Snowshoe Lake. Tributaries to the lake include Batch Brook, Jones Brook, Dead Brook, Coombs Brook, and the Wadleigh Deadwater. Stocking has introduced smallmouth bass to the native chain pickerel population.

== See also ==
- List of rivers of Maine
