= Sebasticook Lake Fishweir Complex =

- U.S. National Register of Historic Places
- Location within Maine Location within the United States
- Nearest city: Newport, Maine
- Coordinates: 44°51′N 69°14′W
- Area: 1.8 acres (0.73 ha)
- NRHP reference No.: 94001245
- Added to NRHP: November 10, 1994

The Sebasticook Lake Fishweir Complex is a series of prehistoric fishing weir structures submerged in the waters of Sebasticook Lake in Newport, Maine. With radiocarbon dates as far back as 3000 BCE, it is one of the oldest structures of its type in North America, and the only one in eastern North America that has been directly dated. Its existence provides evidence of large-scale organization among Native Americans of the period in northeastern North America necessary to create structures of its complexity. The complex was listed on the National Register of Historic Places in 1994.

== Sebasticook Lake ==
Sebasticook Lake
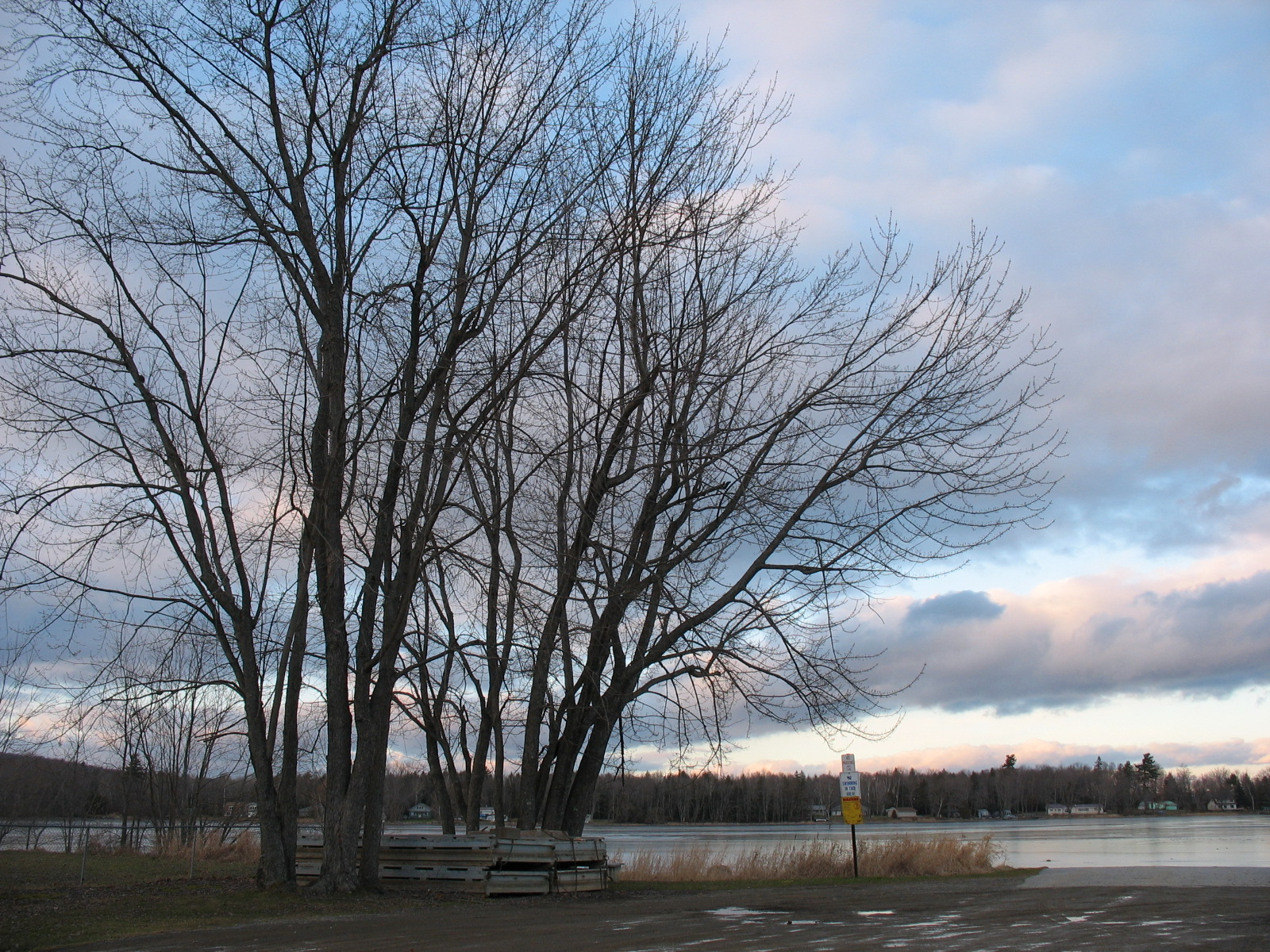

- Location within Maine
- Location: Penobscot County, Maine
- Coordinates: 44°51′N 69°14′W
- Primary outflows: Eastern Branch Sebasticook River
- Basin countries: United States
- Max. length: 5 mi (8.0 km)
- Max. width: 4.7 mi (7.6 km)
- Surface area: 4,537 acres (1,836 ha)
- Max. depth: 50 feet (15 m)
- Water volume: 89,666 acre⋅ft (110,601,000 m^{3})
- Surface elevation: 200 ft (61 m)

Sebasticook Lake is entirely within the town of Newport on the East Branch Sebasticook River 8 miles (13 km) upstream of the East Branch confluence with the Sebasticook River. It is the largest lake in the Sebasticook River watershed tributary of the Kennebec River. Stetson Stream flows 4 miles (6.4 km) into the east end of the lake from Pleasant Lake in Stetson. The East Branch Sebasticook River flows 12 miles (19 km) into the north end of the lake from Lake Wassookeag in Dexter. Smaller tributaries to the north end of the lake include Ring Brook and Harrison White Brook. The Dexter and Newport Railroad ran along the western shore of the lake and followed the East Branch Sebasticook River upstream through the towns of Corinna and Dexter. Nutrient-rich runoff from these communities caused eutrophication of the lake, with increased accumulation of bottom sediments from the annual die-off of aquatic vegetation. Fish species formerly present in the lake have been replaced by largemouth bass and crappie stocked by the Maine Department of Inland Fisheries and Wildlife.

== Description ==
The weir complex is located near the outlet of one of Sebasticook Lake's tributaries. Sebasticook Lake is a large body of water whose mouth has been dammed for some time; in the 1980s work was done to lower the mouth, and normal lowerings of the lake's water level after this change exposed the weirs to view. The weirs consist of a series of structures extending along what researching archaeologists believe to be historic positions of the tributary's main channel. The structures consist of wooden stakes, sharpened at the lower end by a stone axe, that were embedded in silt and organic material. The tops of the stakes, normally exposed to water when the lake is at a high level, and now exposed to air at lower levels, have been lost to natural processes and breakage by passing watercraft. These structures are subject to rapid erosion when the lake is at low water levels.

A second element of the weir structures are pedestals of organic material which are topped by stones. These structures were particularly sensitive to the raising and lowering of the lake's water level; several of them collapsed during the three-year period (1991–93) when the weir complex was examined.

In addition to the features of the weirs themselves, stone and wooden artifacts were found in the area. One interesting item found was a fragment of a birch bark container, radiocarbon dated to c. 200 BCE. Stone tools and projectile points have also been found by divers in the lake just beyond the modern mouth of the tributary.

== See also ==
- National Register of Historic Places listings in Penobscot County, Maine
- Boylston Street Fishweir
