= East Branch Penobscot River =

East Branch Penobscot River Wáhsehtəkʷ
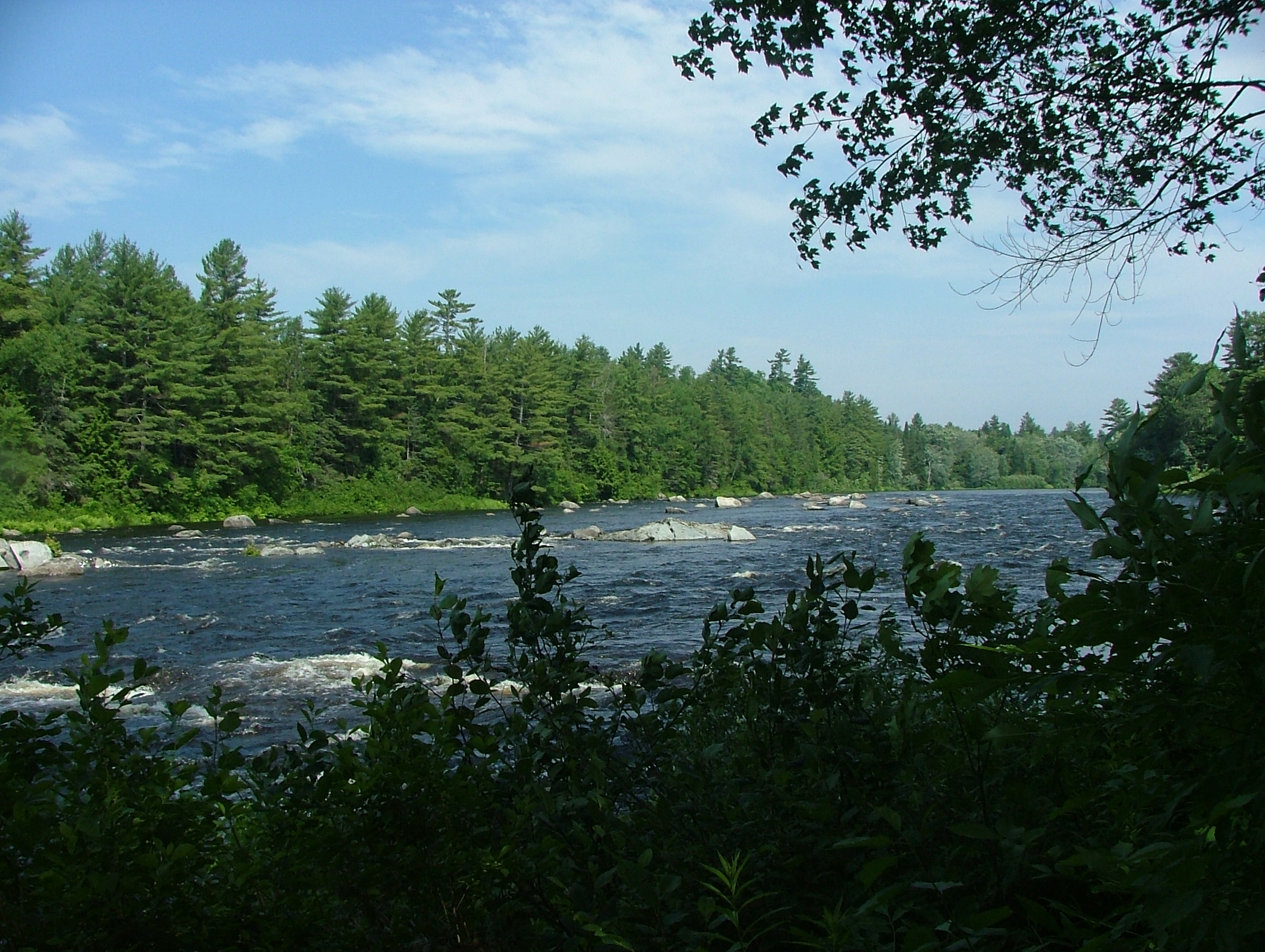
- East Branch Penobscot River, northeast of Millinocket, Maine.

- Location within Maine

Location
- Country: United States

Physical characteristics
- Source
  - location: Maine
  - elevation: 1,000 feet (300 m)
- Mouth
  - location: Penobscot River
  - coordinates: 45°36′32″N 68°32′02″W
  - elevation: 240 feet (70 m)
- Length: 75 miles (121 km)

Basin features
- Tributaries
  - left: Seboeis River

The East Branch Penobscot River (Eastern Abenaki: Wáhsehtəkʷ) is a 75.3-mile-long (121.2 km) tributary of Maine's Penobscot River. It flows in Piscataquis County and Penobscot County.

== Course ==
From its source (46°16′01″N 69°12′08″W) in Maine Township 7, Range 11, WELS, in Piscataquis County, the river runs 17 miles (27 km) southeast through the North Maine Woods to Grand Lake Matagamon reservoir, in the northeast corner of Baxter State Park. From Grand Lake Dam, the river runs 48 miles (77 km) south to its confluence with the West Branch Penobscot River in Medway, Penobscot County.

== Matagamon Lake ==
Grand Lake Matagamon
- Location within Maine
- Coordinates: 46°10′25″N 68°50′33″W
- Max. length: 8 mi (13 km)
- Surface area: 4,868 acres (1,970 ha)
- Max. depth: 95 feet (29 m)
- Water volume: 80,878 acre⋅ft (99,762,000 m^{3})
- Surface elevation: 653 ft (199 m)

Grand Lake Matagamon or Matagamon Lake is a reservoir on the East Branch, impounded by Grand Lake Dam. The dam was built at the outlet of First Lake, and flooded vast expanses of low-lying land extending upstream to include Second Lake.

The shallow water habitat created by the dam is more suitable for yellow perch, fallfish, and longnose sucker rather than for trout.

== See also ==
- Tributaries of the Penobscot River
- List of rivers of Maine
