= Millinocket Lake (Penobscot River) =

Lake in Maine, USA

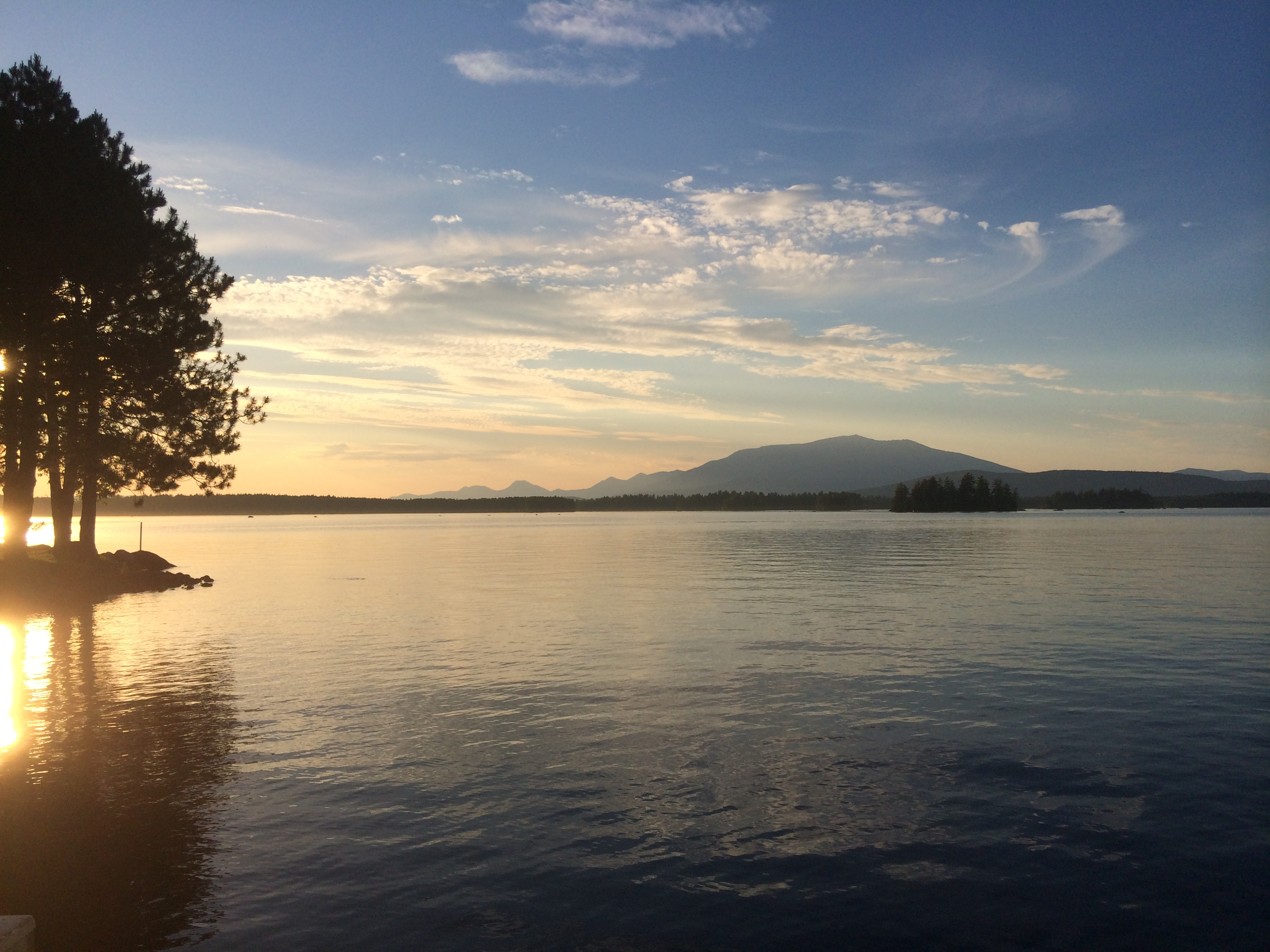
- Millinocket Lake with Mount Katahdin beyond.

- Location within Maine Location within the United States
- Coordinates: 45°45′33″N 68°47′36″W
- Max. length: 5 mi (8.0 km)
- Surface area: 8,571 acres (3,469 ha)
- Max. depth: 86 ft (26 m)
- Water volume: 179,982 acre⋅ft (222,005,000 m^{3})
- Surface elevation: 478 ft (146 m)

Millinocket Lake is 9 miles (14 km) northwest of Millinocket, Maine, United States, and is drained by Millinocket Stream, which flows through the town of Millinocket into the West Branch Penobscot River 2 miles (3.2 km) south of town. The lake is fed by Sandy Stream, which drains the southeastern slopes of Mount Katahdin by tributaries including Roaring Brook, Avalanche Brook, Spring Brook, Beaver Brook, and Rum Brook. Sandy Stream is a good spawning habitat for rainbow smelt, which are a primary prey for lake trout and land-locked Atlantic salmon living in the lake.

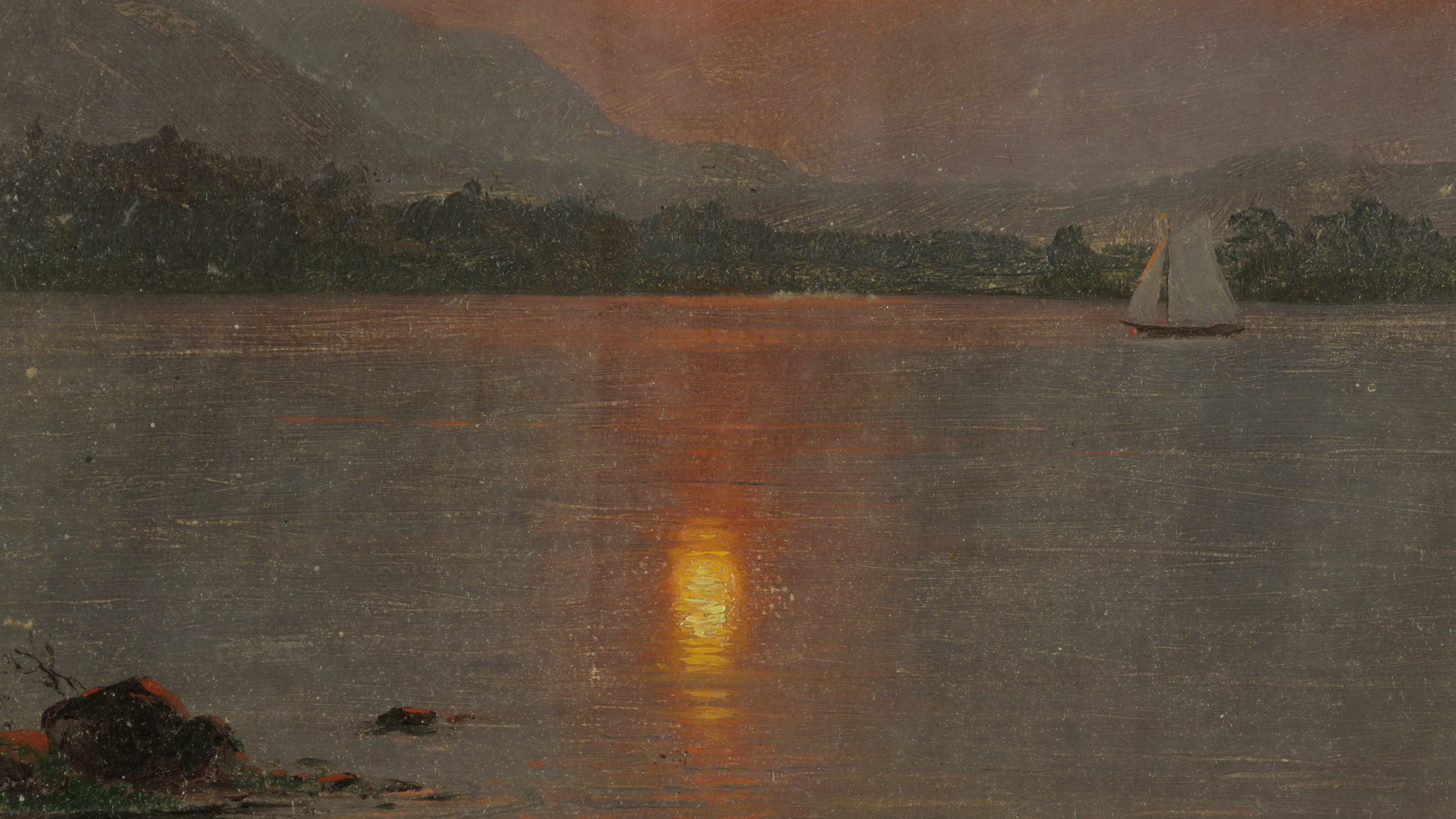
1870s painting of the lake
