= Chesuncook Lake =

Reservoir in Maine, United States

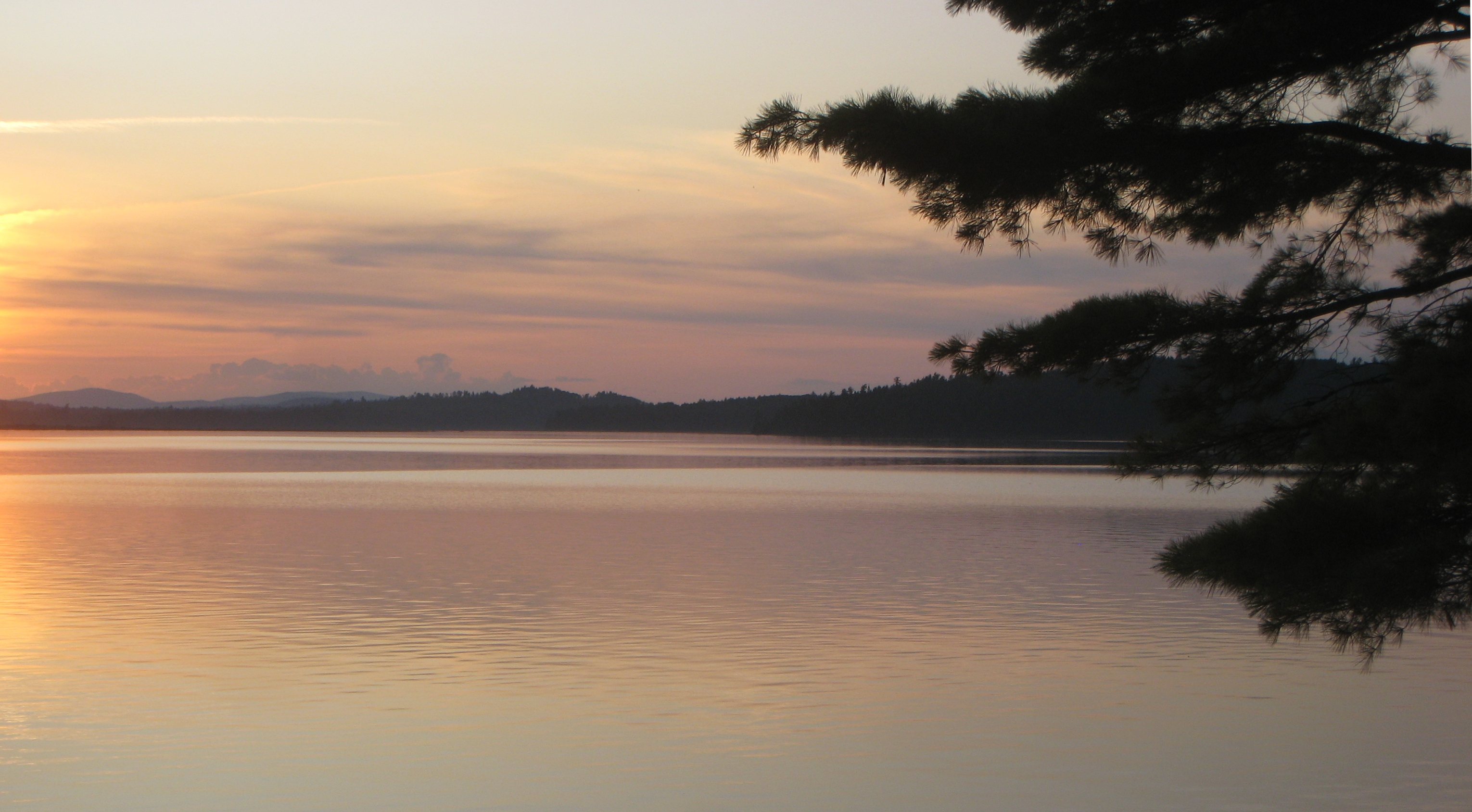

- Location within Maine Location within the United States
- Location: Piscataquis County, Maine
- Coordinates: 45°59′14″N 69°20′27″W
- Type: Mesotrophic
- Catchment area: 1,420 square miles (3,700 km^{2})
- Basin countries: United States
- Max. length: 22.5 miles (36.2 km)
- Max. width: 1–4 mi (1.6–6.4 km)
- Surface area: 25,183 acres (101.91 km^{2})
- Average depth: 40 feet (12 m)
- Max. depth: 150 feet (46 m)
- Water volume: 136,667 acre⋅ft (168,576,000 m^{3})
- Residence time: 6 months
- Surface elevation: 942 feet (287 m)
- Islands: Gero Island
- Settlements: Chesuncook Township, T2 R12 WELS, T3 R11 WELS, T3 R12 WELS

Chesuncook Lake is a reservoir in Piscataquis County, Maine, within the North Maine Woods. The lake was formed by the damming of the West Branch Penobscot River by dams built in 1835, 1903, and 1916 respectively. It is approximately 22 miles (35 km) long and 1–4 miles (1.6–6.4 km) wide, with a surface area of 25,183 acres (101.91 km^{2}) and a maximum depth of 150 feet (46 m). It is the third-largest body of fresh water in Maine. The lake is on the Northern Forest Canoe Trail.

== History ==
The lake was named "goose place" by combining the call of the Canada goose schunk with auke (the Abenaki word for place) to form Chesuncook. Henry David Thoreau visited Chesuncook (village) and lake in 1853 and wrote about its beginnings in his book The Maine Woods Chesuncook Part 4, "Ansell Smith's the oldest and principal clearing about this lake, ..." Thoreau observed no geese on the lake during his visit.

The original lake was enlarged by construction of Ripogenus Dam in 1916 to cover Ripogenus Lake, Caribou Lake, and Moose Pond. The enlarged lake became less suitable for lake trout because of fluctuating reservoir levels for generating hydroelectricity.

== Chesuncook Village ==
Chesuncook Village is a small settlement located on the northwestern shore of Chesuncook Lake with a year-round population of approximately 10 people on this otherwise uninhabited lake. It is in an unorganized township in the heart of the east coast's largest unsettled logging forest and is considered to be the last wilderness area on the eastern seaboard of the United States. It is approximately 60 miles from the nearest towns of Greenville and Millinocket, Maine. It is completely off grid with no infrastructure.

The only public land within the village is maintained by the state as a pasture and public boat launch/beach area. There is a non denominational meeting house which is used by seasonal churches, as a meeting place, and for foul weather refuge by those traveling through the area.

Chesuncook Village was settled in 1849 by Ansel A. Smith as a logging outfit.

The historic Chesuncook Lake House Inn, built in 1864 is still in operation 150 years later by its current owners the Surprenant family. Set on the shoreline of Chesuncook Lake and facing Mount Katahdin in the distance, the Lake House and its acreage are one of the few remaining North Woods "logging hotels" which at one time were built at intervals of every 14 miles (this was the average distance a man could walk in one day) through the logging regions in order to house and feed the logging industry as well as visiting travelers and sportsmen such as Henry David Thoreau.

The rest of the village, which is actually a 1920s subdivision that never really took off, supports a scattering of privately owned seasonal camps and a few permanent year-round residents.

In 2003, Chesuncook Village celebrated the 150 year anniversary of the original publication of Henry David Thoreau's book The Maine Woods.

== In fiction ==
In H.P. Lovecraft's horror short story The Thing on the Doorstep, the ill-fated Edward Derby found himself lost in the town of Chesuncook, "close to the wildest, deepest, and least explored forest belt in Maine."

Chesuncook Lake features in First Lensman by E. E. Smith as a clandestine handover point for a shipment of illegal drugs.
