= Seboomook Lake and Saint John Railroad =

Overview
- Locale: Maine
- Dates of operation: 1921–1929

Technical
- Track gauge: 4 ft 8 1/2 in (1,435 mm) standard gauge
- Length: 18 miles (29 km)

The Seboomook Lake and Saint John Railroad was a forest railway built to transfer pulpwood between drainage basins in the Maine North Woods. The railroad was built slowly in preparation for anticipated pulpwood harvesting, but onset of the Great Depression caused the railroad to be dismantled when harvesting plans were delayed.

== History ==
Spruce forests of the Maine North Woods were a source of pulpwood through the 20th century. Trees were bucked into 4-foot (1.22-meter) lengths and loaded onto sleds towed by draft animals or log haulers to the nearest river or lake. Log drives would float the pulpwood logs to a downstream paper mill when the snow and ice melted. Pulpwood growing in the upper Saint John River drainage was destined for Great Northern Paper Company's Millinocket mill on the West Branch Penobscot River. The problem was getting the pulpwood out of the north-flowing Saint John River into the east-flowing Penobscot River.

An 18-mile (29 km) rail route from Fifth Saint John Pond to the Penobscot River at Seboomook Lake was surveyed in 1910 after Great Northern Paper Company acquired forest lands along the Baker Branch Saint John River. Construction delayed by World War I began in the summer of 1919. Ten miles (16 km) of right of way were cleared that year and 60,000 logs were cut for railroad ties and telephone poles. Bridges were built in 1920 and two wharves were completed on Seboomook Lake for steamboats bringing supplies to the railroad. The first was at the railroad's South Terminal and the other was at the northern end of the ancient northwest carry from Moosehead Lake. A sawmill was built at South terminal that winter; and an engine house, offices, cook shacks, and living quarters for a 300-man construction crew were erected in the spring of 1921. The old 2 ft (610 mm) gauge Carry Pond and Carry Brook Railroad over northwest carry was rebuilt in 4 ft 8 1/2 in (1,435 mm) standard gauge to transfer railway equipment from Coburn Steamboat Company barges on Moosehead Lake to the Seboomook Lake barge Pittston launched on June 7, 1921. Barges initially delivered a narrow gauge work train of flatcars and dump cars. It was followed by a steam shovel, teams of horses, and a standard gauge Climax locomotive with fifteen railroad cars to carry eight to ten cords (29 to 36 m^{3}) of pulpwood each.

The Climax locomotive had been built in 1910 for the Conway Company of Conway, New Hampshire, and was delivered to Moosehead Lake by the Maine Central Railroad in July. New Baldwin 2-6-2 #1 arrived at Moosehead Lake about the same time. Climax #2 arrived at South Terminal on July 6, but Baldwin #1 was returned to the manufacturer. Twelve miles (19 km) of track were laid before construction was halted in the autumn of 1922. Telephone line was strung in 1923, but the Climax rested in the engine house until construction resumed in 1926. Construction was again halted when rails reached Fourth Saint John Pond as attention shifted to pulpwood delivery over the Eagle Lake and West Branch Railroad. No pulpwood trains ever ran to Seboomook Lake. The railroad was ultimately used by a Ford truck with flanged wheels to deliver supplies from the lake to logging camps through World War II, and rails were removed converting the right of way to a truck road after the war.
