= Baker Branch Saint John River =

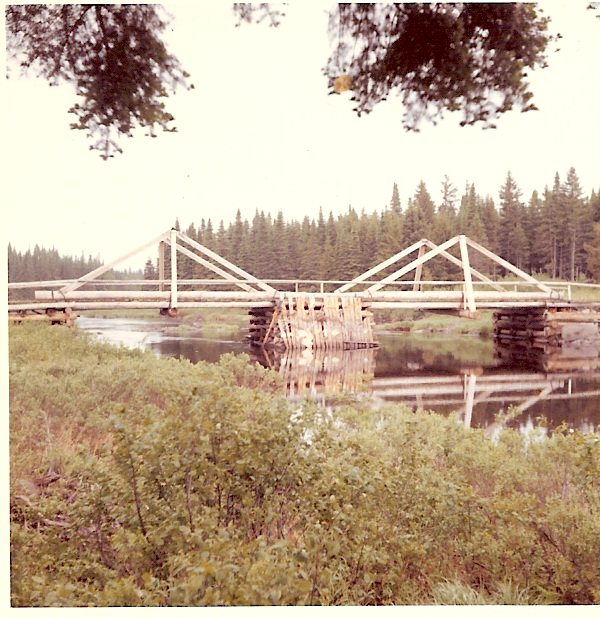
- International Paper Company Bridge at Baker Lake

- Location within Maine Location within the United States

Location
- Country: United States

Physical characteristics
- Source
  - location: Maine
- Mouth
  - location: SW Branch Saint John River
  - coordinates: 46°28′28″N 69°54′11″W
  - elevation: 1,100 feet (340 m)
- Length: 48.0 mi (77.2 km)

Basin features
- Progression: SW Branch – Saint John River
- Tributaries
  - left: Sweeney Brook, Brailey Brook
  - right: Span Brook, Beaver Brook, Lost Pond Brook, Higgins Brook, Spruce Brook, Gray Brook, Campbell Brook, Turner Brook

The Baker Branch Saint John River is a 48.0-mile-long (77.2 km) river. This river is a tributary of the Saint John River (Bay of Fundy), flowing in the Maine North Woods, in Maine, in the Northeastern United States.

== Hydrography ==
The Baker Stream originates in Upper First Saint John Pond (46°01′50″N 69°58′56″W) northeast of Truesdale Mountain in the northwest corner of Maine Township 4, Range 17, WELS. The stream flows sequentially through Lower First Saint John Pond, Second Saint John Pond, and Third Saint John Pond before entering T.5 R.17, WELS, to flow into Fourth Saint John Pond. The outflow of 4th St. John Pond (46°04′00″N 69°54′26″W), now the Baker Branch, flows into Fifth Saint John Pond on the boundary with T.6 R.17, WELS. In 1939, Fifth Saint John Pond was impounded in T.6 R.17 to form a diversion into the North Branch Penobscot River, but most flow follows the original channel north to Baker Lake at the confluence with Sweeney Brook in T.7 R.17, WELS. Turner Brook and Brailey Brook are tributary to the branch in T.8 R.17, WELS, before the Baker Branch's confluence with the Southwest Branch Saint John River in T.9 R.17, WELS.

== History ==
The Baker Branch drains a portion of the Maine North Woods utilized for 20th century pulpwood production. Spruce and Balsam Fir trees were bucked into 4-foot (1.2-meter) lengths beginning in 1917 and loaded onto sleds towed by draft animals or log haulers to the nearest river or lake. Log drives would float the pulpwood logs to a downstream paper mill when the snow and ice melted. A problem arose because pulpwood growing around the Saint John Ponds was destined for Great Northern Paper Company's Millinocket mill on the West Branch Penobscot River. The Seboomook Lake and Saint John Railroad was built in 1921 to carry pulpwood southerly from Fifth Saint John Pond to Seboomook Lake. The railroad followed the east bank of the Baker Branch between the 4th and 5th Saint John Ponds. The railroad was dismantled and converted to a truck road in the 1950s after the canal was constructed to convey floating pulpwood from Fifth Saint John Pond to the North Branch Penobscot River.

== Baker Lake ==
Baker Lake
- Location within Maine
- Location: Somerset County, Maine
- Coordinates: 46°16′N 69°55′W
- Basin countries: United States
- Max. length: 3 mi (4.8 km)
- Max. width: 1,300 yd (1.2 km)
- Surface area: 1,255 acres (508 ha)
- Max. depth: 33 feet (10 m)
- Water volume: 13,929 acre⋅ft (17,181,000 m^{3})
- Surface elevation: 1,181 ft (360 m)

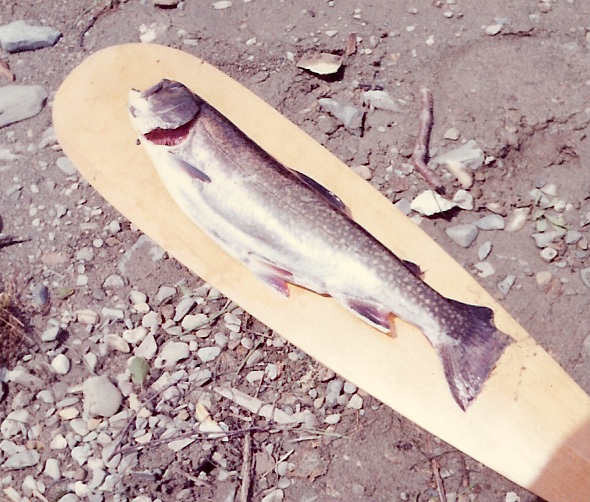
Canoe paddle with 18-inch (46 cm) brook trout caught at Baker Lake in 1959 prior to introduction of salmon and muskellunge.

Baker Lake is the largest lake on the Baker Branch. The lake was originally populated with brook trout, yellow perch, fallfish, and white sucker. The Maine Department of Inland Fisheries and Wildlife stocked the lake with land-locked Atlantic salmon in 1967, and then with rainbow smelt in 1970 as a food source for the salmon. Canadians introduced muskellunge into Lac Frontière in Quebec; and by 1986, muskellunge had entered Baker Lake by swimming down the Northwest Branch and up the Baker Branch.

== Lower course of the river ==
The mouth of the Baker Lake has a bridge on the road linking the summit of Mount Brailey (altitude: 451 metres (1,480 ft)) located on the west side and the summit of Mount Baker (elevation: 480 metres (1,570 ft) located on the east side. The "Baker Lake North Campsite" is located on the west side of the mouth.

From the mouth of Lac Baker, the "Baker Branch Saint John River" flows over 28.2 kilometres (17.5 mi) according to the following segments:

- 7.5 kilometres (4.7 mi) Northward through several rapids up to the confluence of the Turner creek (from the Southeast);
- 2.4 kilometres (1.5 mi) Northward forming a curve toward West, crossing the Township 8, Range 17 WELS, up to the confluence of the Brailey creek (from the West);
- 3.9 kilometres (2.4 mi) to the Northeast, up to the confluence of a stream (from the East);
- 1.6 kilometres (0.99 mi) Northward, up to an island;
- 2.9 kilometres (1.8 mi) to the Northwest bypassing an island (length: 2.3 kilometres (1.4 mi); maximum width: 0.7 kilometres (0.43 mi));
- 9.9 kilometres (6.2 mi) to the Northwest then the Northeast, crossing several rapids up to the confluence of the river in the T9 R17 WELS

The confluence of the "Baker Branch Saint John River" is in the Somerset County, Maine in Maine to:

- 9.9 kilometres (6.2 mi) East of the Canada-US border;
- 9.1 kilometres (5.7 mi) South of the confluence of the Southwest Branch Saint John River.

== See also ==
- List of rivers of Maine
