= Saint John Ponds =

Shallow lakes in Maine, United States

Upper First Saint John Pond
- Location within Maine
- Coordinates: 46°02′N 69°59′W
- Max. length: 600 yd (550 m)
- Surface area: 30 acres (12 ha)
- Max. depth: 7 feet (2.1 m)
- Water volume: 105 acre⋅ft (130,000 m^{3})
- Surface elevation: 1,831 ft (558 m)

Lower First Saint John Pond
- Location within Maine
- Coordinates: 46°02′N 69°59′W
- Max. length: 800 yd (730 m)
- Surface area: 26 acres (11 ha)
- Max. depth: 5 feet (1.5 m)
- Water volume: 44 acre⋅ft (54,000 m^{3})
- Surface elevation: 1,831 ft (558 m)

Second Saint John Pond
- Location within Maine
- Coordinates: 46°01′N 69°58′W
- Max. length: 0.9 mi (1.4 km)
- Surface area: 112 acres (45 ha)
- Max. depth: 5 feet (1.5 m)
- Water volume: 249 acre⋅ft (307,000 m^{3})
- Surface elevation: 1,811 ft (552 m)

Third Saint John Pond
- Location within Maine
- Coordinates: 46°02′N 69°57′W
- Max. length: 2.7 mi (4.3 km)
- Surface area: 221 acres (89 ha)
- Max. depth: 14 feet (4.3 m)
- Water volume: 2,025 acre⋅ft (2,498,000 m^{3})
- Surface elevation: 1,617 ft (493 m)

Fourth Saint John Pond
- Location within Maine
- Coordinates: 46°03′N 69°55′W
- Max. length: 1.1 mi (1.8 km)
- Surface area: 194 acres (79 ha)
- Max. depth: 22 feet (6.7 m)
- Water volume: 2,095 acre⋅ft (2,584,000 m^{3})
- Surface elevation: 1,460 ft (450 m)

Fifth Saint John Pond
- Location within Maine
- Coordinates: 46°08′N 69°54′W
- Max. length: 4 mi (6.4 km)
- Surface area: 680 acres (280 ha)
- Max. depth: 20 feet (6.1 m)
- Water volume: 9,622 acre⋅ft (11,869,000 m^{3})
- Surface elevation: 1,394 ft (425 m)

The Saint John Ponds are a chain of shallow lakes at the headwaters of the Baker Branch Saint John River in the North Maine Woods. The flow sequence is from the Upper First Saint John Pond, through the Lower First Saint John Pond, Second Saint John Pond, Third Saint John Pond, and Fourth Saint John Pond to the Fifth Saint John Pond. Flow from one pond to the next is sometimes called Baker Stream rather than the Baker Branch Saint John River. Great Northern Paper Company dug a canal from Fifth Saint John Pond 2 miles (3.2 km) westward to the North Branch Penobscot River in 1939, and built a dam at the north end of Fifth Saint John Pond so pulpwood logs harvested in the upper Saint John River watershed could be floated down the Penobscot River to Millinocket, Maine. The canal and dam have fallen into disrepair so most drainage from the ponds again flows down the Saint John River. All upstream ponds with the exception of the first had dams to regulate discharge flow for log driving, but those dams have similarly fallen into disrepair. Moose use the ponds as summer refuge from heat and biting insects.

== First Saint John Pond ==
The first pond is the smallest of the chain. The pond has an upper and lower basin connected by a narrow neck less than 200 yards (180 m) long. The upper basin is spring fed with a firm, rocky shoreline, while the lower basin is surrounded by boggy, organic mud. Beaver sometimes construct dams below one or both basins which may raise the water level by approximately 2 feet (61 cm). Native brook trout and yellow perch live in both basins, but during warmer summer weather trout favor the cooler water where springs emerge in the upper basin.

== Second Saint John Pond ==
The west end of the second pond is 800 yards (730 m) south of the overflow from the south end of the lower basin of the first pond. The east end of the second pond overflows into the third pond 1 mile (1.6 km) to the east. The second pond is the shallowest of the chain, and offers the least favorable habitat for brook trout. White sucker and yellow perch are well adapted to the muddy bottom of the second pond.

== Third Saint John Pond ==
The overflow stream from the second pond is augmented by drainage from 30-acre (12 ha) Robinson Pond before reaching the west side of the third pond. The east side of the third pond overflows to the fourth pond 2 miles (3.2 km) to the east. Fallfish, white sucker, and yellow perch thrive in the third pond; and brook trout retreat to areas fed by cool springs during warm summer weather.

== Fourth Saint John Pond ==
The overflow stream from the third pond is augmented by Austin Brook from 43-acre (17 ha) Austin Pond and by Summit Brook from 52-acre (21 ha) Summit Pond before reaching the south end of the fourth pond. The Seboomook Lake and Saint John Railroad followed Summit Brook from Summit Pond and along the east shore of the fourth pond from 1922 to 1946. The north end of the fourth pond overflows to the fifth pond 3 miles (4.8 km) to the north. The fourth pond is the deepest of the chain. Fallfish, white sucker, and yellow perch dominate the fourth pond, but brook trout do well in the tributaries.

== Fifth Saint John Pond ==
The fifth pond is the largest of the chain. The water level dropped 10 feet (3.0 m) when the dam was abandoned, and the formerly flooded area south of the original pond is boggy. The boggy area receives flow from Beaver Brook and Span Brook in addition to overflow from the fourth pond. The fifth pond has hornpout in addition to the species in the upstream ponds.
