= Pittston Farm =

- U.S. National Register of Historic Places
- U.S. Historic district
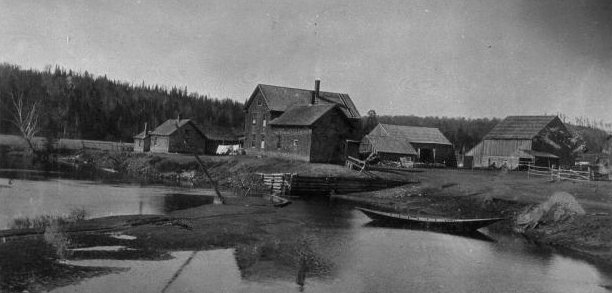
- An early 20th-century photo of the farm

- Location within Maine Location within the United States
- Location: West End of Seboomook Lake, at Confluence with the S. Branch of Penobscot R., Pittston Academy Grant, Maine
- Coordinates: 45.89373°N 69.96437°W
- Area: 60 acres (24 ha)
- Built: 1907
- Architectural style: Late Victorian
- NRHP reference No.: 00000762
- Added to NRHP: July 10, 2000

Pittston Farm is a historic farm and community complex in a remote part of northern Somerset County, Maine. Located down logging roads about 20 miles (32 km) north of the village of Rockwood, the farm was developed c. 1910 by the Great Northern Paper Company to provide food and other resources to workers on logging drives in Maine's northern forests. It is believed to be the best preserved of the few such facilities established, and was listed on the National Register of Historic Places in 2000. Its surviving buildings are currently operated as a tourist establishment.

== Description and history ==
Pittston Farm is set on the western end of Seboomook Lake, just south of the point where the North Branch Penobscot River drains into the lake. It occupies a 60-acre (24 ha) parcel of land set in a bend of the river. The nearest community of any size is the unincorporated village of Rockwood, located on Moosehead Lake about 20 miles (32 km) to the south on logging roads.

The farm property includes seven buildings that were built between 1908 and 1915 by the Great Northern Paper Company, which purchased the entire Pittston Academy Grant township in 1906. The farm, established on land cleared for farming late in the 19th century, was intended to supply loggers and their support animals with food and supplies, as well as accommodations, medical facilities, and recreational opportunities. It was one of twelve such facilities established by the company.

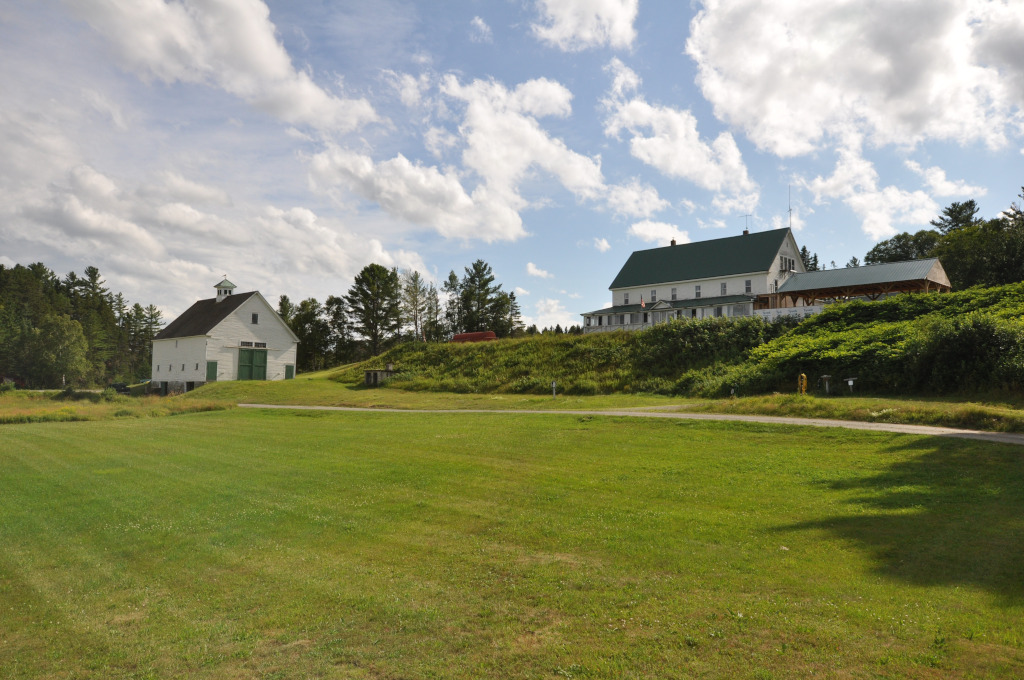
The boarding house and one of the barns

The principal residential building in the complex is the boarding house, built in 1907. It is a large 2 1/2-story frame structure, with a front-facing gable roof and a porch that wraps around to the side. This building originally housed a large dining room, kitchen, and sitting room on the first floor, bedrooms on the second, and a hospital space on the third. To the left of the boarding house is a wide single-story carriage barn, with seven bays for carriages that have since been adapted for housing. To its left is the two-story blacksmith's shop, which retains original forge equipment. These two structures were built in 1908.

The other main buildings on the property are a two-story office and three barns, one of which was built in 1908, the rest following in 1911. A metal-sided service building was erected on the property in 1955, replacing one destroyed by fire, and there are a collection of cottages, built at various times after 1948 that are set a short way from the main complex.

The property was managed as a farm by the Great Northern Paper Company until 1971, by which time logging drives were in decline, and it was more cost-effective to truck supplies in. Logging drives came to an end in 1971, when the company ended all support operations at the farm. From 1973 to 1991 the property was used by the Boy Scouts of America as a summer camp, and a number of its buildings succumbed to fire and the elements. In 1992 it was sold to owners who rehabilitated the property for use as a tourism facility. It has since been resold to Guy and Jenn Mills and family, who are operating it as a hotel, restaurant, and campground.

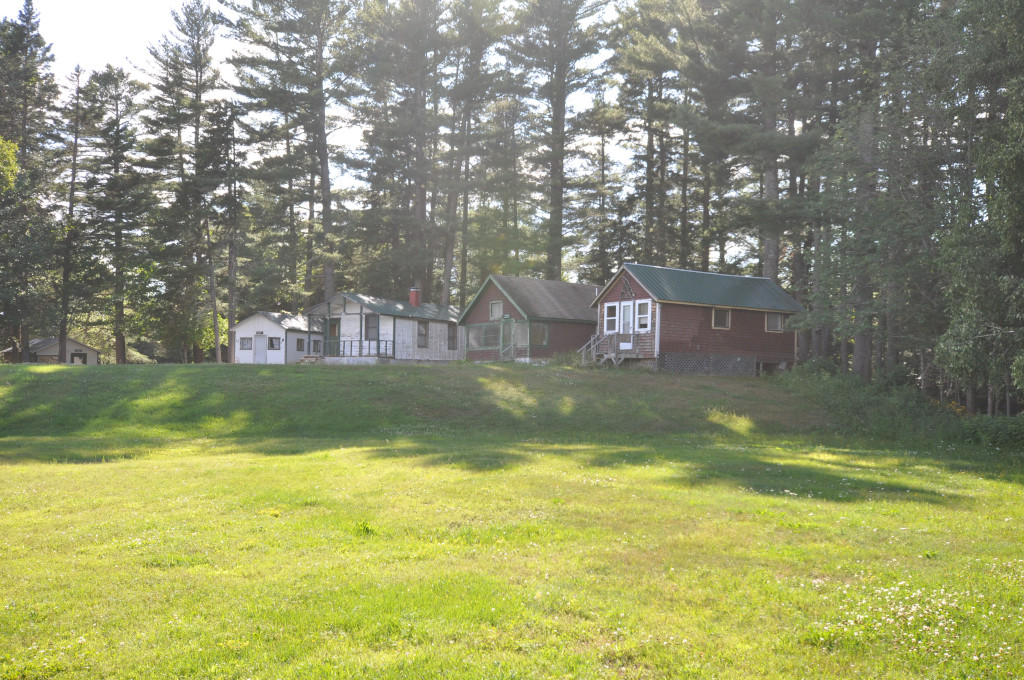
Historic cabins on the property

== Climate ==
Climate data for Pittston Farm, Maine, 1991–2020 normals, extremes 1989–present: 1100ft (335m)
Month	Jan	Feb	Mar	Apr	May	Jun	Jul	Aug	Sep	Oct	Nov	Dec	Year
Record high °F (°C)	59 (15)	63 (17)	75 (24)	84 (29)	92 (33)	94 (34)	93 (34)	93 (34)	93 (34)	83 (28)	75 (24)	62 (17)	94 (34)
Mean maximum °F (°C)	43.4 (6.3)	45.1 (7.3)	53.1 (11.7)	69.0 (20.6)	81.1 (27.3)	87.0 (30.6)	87.7 (30.9)	86.5 (30.3)	82.1 (27.8)	72.5 (22.5)	59.9 (15.5)	47.6 (8.7)	90.1 (32.3)
Mean daily maximum °F (°C)	20.7 (−6.3)	24.1 (−4.4)	34.0 (1.1)	46.8 (8.2)	62.0 (16.7)	71.4 (21.9)	76.4 (24.7)	75.1 (23.9)	67.4 (19.7)	52.7 (11.5)	39.0 (3.9)	27.3 (−2.6)	49.7 (9.9)
Daily mean °F (°C)	10.2 (−12.1)	11.7 (−11.3)	22.2 (−5.4)	36.4 (2.4)	49.9 (9.9)	59.5 (15.3)	64.7 (18.2)	62.9 (17.2)	54.9 (12.7)	42.7 (5.9)	31.1 (−0.5)	18.9 (−7.3)	38.8 (3.8)
Mean daily minimum °F (°C)	−0.3 (−17.9)	−0.7 (−18.2)	10.4 (−12.0)	26.0 (−3.3)	37.8 (3.2)	47.6 (8.7)	53.1 (11.7)	50.6 (10.3)	42.4 (5.8)	32.7 (0.4)	23.1 (−4.9)	10.4 (−12.0)	27.8 (−2.3)
Mean minimum °F (°C)	−23.4 (−30.8)	−21.8 (−29.9)	−14.8 (−26.0)	11.3 (−11.5)	25.3 (−3.7)	34.2 (1.2)	42.0 (5.6)	38.5 (3.6)	28.2 (−2.1)	19.3 (−7.1)	4.3 (−15.4)	−13.8 (−25.4)	−26.5 (−32.5)
Record low °F (°C)	−43 (−42)	−38 (−39)	−35 (−37)	−9 (−23)	13 (−11)	27 (−3)	35 (2)	33 (1)	21 (−6)	13 (−11)	−16 (−27)	−34 (−37)	−43 (−42)
Average precipitation inches (mm)	2.77 (70)	2.58 (66)	2.65 (67)	3.51 (89)	3.67 (93)	5.24 (133)	5.31 (135)	4.20 (107)	3.76 (96)	4.62 (117)	3.41 (87)	3.53 (90)	45.25 (1,150)
Average snowfall inches (cm)	19.0 (48)	22.3 (57)	20.2 (51)	6.1 (15)	0.2 (0.51)	0.0 (0.0)	0.0 (0.0)	0.0 (0.0)	0.0 (0.0)	2.3 (5.8)	6.7 (17)	27.1 (69)	103.9 (263.31)
Average precipitation days (≥ 0.01 in)	13.0	11.7	12.4	10.8	14.3	14.8	15.3	13.6	11.9	13.8	13.2	15.3	160.1
Average snowy days (≥ 0.1 in)	9.6	8.8	7.7	2.4	0.1	0.0	0.0	0.0	0.0	1.0	3.9	10.6	44.1
Source 1: NOAA
Source 2: XMACIS2 (records & monthly max/mins)

== See also ==
- National Register of Historic Places listings in Somerset County, Maine
