= WHPF =

- Pittston Farm, Maine; United States
- Frequency: 88.1 MHz

Ownership
- Owner: Light of Life Ministries, Inc.

History
- First air date: 2010
- Last air date: September 11, 2017

Technical information
- Facility ID: 174269
- Class: A
- ERP: 250 watts
- HAAT: −73.0 meters (−239.5 ft)
- Transmitter coordinates: 45°53′38″N 69°57′54″W

WHPF (88.1 FM) was a radio station licensed to Pittston Farm, Maine, United States. The station was owned by Light of Life Ministries, Inc.

On August 30, 2017, Light of Life Ministries requested cancellation of the license. The Federal Communications Commission cancelled the license on September 11, 2017.
