= St. Zacharie Border Crossing =

Crossing on the Canada–US border

St. Zacharie Maine – St. Zacharie Quebec Border Crossing
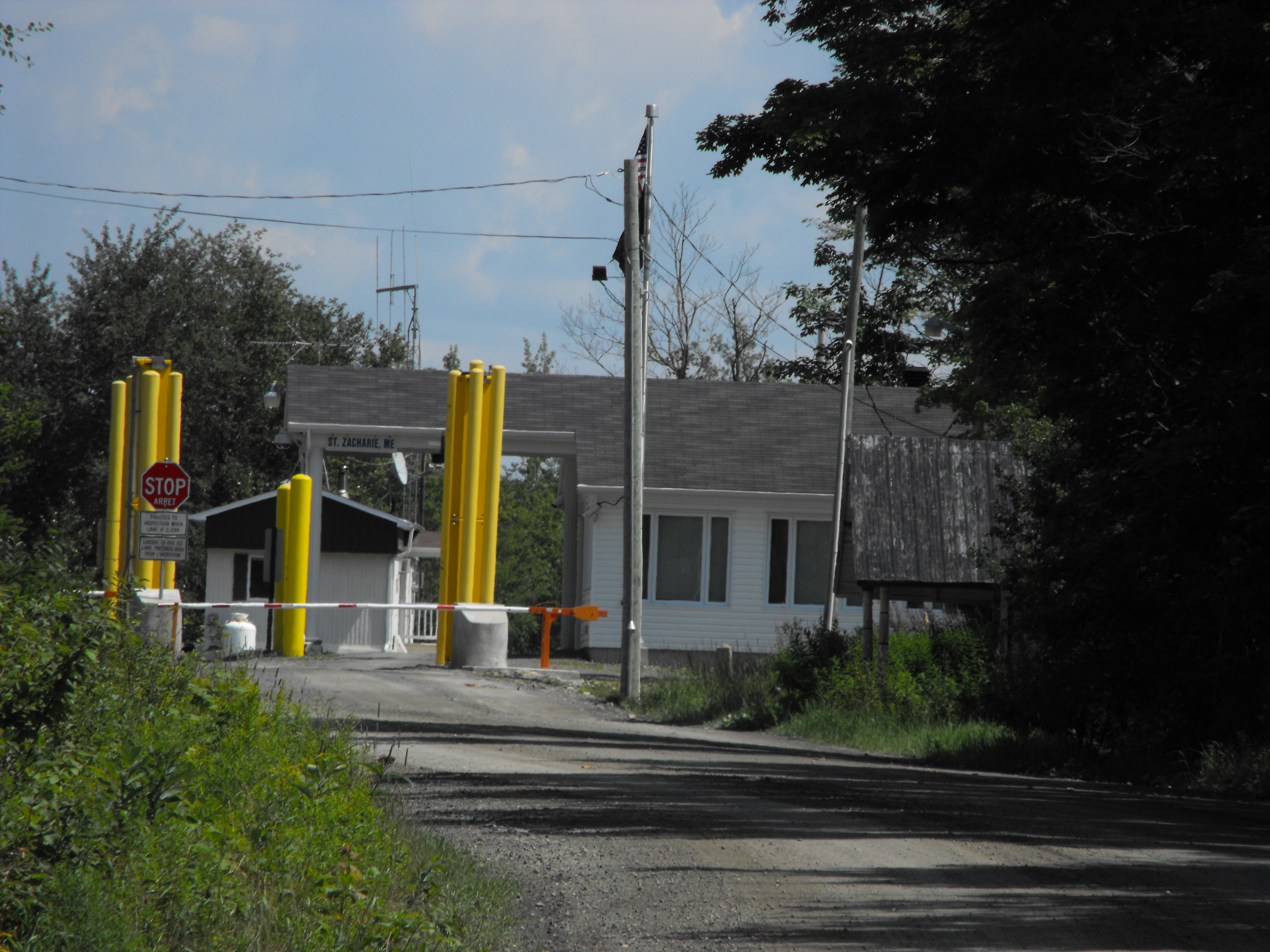
- US Border Inspection Station at St. Zacharie Maine

Location
- Country: United States; Canada
- Location: Golden Road / Route de la Frontière; US Port: Golden Road, St. St. Zacharie, Maine 04945; Canadian Port: None
- Coordinates: 46.092765°N 70.290195°W

Details
- Opened: 1972

Website
- Jackman, Maine - 0104

The St. Zacharie, Maine – St. Zacharie, Quebec border crossing on the Canada–US border is one of four in the Maine Highlands. Two miles south of Little Saint John Lake, it is the westernmost crossing used primarily by people and vehicles involved in logging the forests in the North Maine Woods. Canada does not inspect vehicles entering from Maine at this location. Golden Road, and the roads that connect to it were developed by the Great Northern Paper Company to support its logging operations.

== See also ==
- List of Canada–United States border crossings
