= West Branch Penobscot River =

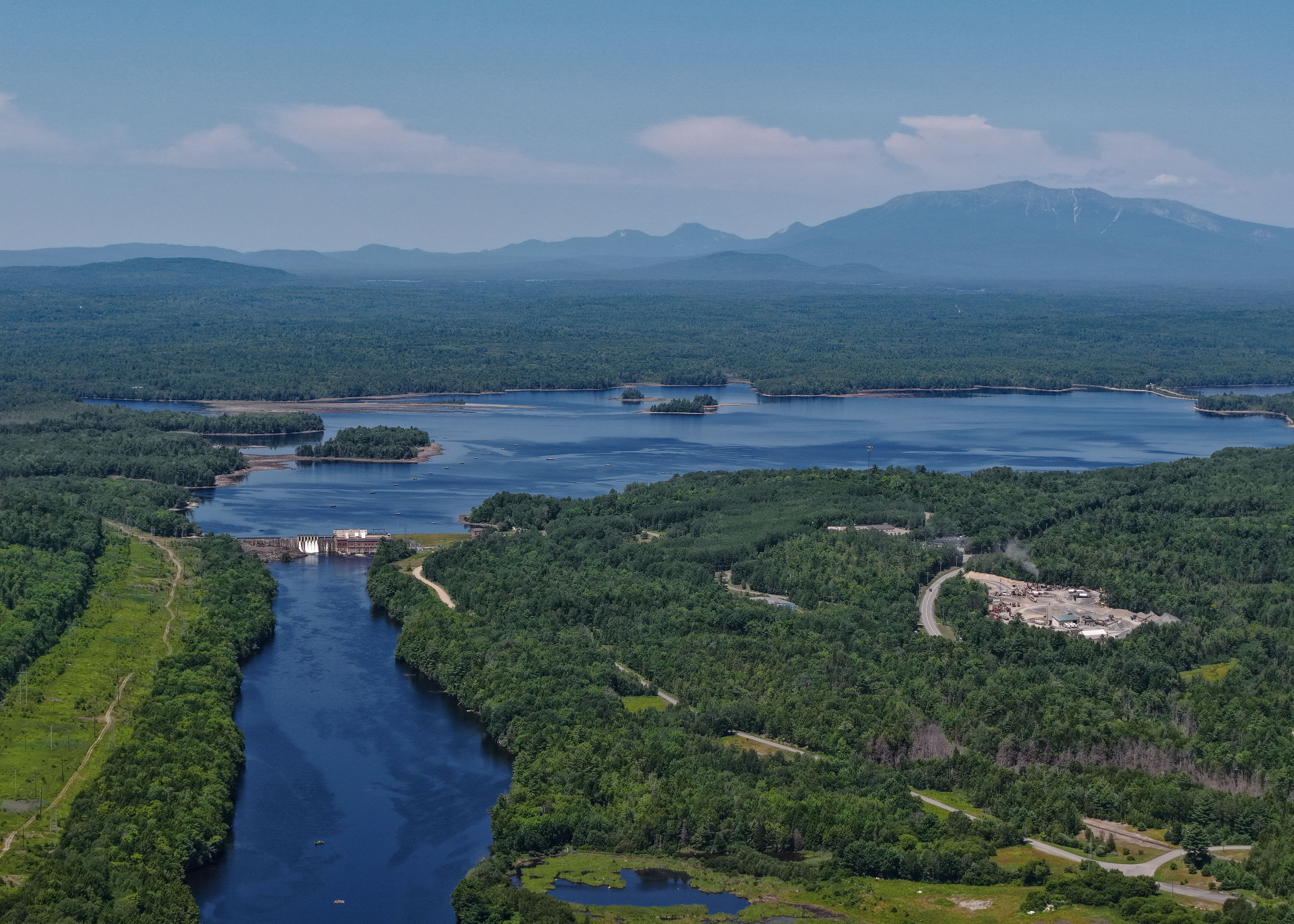
- West branch near East Millinocket

Location
- Country: United States

Physical characteristics
- Source
  - location: Maine
  - elevation: 1,020 feet (310 m)
- Mouth
  - location: Penobscot River
  - coordinates: 45°36′25″N 68°32′28″W
  - elevation: 240 feet (70 m)
- Length: 117 miles (188 km)
- Basin size: 2,012 sq mi (5,210 km^{2})

The West Branch Penobscot River is a 117-mile-long (188 km) tributary of the Penobscot River through the North Maine Woods in Maine. The river is also known as Abocadneticook (Abenaki for "stream narrowed by mountains"), Kahgognamock, and Kettegwewick (Abenaki for "place of the great stream").

== Course ==
The river flows from Seboomook Lake in Seboomook, Somerset County. The lake's principal inflows are the North Branch and South Branch Penobscot River. From Seboomook Dam (45°54′39″N 69°43′58″W) the river runs about 25 miles (40 km) east and northeast to Chesuncook Lake, thence (after flowing through Chesuncook) about 20 miles (32 km) southeast through the southwest corner of Baxter State Park to the Pemadumcook Chain of Lakes, thence generally east to its confluence with the Penobscot's East Branch in Medway, Penobscot County.

== History ==
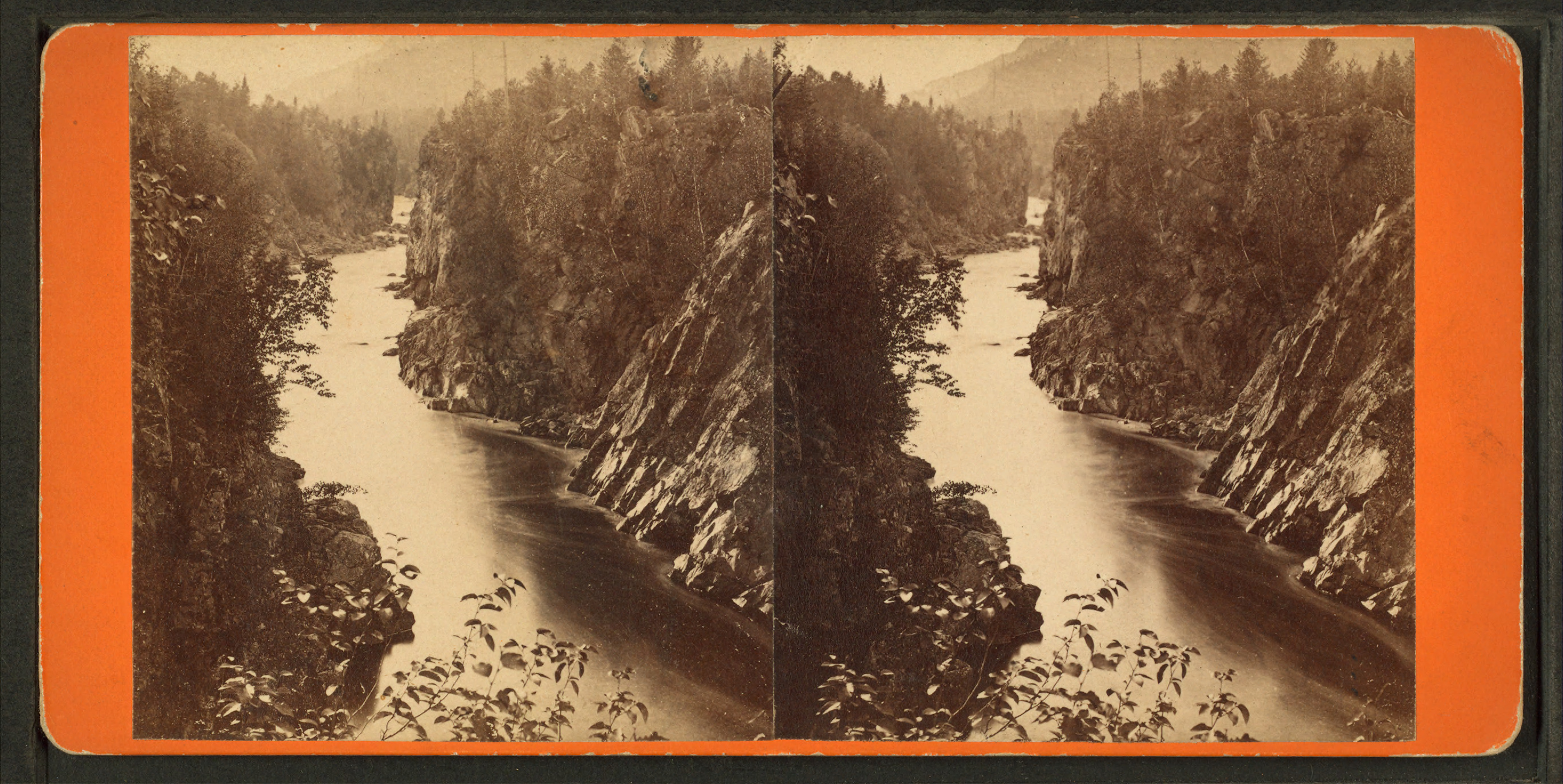
West branch at Ripogenus Gorge in the 1870s

The west branch drains spruce forests of the southern part of the Maine North Woods, and drops 1,174 feet (358 m) to Medway from sources along the Maine-Quebec border. Logging of the west branch began in 1828. Logs were loaded onto sleds towed to the river by draft animals. Log drives would float the logs downstream as far as Bangor, Maine when the snow and ice melted. Sawmill business on the west branch peaked in 1872.

Twentieth-century history of the west branch was heavily influenced by the paper mill at Millinocket, Maine. The Bangor and Aroostook Railroad bridged the west branch near Quakish Lake in 1894; and the Maine legislature chartered the Northern Development Company in 1897 to create and sell hydroelectricity for manufacturing. The company was renamed Great Northern Paper Company (GNP) in 1899. A dam was completed at the outlet of Quakish Lake diverting flow through Ferguson Pond and a canal to a paper mill on Millinocket Stream. The west branch between Quakish Lake and Shad Pond virtually dried up as flow through the canal dropped 114 feet (35 m) through the mill powering eight paper machines producing 240 tons of newsprint per day from groundwood and sulfite pulp. What was then the largest paper mill in the world began operation in 1900 and within a year had captured twelve percent of the United States newsprint market. GNP held that market share for 16 years by increasing hydroelectricity output of the west branch.

In 1903 the Maine legislature gave control of the west branch above Shad Pond to GNP subsidiary West Branch Driving and Reservoir Dam Company. GNP harnessed 405 feet (123 m) of the 678 feet (207 m) drop from Chesuncook Lake to Medway with dams at Chesuncook Lake, Lower Lake, Sourdnahunk Falls, Ambejejus Falls, Canada Falls, Seboomook Lake, and Ripogenus. The East Millinockett mill project completed in 1907 included harnessing the 25 feet (7.6 m) drop at Burnt Land Rips and 50 feet (15 m) drop at Dolby Rips. Ripogenus Dam was completed in 1916 as the largest storage dam ever privately built. By 1933 GNP had constructed storage capacity of 57 billion cubic feet on the west branch.

The west branch also transported pulpwood to Millinocket. Log drives initially floated 20- or 24-foot (6.1-7.3 m) "long logs" to the mill. Pulpwood was cut into shorter 4-foot (1.2 m) lengths beginning in 1917; and the last "long log" drive was in 1928. As forests within the west branch drainage were converted to pulpwood, GNP built the Eagle Lake and West Branch Railroad and the Seboomook Lake and Saint John Railroad to transport pulpwood from the Allagash and Saint John river drainage basins into the west branch log drives. Environmental concerns ended river transport of pulpwood in 1971 when Great Northern opened the Golden Road (Maine) which parallels the river to the mill in Millinocket. The privately owned Golden Road remains the primary road access to the river. The lumber industry continued to diminish, and plans for a dam at Big Amberjackmockamus Falls were thwarted in 1986. The Millinocket paper mill was closed and partially torn down in 2008.

== Recreation ==
The Appalachian Trail crosses the West Branch at Abol Bridge (45°50′07″N 68°58′02″W), at the northeast end of the Hundred-Mile Wilderness. The trail then runs upstream along the river for 3 miles (5 km), until it follows Nesowadnehunk Stream into Baxter Park on the way to its northern terminus on Mount Katahdin.

The Northern Forest Canoe Trail follows the West Branch between the portage from Moosehead Lake in North East Carry (45°53′39″N 69°36′37″W), and Chesuncook Lake (46°04′12″N 69°25′10″W). Penstock releases from Chesuncook Lake create a popular whitewater run through Ripogenus Gorge.

The West Branch of the Penobscot is most currently noted for it recreational use on its multiple significant Class IV and V rapids. It is used commercially by rafting, kayaking, and boogie boarding outfits, as well as non-commercial recreational paddling.

The West Branch is also renowned for its Atlantic [landlocked] salmon populations and draws fisherman from all over the world.

== See also ==
- List of rivers of Maine
- North Maine Woods topics
