= 2008 Saint John River flood =

Flood in New Brunswick, Canada and Maine, United States

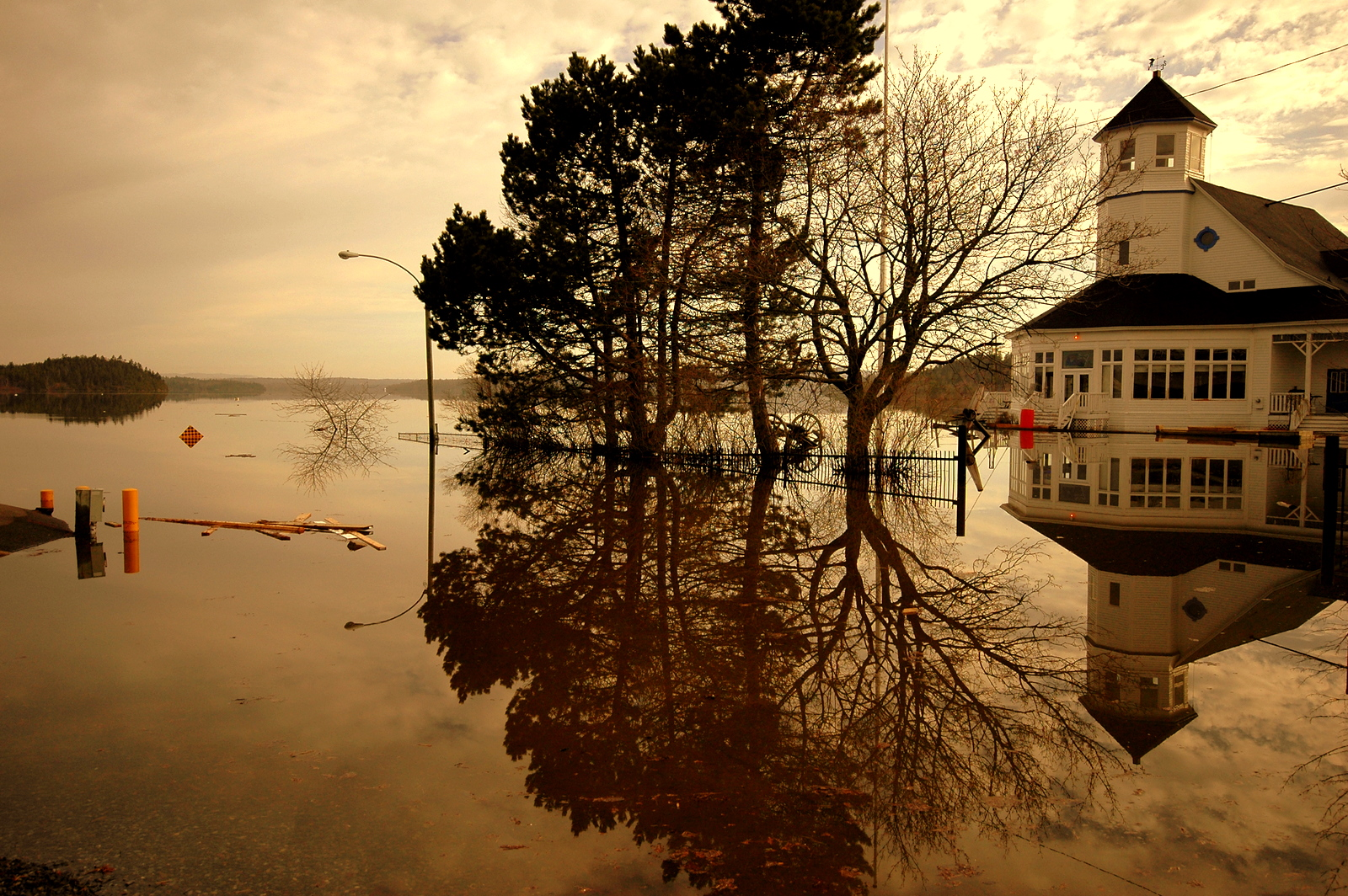
- On-street flood level

Meteorological history
- Duration: April - May 2008

Overall effects
- Damage: 11.9 million CDN$
- Areas affected: -Edmundston, New Brunswick -Fredericton, New Brunswick -Maugerville, New Brunswick -Fort Kent, Maine -Madawaska, Maine -Van Buren, Maine

The 2008 Saint John River flood was considered the worst flooding of the Saint John River in 35 years. Flood levels reached 27 feet and 4 inches in Fredericton on May 1, almost reaching the previous record of 28 feet and 3 inches, set in 1973. Flooding was attributed to the melting of record snowfall from the 2007-2008 winter and heavy rain during the melting season. Fifty streets in Fredericton area were closed as a result of the flooding. The flooding caused severe damage in areas of northern Maine and western New Brunswick including international bridges and hundreds of homes and buildings.

By May 3, the Canadian Red Cross had registered 680 residents who had been forced to evacuate from their homes. An additional 600 residences were evacuated in Maine.

== See also ==
- 1973 Saint John River Flood
