= Carex foenea =

Scientific classification
- Kingdom: Plantae
- Clade: Tracheophytes
- Clade: Angiosperms
- Clade: Monocots
- Clade: Commelinids
- Order: Poales
- Family: Cyperaceae
- Genus: Carex
- Species: C. foenea

Binomial name
- Carex foenea Willd.

Synonyms
- Carex aenea Fernald; Carex argyrantha var. aenea (Fernald) B.Boivin; Carex foenea var. aenea (Fernald) Kük.; Vignea foenea (Willd.) Rchb.

Species of plant

Carex foenea is a species of flowering plant in the family Cyperaceae, native from subarctic America to the northern United States. It was first described by Carl Ludwig Willdenow in 1809.

Some sources regard Carex foenea as a synonym of Carex siccata, others treat it as a full species.
