= South Branch Penobscot River =

Location
- Country: United States

Physical characteristics
- Source
  - location: Maine
  - elevation: 1,860 feet (570 m)
- Mouth
  - location: Seboomook Lake
  - coordinates: 45°53′53″N 69°57′58″W
  - elevation: 1,070 feet (330 m)
- Length: 39 mi (63 km)

Basin features
- Progression: West Branch – Penobscot River

The South Branch Penobscot River is a river in Somerset County, Maine. Its source, Penobscot lake, the north end of which at (45°47′34″N 70°24′36″W) is about 1,000 feet (300 m) from the Canada–United States border in Sandy Bay (Maine Township 5, Range 3, NBKP). This section of the border runs along the height of land separating the watersheds of the Penobscot River and the Monument River, which feeds into the Saint Lawrence River.

The South Branch of the Penobscot River runs 39.0 miles (62.8 km) northeast through Canada Falls Lake to its drowned confluence with the North Branch of the Penobscot in Seboomook Lake in Pittston Academy Grant (T.2 R.4 NBKP). The two rivers combine to form the West Branch Penobscot River, which flows east from the outlet of Seboomook Lake.

== Canada Falls Lake ==
Canada Falls Lake
- Location within Maine
- Location: Somerset County, Maine
- Coordinates: 45°49′N 70°03′W
- Basin countries: United States
- Max. length: 6 mi (9.7 km)
- Surface area: 2,305 acres (933 ha)
- Max. depth: 24 feet (7.3 m)
- Water volume: 17,841 acre⋅ft (22,007,000 m^{3})
- Surface elevation: 1,237 ft (377 m)

Canada Falls Lake is impounded by an early 20th-century dam built on the South Branch Penobscot River 5 miles (8.0 km) upstream of its confluence with the North Branch Penobscot River. The lake created behind the dam in Pittston Academy Grant floods the South Branch Penobscot River westerly into Alder Brook Township and tributary Alder Brook southerly into Soldiertown Township. Most of the lake is less than 15 feet (4.6 m) deep. When full, Canada Falls Lake has the largest surface area of any lake on the South Branch Penobscot River; but the lake is usually drained by late summer, and remains low until filled by snowmelt the following spring. Brook trout spawning upstream of the lake and in tributaries Hale Brook, Mullen Brook, and Cunningham Brook spend the warmer months in cool spring seepage areas in the main river channel through the lake.

== See also ==
- List of rivers of Maine
