= North Branch Penobscot River =

Location
- Country: United States

Physical characteristics
- Source
  - location: Maine
  - elevation: 1,290 feet (390 m)
- Mouth
  - location: Seboomook Lake
  - coordinates: 45°54′09″N 69°57′40″W
  - elevation: 1,070 feet (330 m)
- Length: 28 mi (45 km)

Basin features
- Progression: West Branch Penobscot River – Penobscot River

The North Branch Penobscot River is a river in Somerset County, Maine. From its source at the outlet of Little Bog (46°09′23″N 69°57′21″W) about 10 miles (16 km) east of the Canada–United States border in Maine Township 6, Range 17, WELS, the river runs 27.8 miles (44.7 km) southwest and southeast to its drowned confluence with the South Branch of the Penobscot River in Seboomook Lake in Pittston Academy Grant (T.2 R.4 NBKP).

In 1939, the Great Northern Paper Company impounded Fifth St. John Pond in T.6 R.17 and dug a 2-mile-long (3.2 km) canal from the pond allowing the diversion of water from the Saint John River's Baker Branch into the Penobscot's North Branch, to sluice wood to the company mill at Millinocket. Yellow perch also used the canal to spread into the upper Penobscot River drainage.

== See also ==
- List of rivers of Maine
