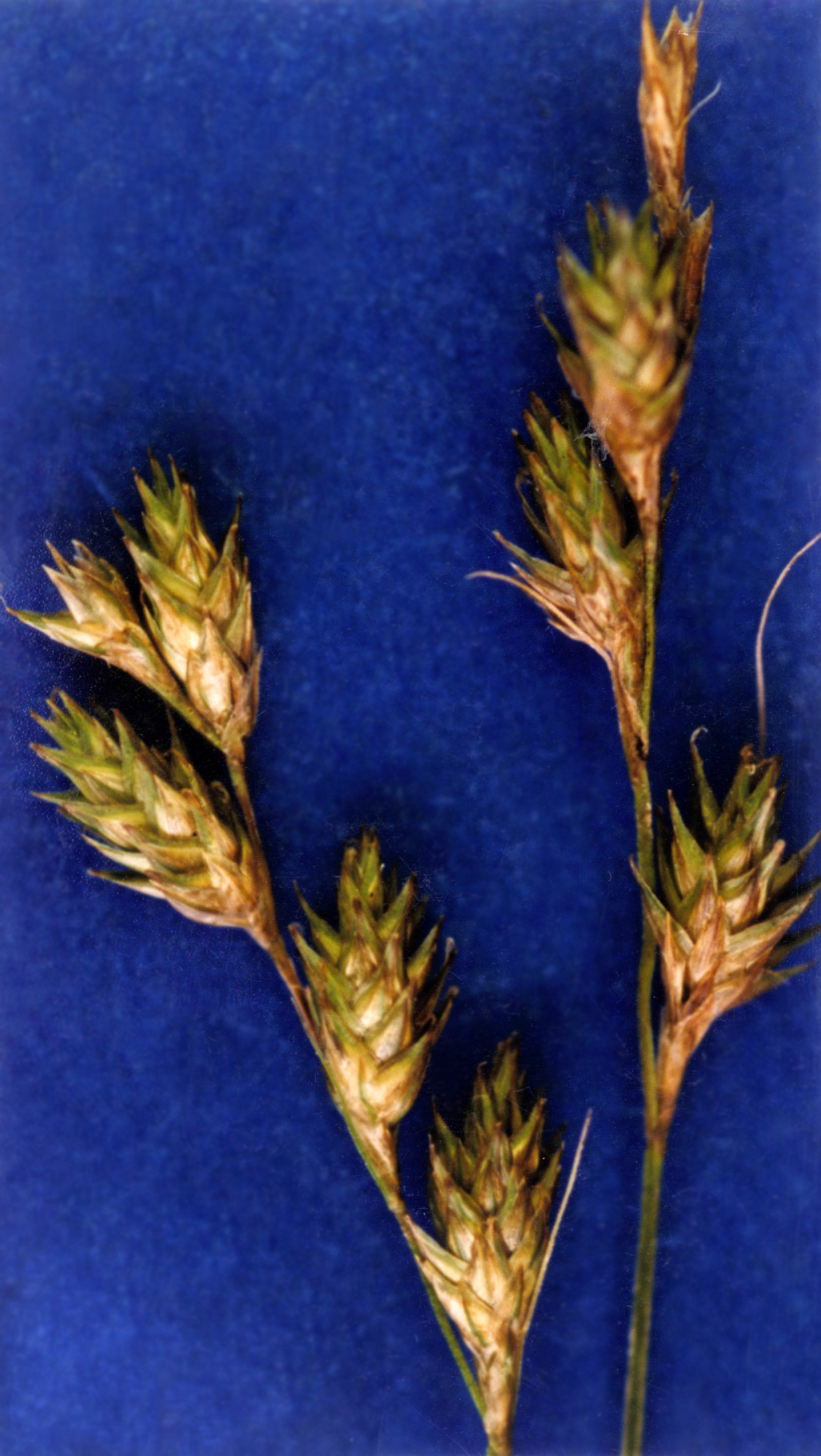

Scientific classification
- Kingdom: Plantae
- Clade: Tracheophytes
- Clade: Angiosperms
- Clade: Monocots
- Clade: Commelinids
- Order: Poales
- Family: Cyperaceae
- Genus: Carex
- Species: C. siccata

Binomial name
- Carex siccata Dewey

Synonyms
- Carex adusta var. argyrantha L.H.Bailey; Carex adusta var. sparsiflora L.H.Bailey; Carex albolutescens var. argyrantha (L.H.Bailey) Olney ex L.H.Bailey; Carex foenea var. sparsiflora Howe; Carex foenea var. tuberculata F.J.Herm.; Carex liddonii J.Carey, nom. illeg.; Carex siccata var. obscurior Kük.

= Carex siccata =

Species of grass-like plant

Carex siccata, common names including dryspike sedge, is a species of Carex native to North America. It is listed as endangered in New Jersey. As of May 2021, USDA Plants regards Carex foenea as a synonym of C. siccata, whereas the World Checklist of Selected Plant Families regards only two varieties of C. foenea as synonyms, treating C. foenea itself as a separate species.

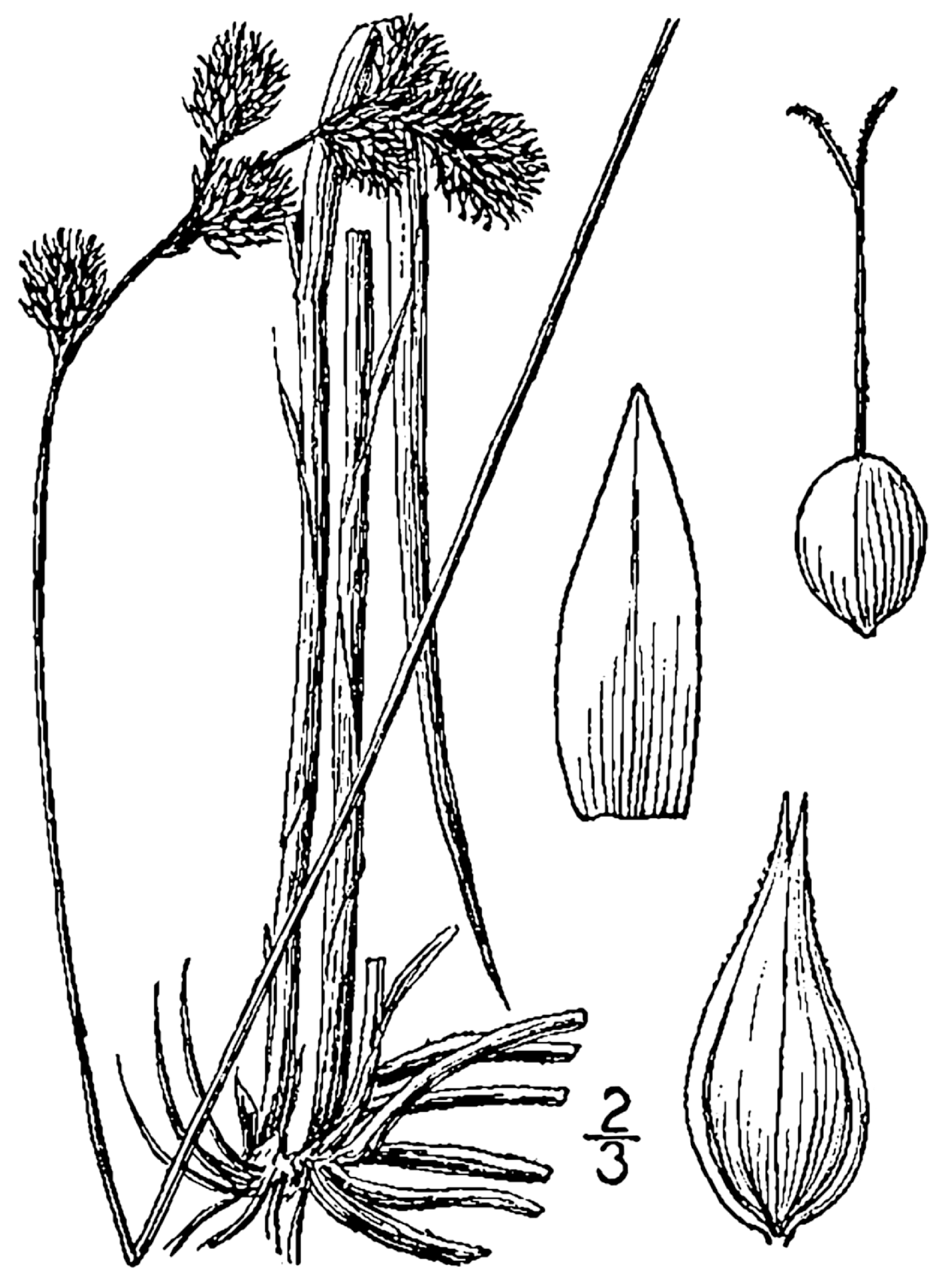
Botanical illustration

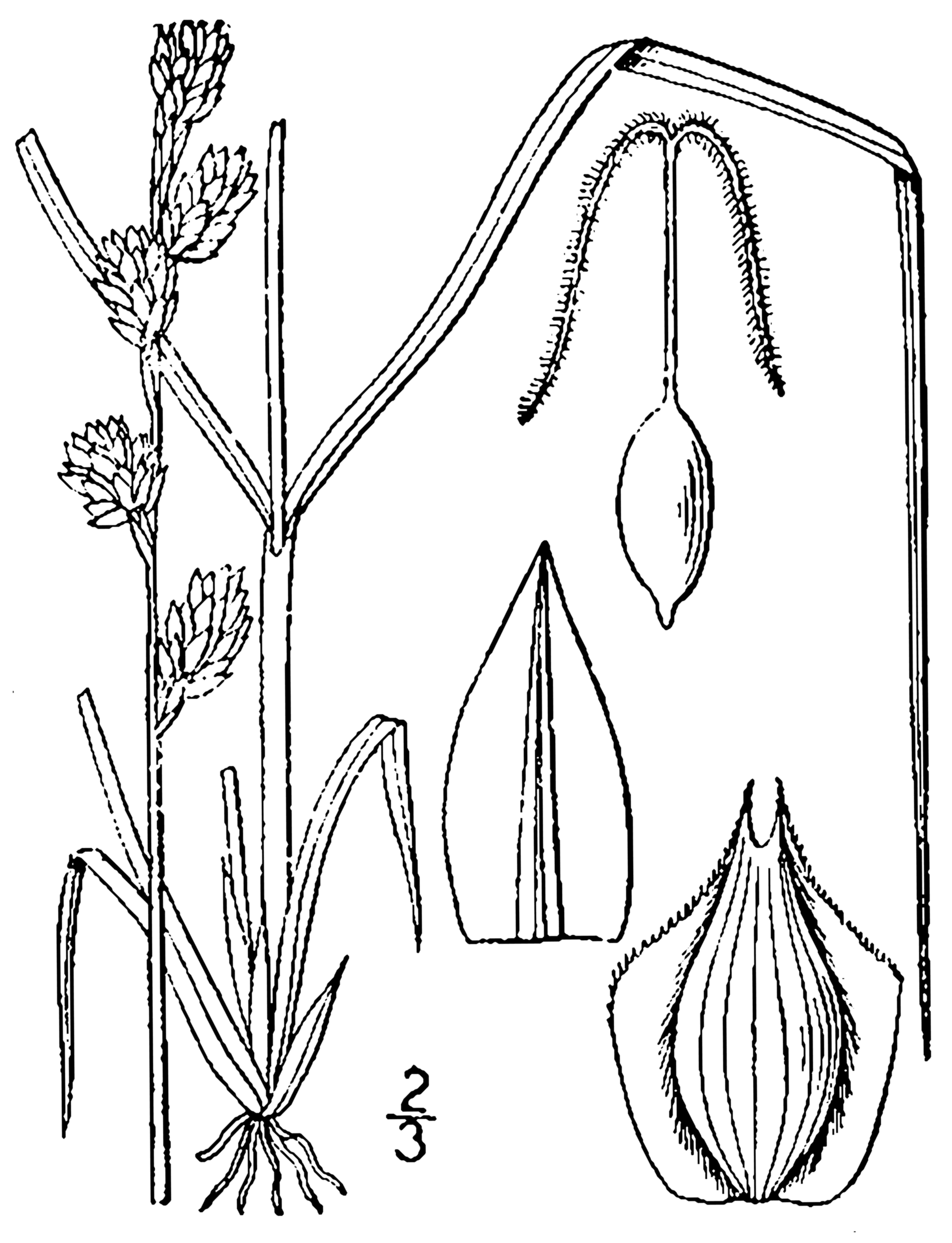
Botanical illustration

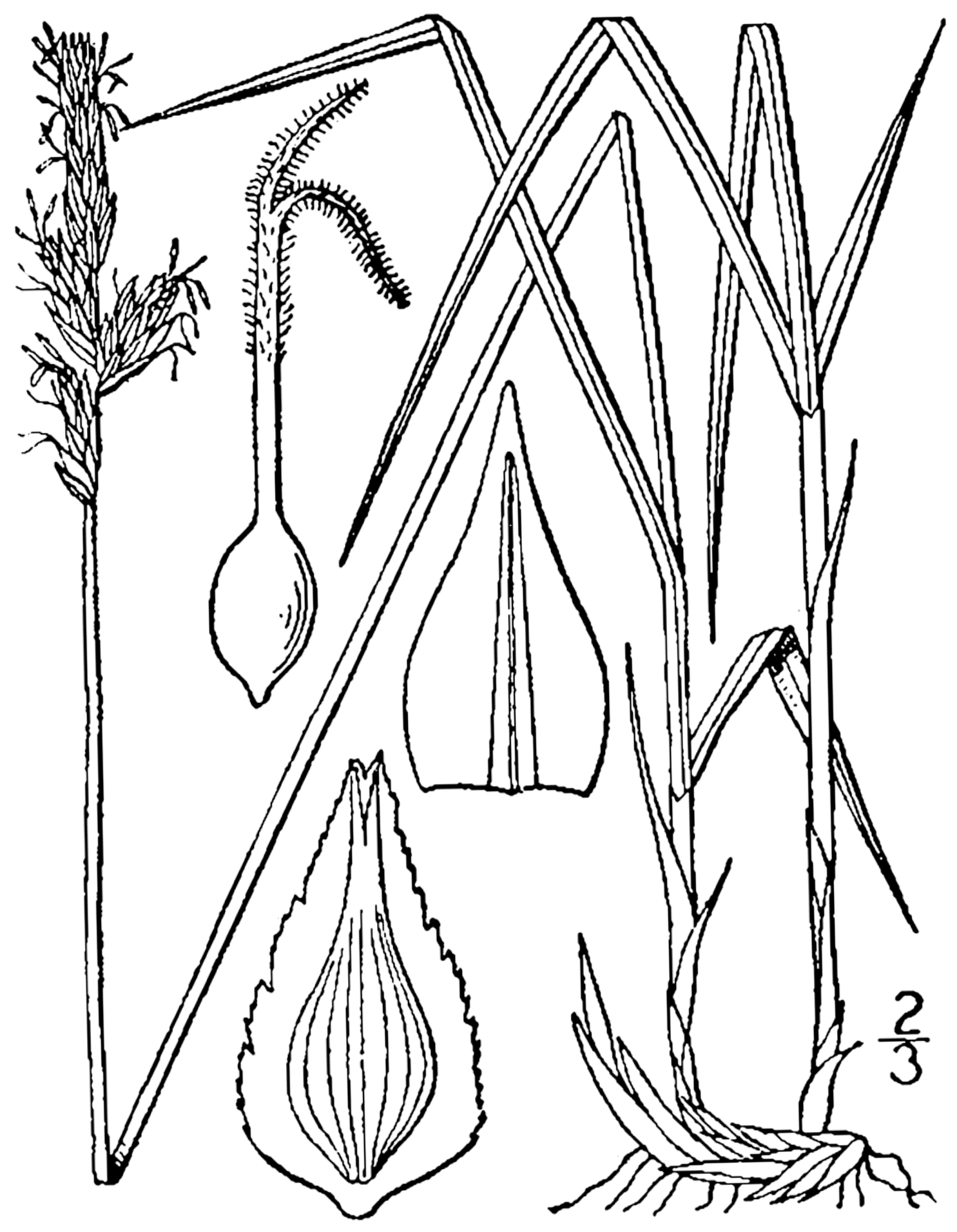
Botanical illustration

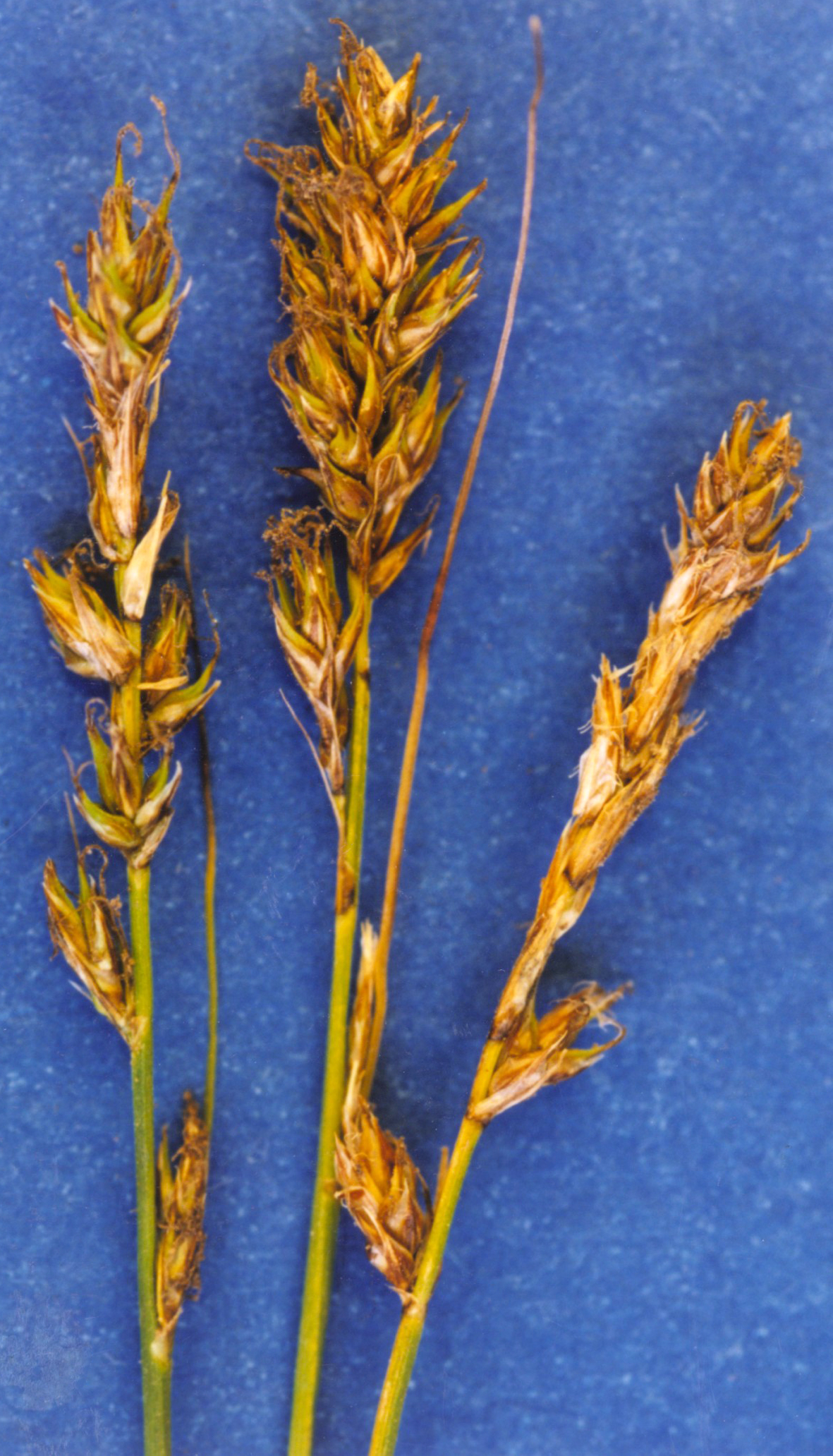
Photograph
