= Golden Road (Maine) =

Private road in Maine, United States

Route information
- Length: 96 mi (154 km)
- Existed: 1969–present

The Golden Road is a 96-mile (154 km) private road built by the Great Northern Paper Company that stretches from the St. Zacharie Border Crossing to its former mill at Millinocket, Maine.

The road, which parallels the West Branch of the Penobscot River, was built between 1969 and 1972 to bring raw wood to the mill from the company's 2.1 million acres (8,500 km^{2}) of woodland in the Maine North Woods. Before the road was built logs were floated down the river to the mill.

The 32 miles (51 km) of the road from the Millinocket mill to Ripogenus Dam is partly paved and the remaining 65 miles (105 km) is stone.

Great Northern had always allowed private drivers access to the road (except for the portion next to the mill) and it is a major thoroughfare into the North Woods for sportsmen and white water paddlers on the Penobscot.

The road's name is often believed to have been because of its cost (Great Northern said in the 1980s the cost of maintaining its road network was $6.8 million/year) but company officials said the road was actually considered a big cost savings—noting the shipping timber down the river took about 18 months and there would be loss of logs in the process and the road shortened the process to a few days. Others believe that the road was named after its appearance; the color of the dirt was so yellow that the road appeared to be the color gold.

Great Northern's economic hold on the road has been greatly diminished, and it has announced plans to tear down almost all of the buildings at the Millinocket mill. The road is now owned by four companies. A proposal in 2007 for the state of Maine to investigate acquiring the road was defeated.
