= 1973 Saint John River flood =

Flood in New Brunswick, Canada

- Location: Fredericton, New Brunswick Maugerville, New Brunswick
- Deaths: 1
- Property damage: $11.9 million (1973 CDN) $78 million (2008 CDN)

The 1973 Saint John River flood in late April 1973 was the most significant flood ever recorded on the Saint John River. The flood inundated many parts of the city of Fredericton, New Brunswick and its surrounding farmlands killing at least one person and causing nearly 12 million dollars (78 million adjusted to 2008 dollars) in damages.

The flood was created by a combination of heavy rain in the watershed and snow melt.

"Flooding occurred in several places along the St. John that spring—among them, Edmundston, Grand Falls, Perth-Andover, Hartland, Woodstock and parts of Maine. But by far the most dramatic effects were in the lower valley. In Fredericton, the river level reached 28.3 feet, or 25 feet above its normal summer level. Water spilled into older residential areas, lapped against newer subdivisions, and welled up around public buildings."
