= Saint John River (Bay of Fundy) =

River in Canada and the United States forming part of the Maine–New Brunswick border

Saint John River: Fleuve Saint-Jean; Wolastoq
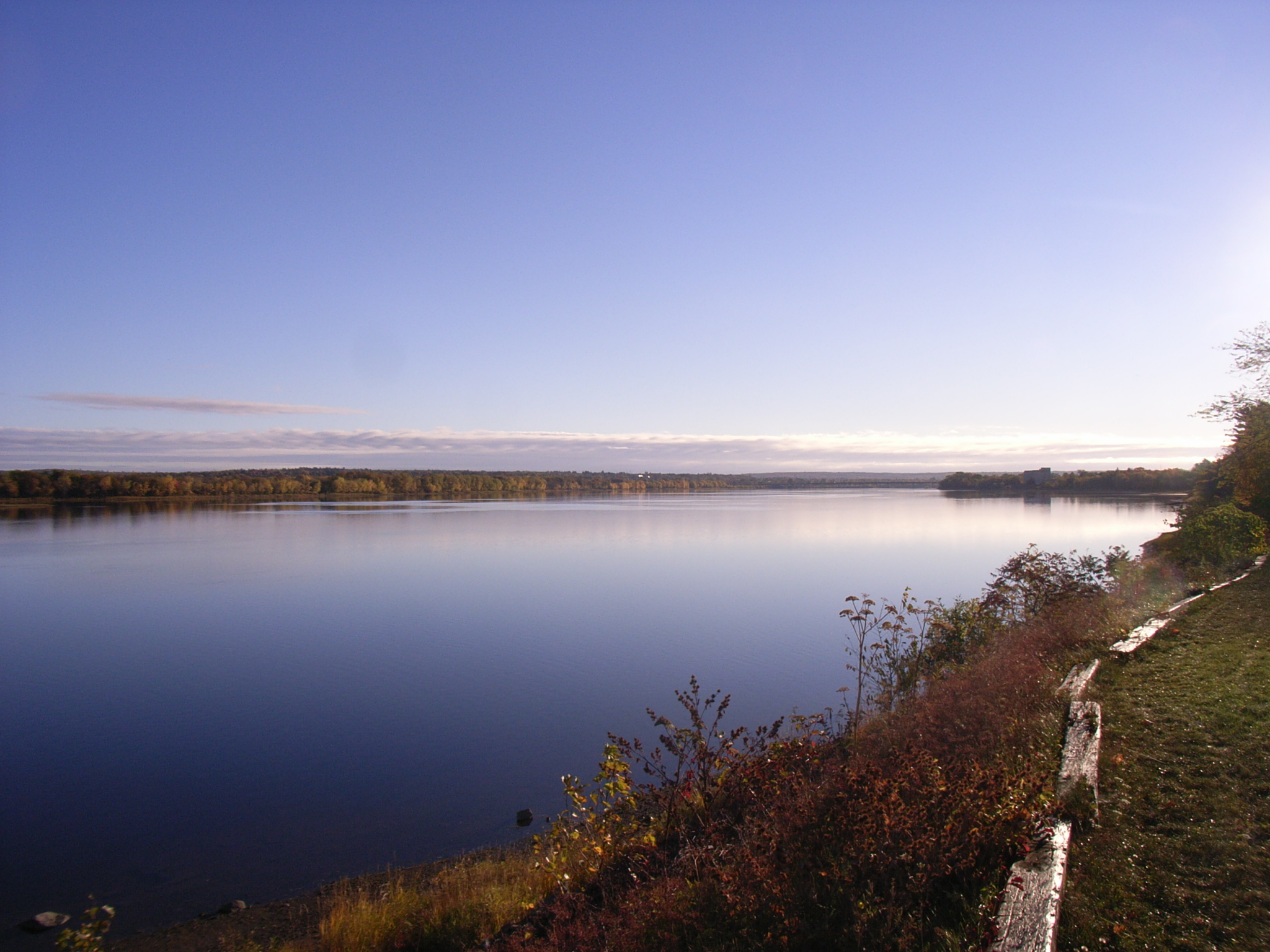
- Saint John River in Madawaska, Maine
- Etymology: Named by Samuel de Champlain on the feast day of John the Baptist; Wolastoq means "beautiful river"

Location
- Countries: Canada; United States
- Province: New Brunswick
- State: Maine
- Cities: Edmundston; Fredericton; Saint John

Physical characteristics
- Source: Saint John Ponds
  - location: Somerset County, Maine, United States
  - elevation: 360 m (1,180 ft)
- Mouth: Bay of Fundy
  - location: Saint John, New Brunswick, Canada
  - coordinates: 45°16′N 66°4′W
- Length: 673 km (418 mi)
- Basin size: 54,986 km^{2} (21,230 sq mi)
- Discharge
  - average: 990 m^{3}/s (35,000 cu ft/s)

Basin features
- Tributaries
  - left: Tobique River, Jemseg River, Kennebecasis River
  - right: Allagash River, Aroostook River, Nerepis River

Designations

National Historic Site of Canada
- Official name: Wolastoq National Historic Site of Canada
- Designated: July 19, 2011
- Reference no.: 18954

The Saint John River (French: fleuve Saint-Jean; Malecite-Passamaquoddy: Wolastoq, meaning “beautiful river”) is a 673-kilometre-long (418 mi) river flowing from headwaters in the Notre Dame Mountains near the Maine–Quebec border of the United States and Canada through northern Maine and western New Brunswick to the northwest shore of the Bay of Fundy. It is the longest river in eastern Canada.

Its drainage basin is one of the largest on the east coast of North America, covering approximately 55,000 square kilometres (21,000 sq mi).

The river and its tributaries historically formed the traditional territories of the Wolastoqiyik and Passamaquoddy peoples prior to European colonization, and it remains culturally significant to the Wabanaki Confederacy.

The Webster–Ashburton Treaty following the Aroostook War established a border between New Brunswick and Maine along approximately 130 km (81 mi) of the river, while the Saint Francis River—a tributary—forms about 55 km (34 mi) of the border between Quebec and Maine.

Communities along the river in Maine include Fort Kent, Madawaska, and Van Buren. In New Brunswick the river passes through Edmundston, Fredericton, Oromocto, and Saint John.

The river is regulated by hydroelectric dams at Beechwood Dam, Mactaquac Dam, and Grand Falls Generating Station.

== Hydronym ==
Samuel de Champlain visited the mouth of the river on the feast day of John the Baptist in 1604 and renamed it the Rivière Saint-Jean or Saint John River in English. Many waterways in the system retain their original pre-European names. The Wolastoqiyik call it the Wolastoq, meaning bountiful and good and seek to restore this name.

== Geography and ecology ==
=== Upper basin ===
The headwaters are in the New England/Acadian forests of Maine and Quebec, including the Southwest, Northwest, and Baker branches, and the Allagash River flowing into New Brunswick at Edmundston where it is joined by the Madawaska River.

=== Middle basin ===
The middle section runs from the confluence of the Aroostook and Tobique rivers, flowing southeast to Mactaquac Dam. Other tributaries in this section include the Meduxnekeag River. This area is the only place in Atlantic Canada where Appalachian Hardwood Forest is found. Plants rare for the province include wild ginger, black raspberry, wild coffee, maidenhair fern, showy orchis and others. This forest type, also known as the Saint John River Valley Hardwood Forest, once spread of much of the area and has been reduced to less than one percent of the land area because of human activities. This is an area of rolling hills and soils that are the most fertile and heavily farmed in New Brunswick. Soils are fine, loamy, and well-drained glacial tills overlaying limestone and sandstone.

The climate here is drier and warmer than surrounding regions.

=== Lower basin ===
The lower basin, 140 kilometres (87 miles) to Saint John Harbour on the Bay of Fundy, consisting of lakes, islands, wetlands and a tidal estuary. Tributaries in this section include the Nashwaak and Nerepis rivers and Belleisle Bay.

The final tributary, the Kennebecasis River, is a fjord with a sill, or rise in depth near the mouth of a fjord caused by a terminal moraine. From the Grand Bay (New Brunswick), the waterway becomes narrower and deeper forming a gorge where at the Reversing Falls incoming tide forces the flow of water to reverse against the prevailing current. A wedge of salt water, below a surface covering of fresh water, extends upriver to the 10 metres (33 ft) shallows at Oak Point beyond which it cannot advance.

=== Formation and hydrology ===
The drainage basin is 55,000 square kilometres (21,000 sq mi), of which 20,000 square kilometres (7,700 sq mi) is Maine. The average discharge is 1,100 m^{3}/s (39,000 cu ft/s). Water flow is lowest in the autumn, and considerably higher than average during the spring freshet at 6,800 m^{3}/s (240,000 cu ft/s). In early spring, upper sections of the river can experience ice jams causing flooding. In the lower sections in the broader floodplain, flooding may occur during late spring from the volume of water which must make its way through the narrow gorge at the Reversing Falls.

Legally, all of the river downstream of a point between Fredericton and Mactaquac Provincial Park is considered tidal.

The river is mostly calm, except for waterfalls at Grand Falls and at the Beechwood Dam.

=== Flooding ===
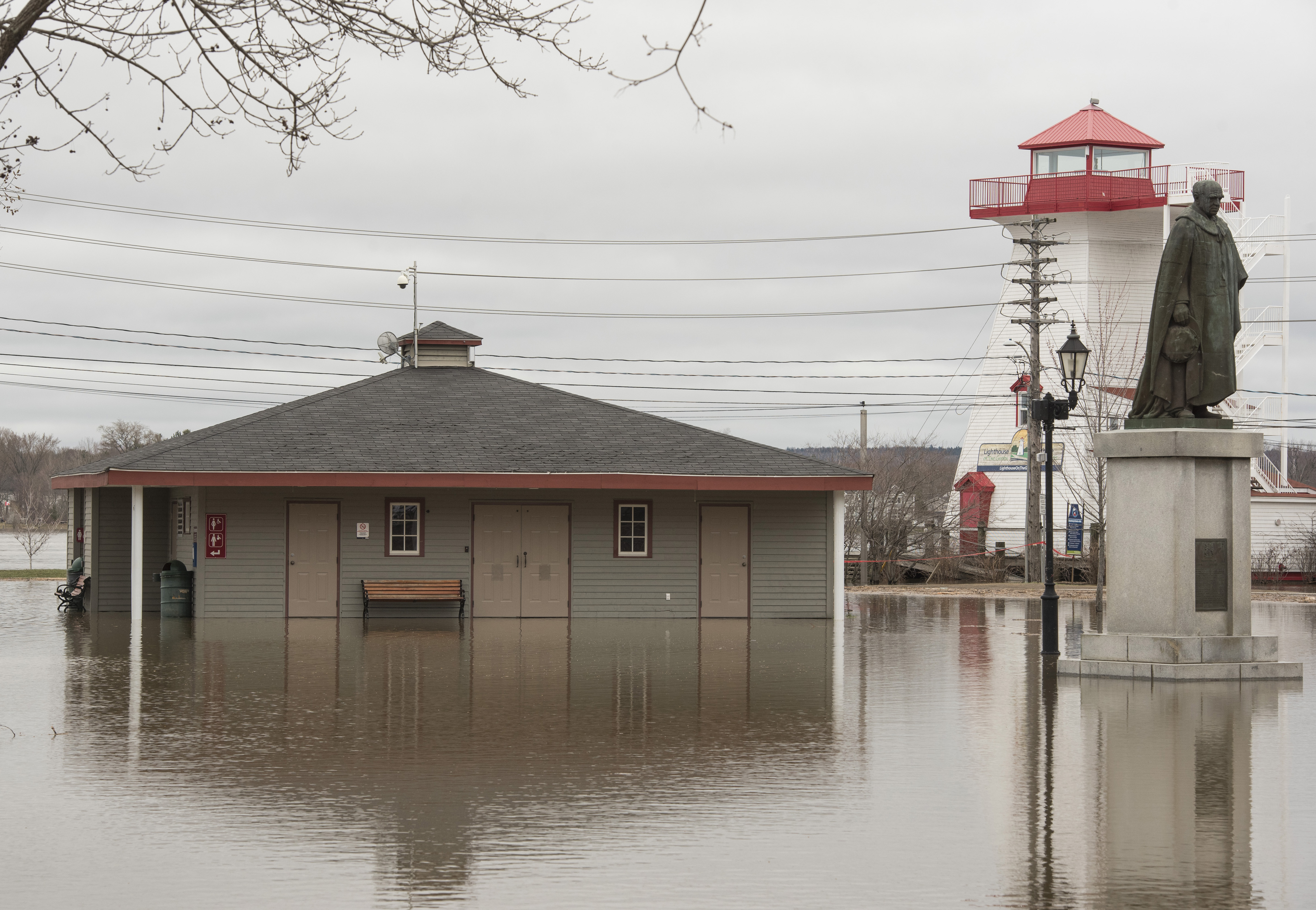
2018 flooding in Fredericton

With the water flow in the spring being six times the average rate, the valley has always been prone to flooding in the spring. Surface runoff from heavy rainfall is the main cause of flooding, and can be exacerbated by ice jams, high tides, and rapid snowmelt. Floods have been documented for more than 300 years. Flooding has occurred in Edmundston, Grand Falls, Perth-Andover, Hartland, Woodstock, and most severely around Fredericton and Saint John.

Major flooding occurred in 1923, with water 8 metres (26 ft) above normal winter low. In 1936, high temperatures quickened snowmelt, and heavy rain raised the water level to 8.9 metres (29 ft), about 7.6 metres (25 ft) above summer level. Similar circumstances led to the same level of high water in the 1973 flood. Similar major flooding occurred again in 2018 and 2019. Since 2019, flooding has not been as severe.

The severity and frequency of flooding is expected to increase, with climate change. It is predicted that New Brunswick's average temperature will increase by as much as 5 C (9 °F) by the year 2100, and that precipitation will increase.

== Human history ==
At the end of the last glacial period, following the retreat of the Laurentide Ice Sheet about 13,000 years ago, the area was stripped bare of vegetation and soil. By about 10,000 years ago, Paleo-Indians probably occupied what is now New Brunswick. Major disturbances did not begin until the early 1800s with the arrival of large numbers of Europeans.

=== First Nations ===
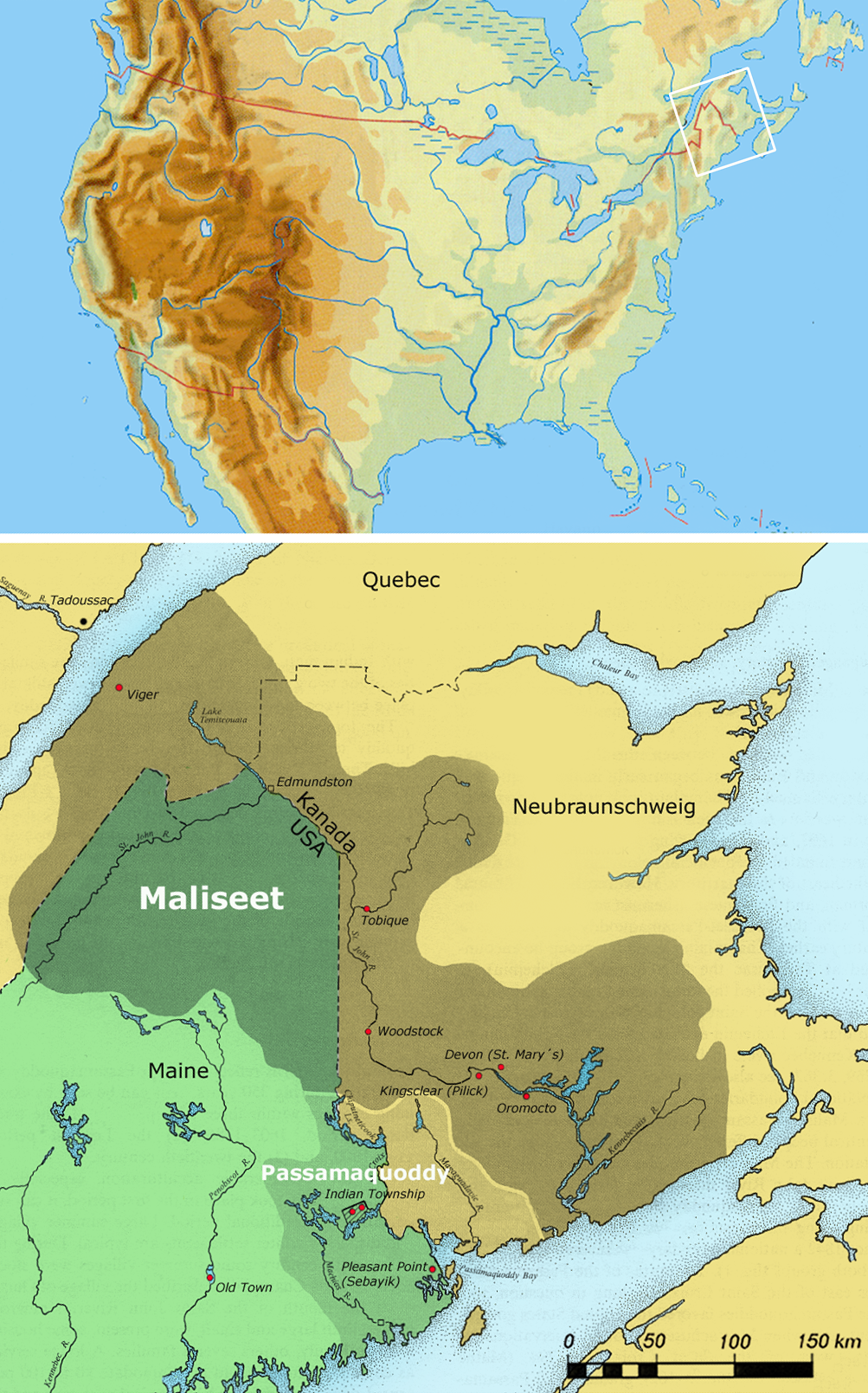
Wolastoqiyik Territory (labeled as Maliseet in the English translation)

The eastern Algonquin languages had different dialects associated with each of the major river systems of New England and the Maritimes; and there was often a linguistic bifurcation between residents of the upper river and those living along the coast and tidal estuary. The Passamaquoddy hunted sea mammals along the northwest shore of the Bay of Fundy while speaking a mutually intelligible dialect with the Wolastoqiyik who were inland hunters along the upper Saint John River and its tributaries. The Wolastoqiyik dealt with freshets by having their village above the floodplain, for example Meductic, while cultivating at a lower elevation where the fields were fertilized by the floodwaters. The Wolastoqiyik identified themselves as inhabitants of the river their canoes traveled for hunting, fishing, and trading. Archaeological evidence is that the Wolastoqiyik had economic and cultural ties with large portions of North America from their country's homebase within the Dawnland. Early 16th century fur trade with French fishermen encouraged increased interest in the smaller tributaries and headwaters where scarcity of edible prey kept population density low. After spending the winter hunting and trapping in the interior, the villages of Ouigoudi at the mouth of the river and Aukpaque at the head of navigation were summer gathering places accessible to European fur traders. Fur traders brought European diseases reducing the estimated Wolastoqiyik population to less than a thousand by 1612, but the fur traders' contribution to the First Nations gene pool would provide some disease resistance. No pure blooded Wolastoqiyik or Passamquoddy survived the 20th century.

=== European colonization ===
When the Europeans arrived into Wolastokuk, the homeland of the Wolastoqiyik and Saint John River basin, they found the locals hunting, gathering, and farming near the banks of the river. Rivalry between English and French fur traders pre-dated colonization of North America. Ouigoudi was defensively fortified as Fort La Tour and Aukpaque became known as Sainte-Anne des Pays-Bas when Acadian colonists settled the lower river valley. The First Nations regarded the fur traders more favorably than later settlers who started taking their land and preventing its historic use for subsistence. European colonists may have used fields and town sites prepared by the natives. Colonization pressure was less severe along the Saint John River where the cold water eddy of the Gulf of Maine kept the growing season shorter than Massachusetts and the Nova Scotia peninsula nearer the warm Gulf Stream. The earliest Acadians were descendants of the French sailors and shipwrights whose focus on fishing, trading, and boat repair rather than agriculture minimized land use conflicts. These Acadians maintained favorable relationships with the First Nations while King Philip's War encouraged the Wolastoqiyik to join the Wabanaki Confederacy in military action against New England. French colonists populated the lower river valley as part of Acadia, with Fort Nashwaak in present-day Fredericton, Fort Boishebert at the confluence of the Saint John and Nerepsis rivers. In the French seigneurial system lands were arranged in long, narrow strips, called seigneuries, along the banks of the river. However, this was not practical given the seasonal flooding, and the Acadians moved to higher ground. The Wolastoqiyik became steadfast allies of the Acadians through the subsequent French and Indian Wars; and their Saint John River valley became the last holdout of Acadian refusal to declare allegiance to the British monarchy. As the longest river between the Chesapeake Bay and the Gulf of Saint Lawrence, the Saint John offered one of the best transportation corridors for First Nations refugees to retreat from the English colonization of North America's Atlantic coast. About a thousand Wolastoqiyik sheltered a hundred Acadian families retreating up the Saint John to avoid the Acadian Expulsion as the St. John River Campaign killed livestock and burned Acadian settlements as far upstream as Sainte-Anne des Pays-Bas.

=== International boundary dispute ===
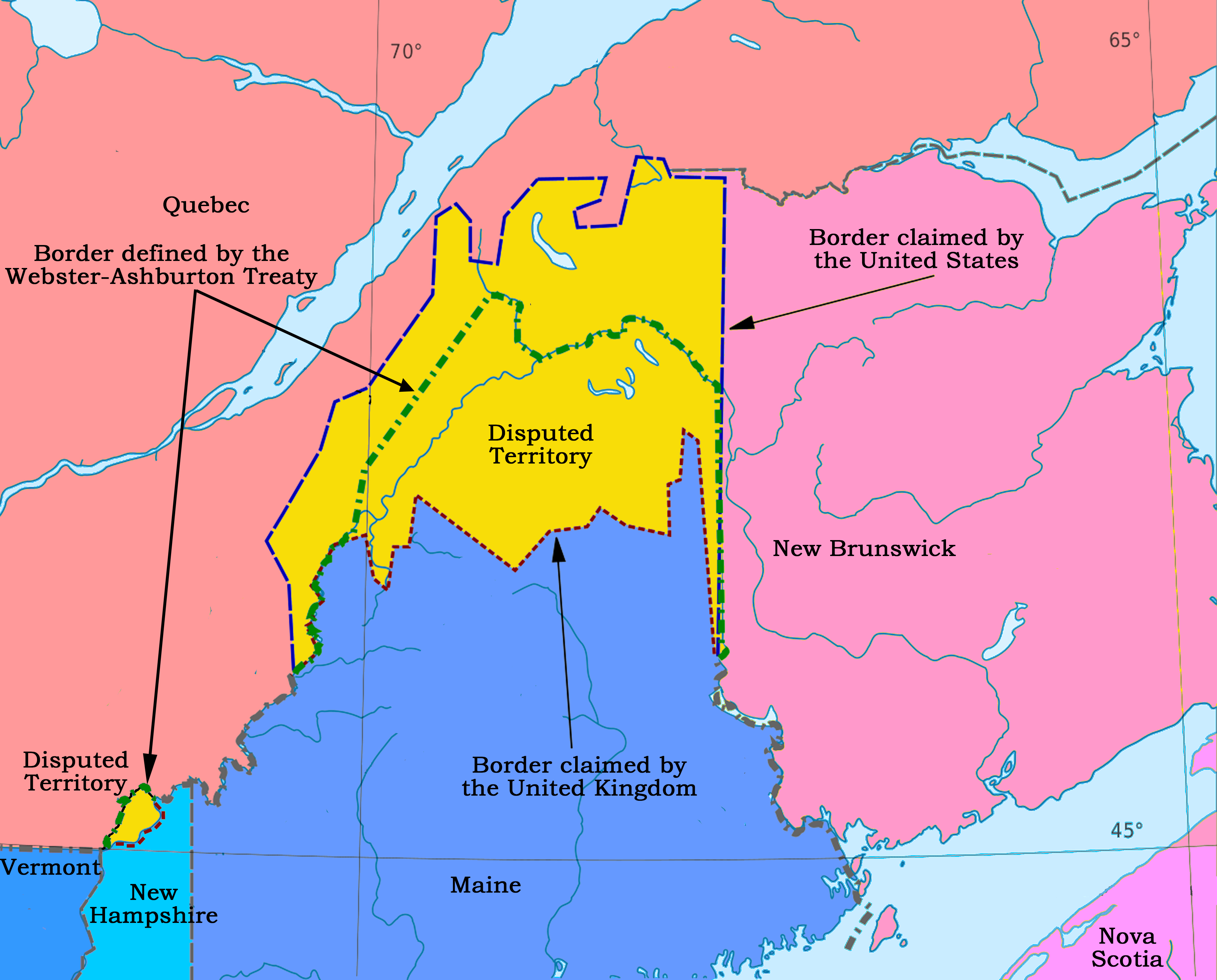
The large yellow disputed area is in the drainage of the Saint John. The international boundary established in 1842 is the dashed green line.

While the upstream Wolastoqiyik and their Acadian allies rejected both Canada and United States sovereignty after English victories in the French and Indian War, many Loyalist refugees from the American Revolutionary War resettled in Saint John at the mouth of the river and in Sainte-Anne des Pays-Bas which was renamed Fredericton. The Saint Croix River formed the Atlantic coastal boundary at the close of the war keeping the Saint John River in Canada while the Penobscot River was allocated to Massachusetts. The Treaty of Paris (1783) defined the eastern boundary of Massachusetts as a line drawn due north from the source of St. Croix River to the drainage divide of the Saint Lawrence River. Persistent hostilities with the Wolastoqiyik had prevented the English treaty signatories from mapping the river headwaters. Aside from ambiguity as to which tributary might be considered the source of the Saint Croix River, the Saint John River does not flow directly south as might have been assumed from knowledge of the better mapped Hudson and Connecticut Rivers. Of greater concern to Canada, however, was discovery of how close the drainage divide was to the south bank of the Saint Lawrence, leaving Canada with a narrow band of unfavorable terrain for construction of a road to connect Atlantic Canada to Quebec through the winter months when ice closed the Saint Lawrence. Canada chose to interpret the treaty's intention as keeping the entire Saint John drainage basin under Canadian control. Surviving Acadian and Wolastoqiyik refugees continued to resist British rule while moving upriver to the Acadian Landing Site west of the Saint Croix treaty boundary where they were joined by other Acadian refugees who had fled to Quebec. Large numbers of people began settling the area in the early 1800s, mostly Scottish and Irish, and by the end of the 1850s much of the central Saint John valley had been cleared of old-growth forest for farming. Before the advent of railways, the river was an important trade route, including timber rafting. After the state of Maine obtained independence from Massachusetts in 1820, Maine lumbermen encouraged Acadian refugees to form the independent Republic of Madawaska, and began diverting the Saint John headwaters into the Penobscot River so log driving could float timber harvested in the upper Saint John watershed to Bangor sawmills. These provocations encouraged clarification of the disputed Canada–United States border boundary by the Webster–Ashburton Treaty of 1842 which allocated the north bank of the Saint John west of the Saint Croix to Canada in exchange for some territory further west.

=== Contemporary era ===
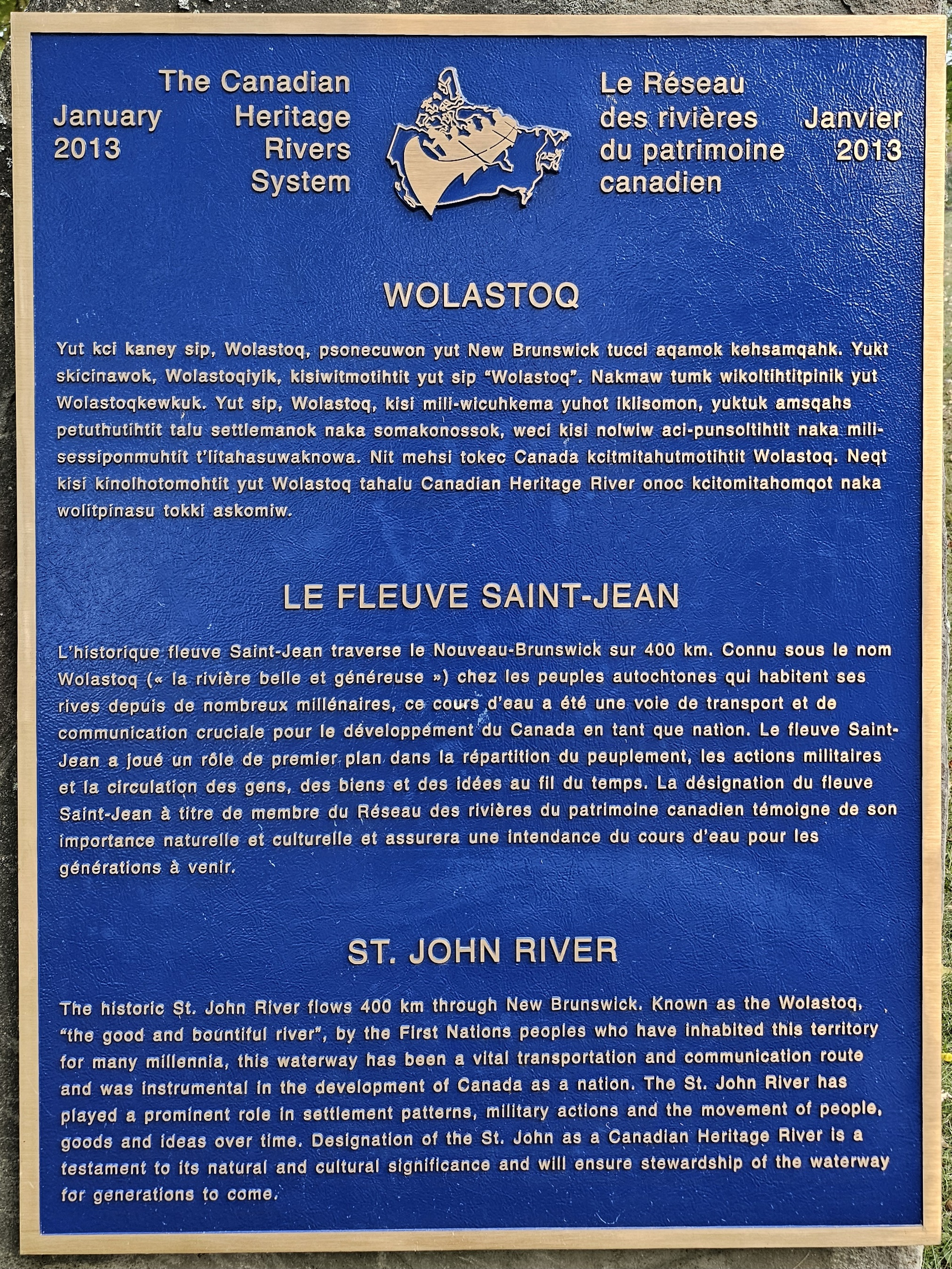
A plaque describing the river in Fredericton

Today's Trans-Canada Highway follows the route of the proposed English road along the north bank of the river through the disputed portion of the drainage. Most of the Saint John drainage on the disputed south bank became Aroostook County, Maine, where the town of Madawaska still shares the Acadian French dialect with Edmundston across the river. Historic isolation has helped preserve the dialect. The Allagash River and Baker Branch of the Saint John River upstream of Madawaska flow through the sparsely populated Maine North Woods. These black spruce forests were a primary source of pulpwood for Maine paper mills through the 20th century. Distance from Maine cities encouraged landowners to employ Quebec lumberjacks. Édouard Lacroix developed innovative transportation methods for the river headwaters including a road from Lac-Frontière, Quebec to build the isolated Eagle Lake and West Branch Railroad in 1927 and the Nine Mile Bridge over the river in 1931.

The lower river has been developed for agriculture and industry. Francophone Quebecers moved into the northern river valley. In the interwar period, many older farms were abandoned due to urbanization, and allowed to reforest. In 1925 a hydroelectric dam was built at Grand Falls, followed in 1955 by the Beechwood Dam and the Mactaquac Dam in 1965. Large reservoirs were created behind the dams. Construction of the latter two dams has caused a severe decline in migrating Atlantic salmon, and resource authorities have developed fish ladders and other measures to try to revive the migration.

The forested areas of the Maine North Woods where the river rises is mostly uninhabited. The Northwest Aroostook, Maine unorganized territory has an area of 2,668 square miles (6,910 km^{2}) and a population of 10, or one person for every 267 square miles (690 km^{2}). Increasing recreational use of the upper river encouraged designation of the Allagash Wilderness Waterway and recognition that the river supports plant communities seldom seen elsewhere. Spring snowmelt causes scouring ice jams along the upper river leaving bedrock covered by thin, patchy acidic soil supporting one of the highest concentrations of rare plants in Maine including Clinton's bulrush, Dry Land Sedge, Mistassini primrose, Nantucket shadbush, Northern Painted Cup, and Swamp Birch.

In 2011, the entire watershed was designated the Wolastoq National Historic Site, and is as the traditional territory of the Wolastoqiyik First Nation.

== Gallery ==
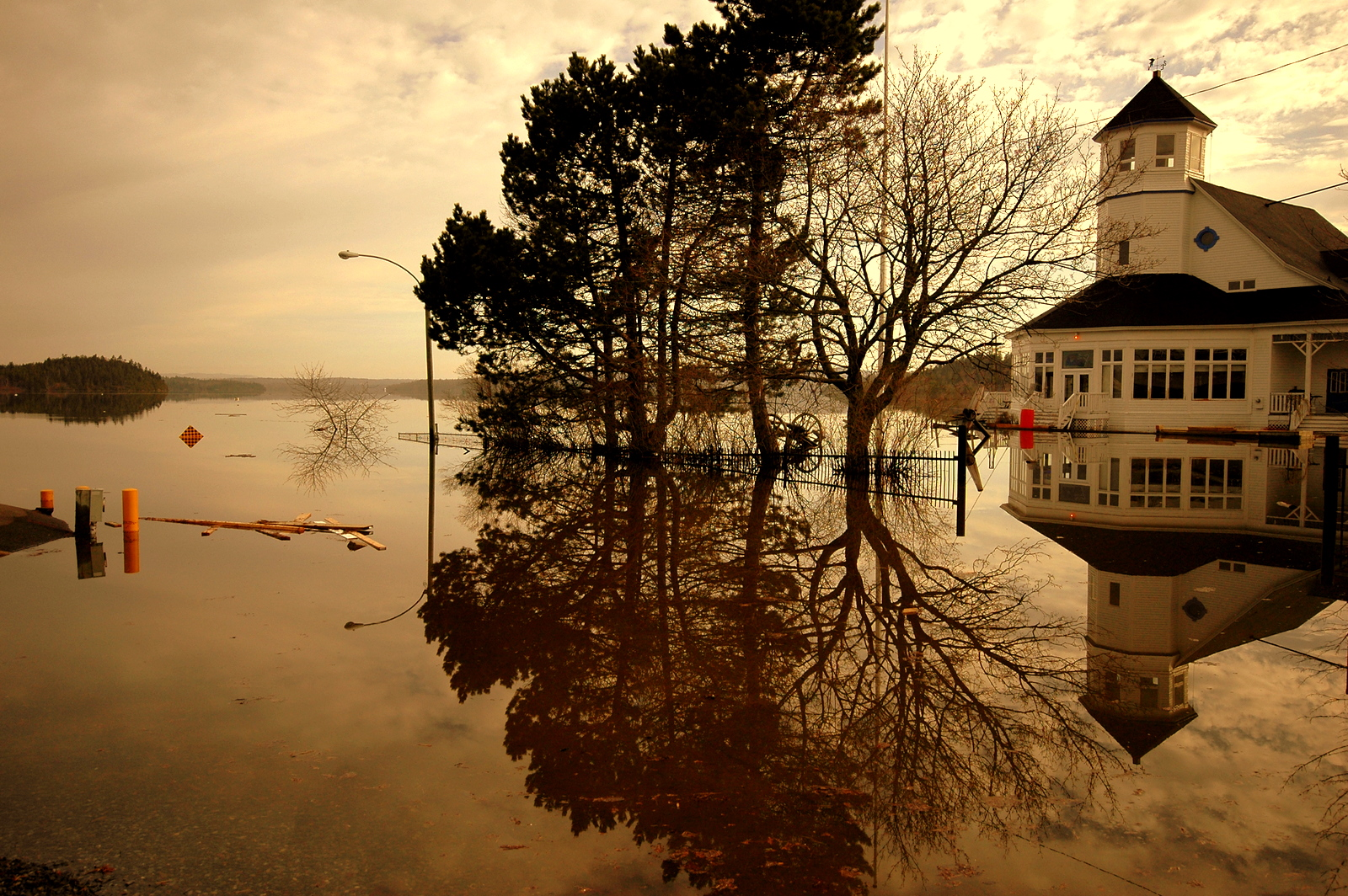
2008 Saint John River Flood

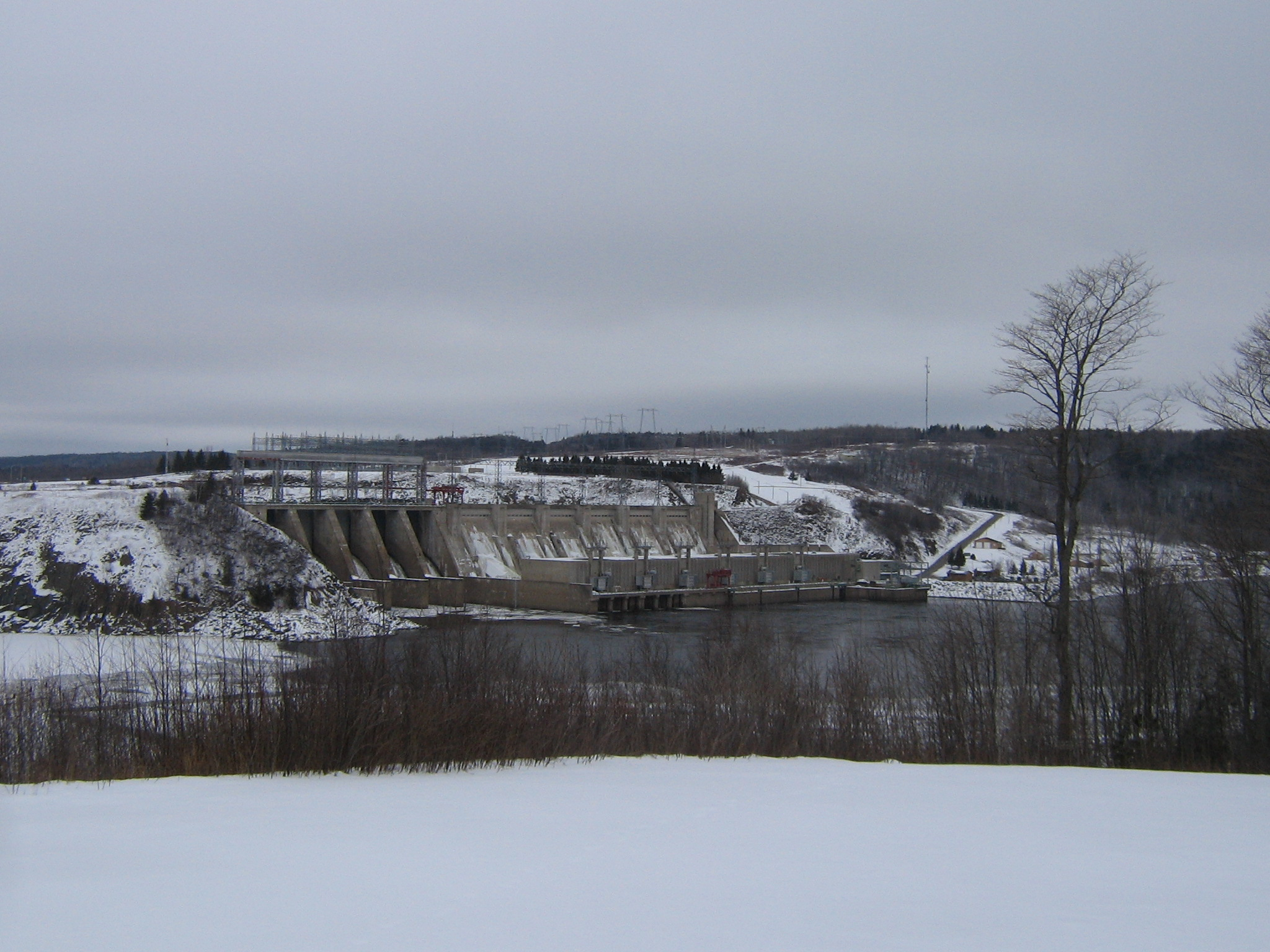
Mactaquac Dam

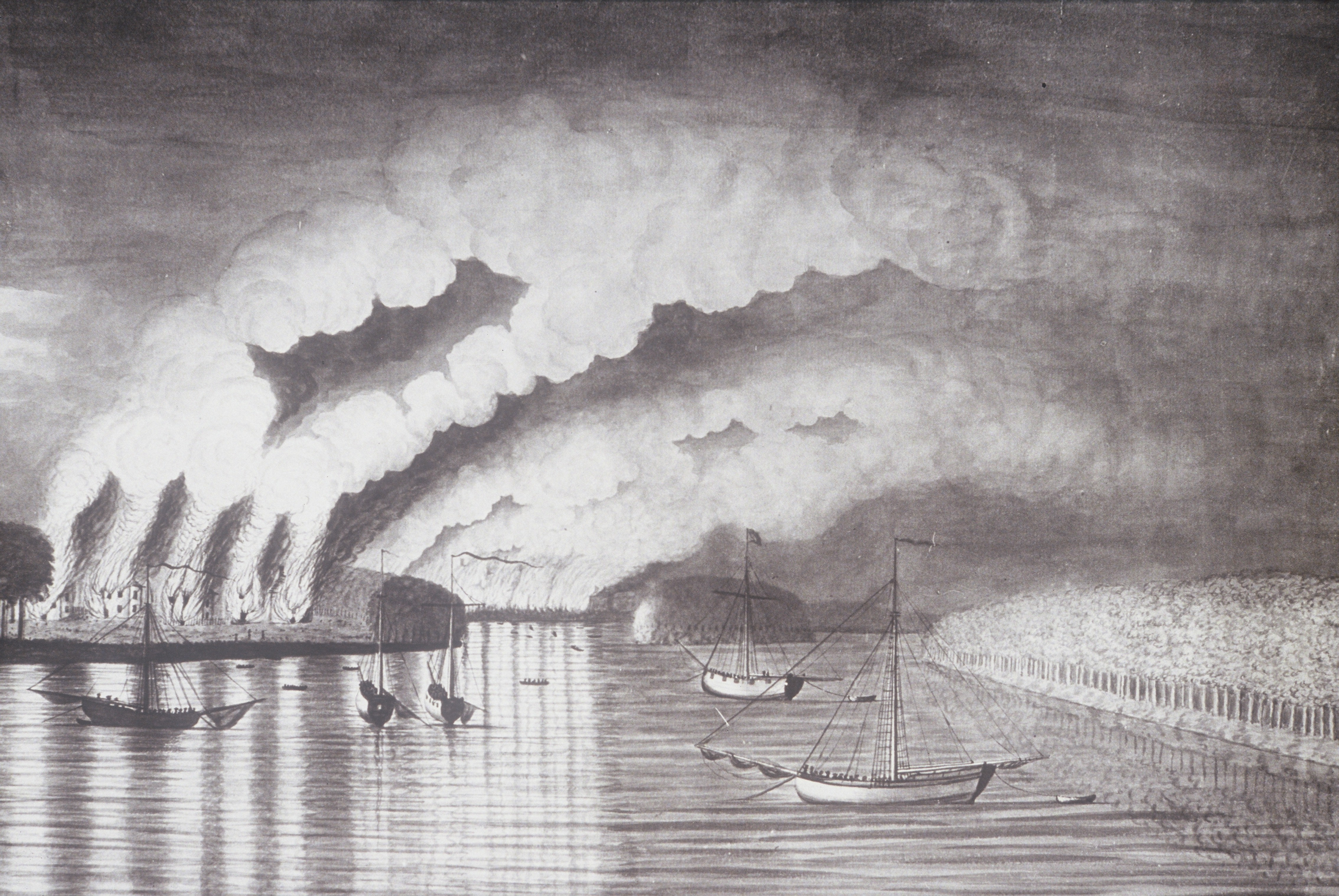
St. John River Campaign: A View of the Plundering and Burning of the City of Grimross (present day Arcadia, New Brunswick) by Thomas Davies in 1758. This is the only contemporaneous image of the Expulsion of the Acadians.

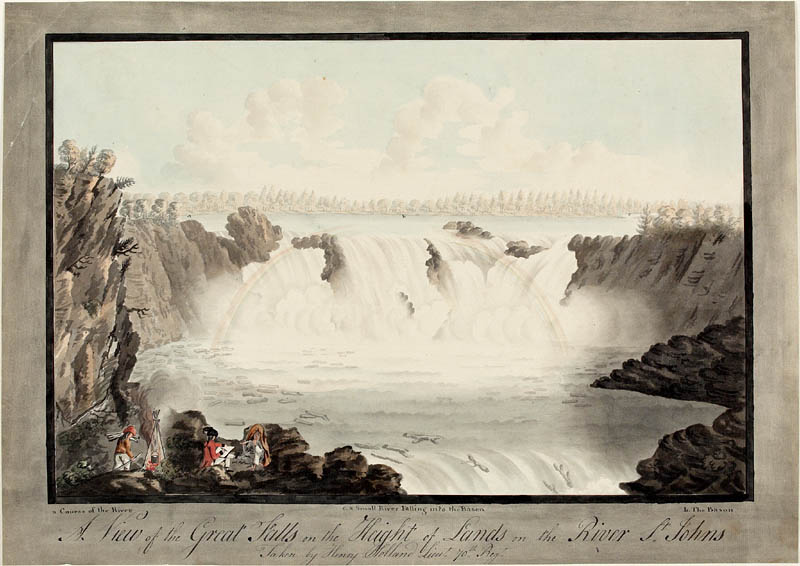
Great Falls on the River St. John, New Brunswick, by Henry Holland, c. 1782.

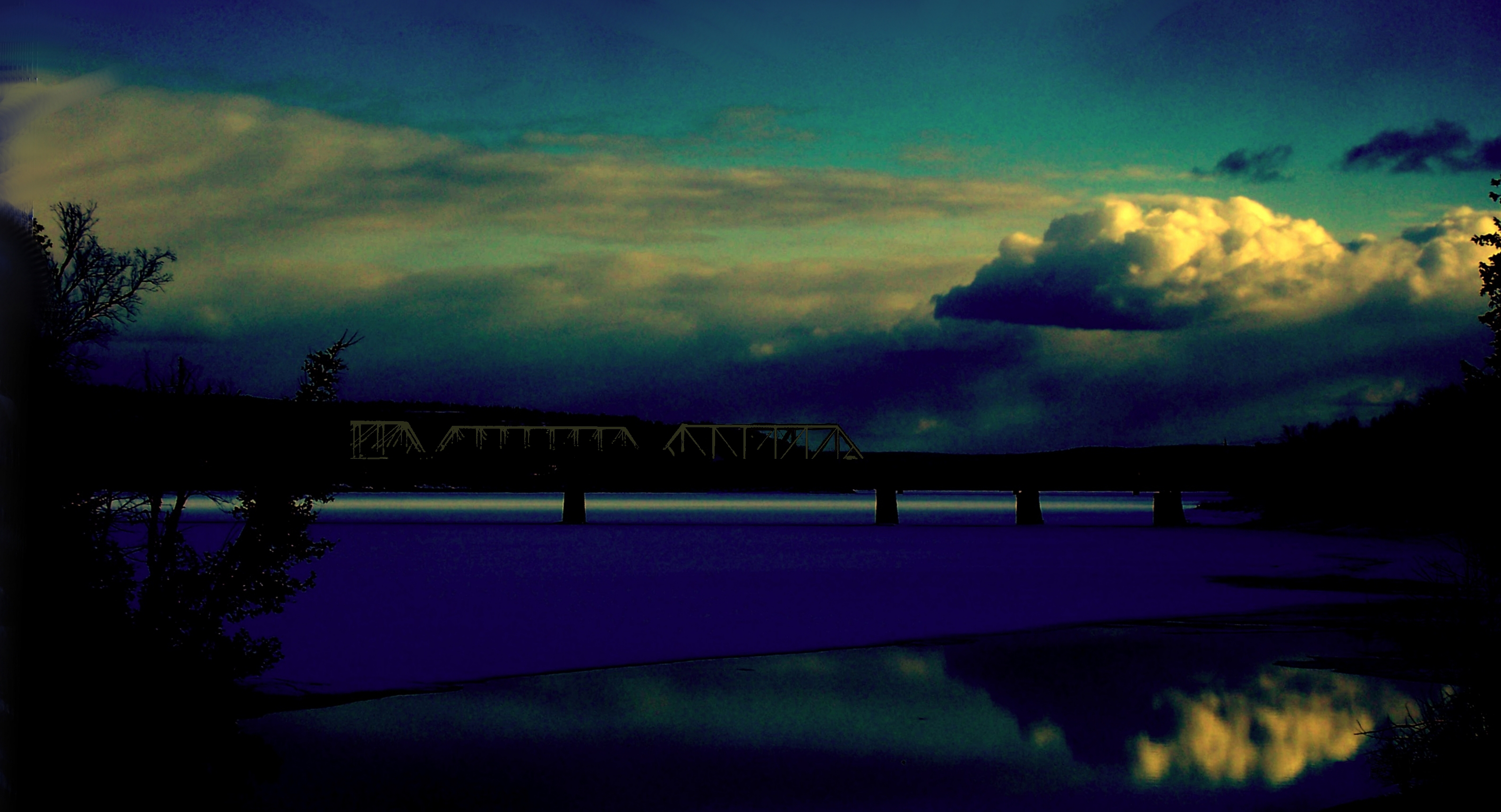
View of the railroad bridge at Woodstock looking south in Spring

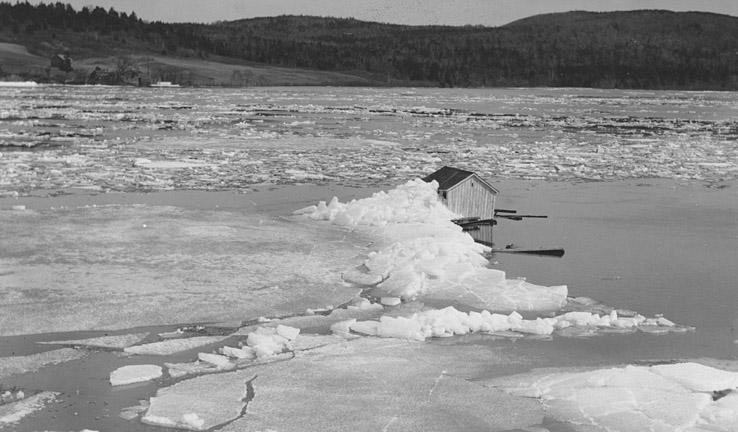
Spring freshet and ice break up near Westfield on the Saint John River, 1936

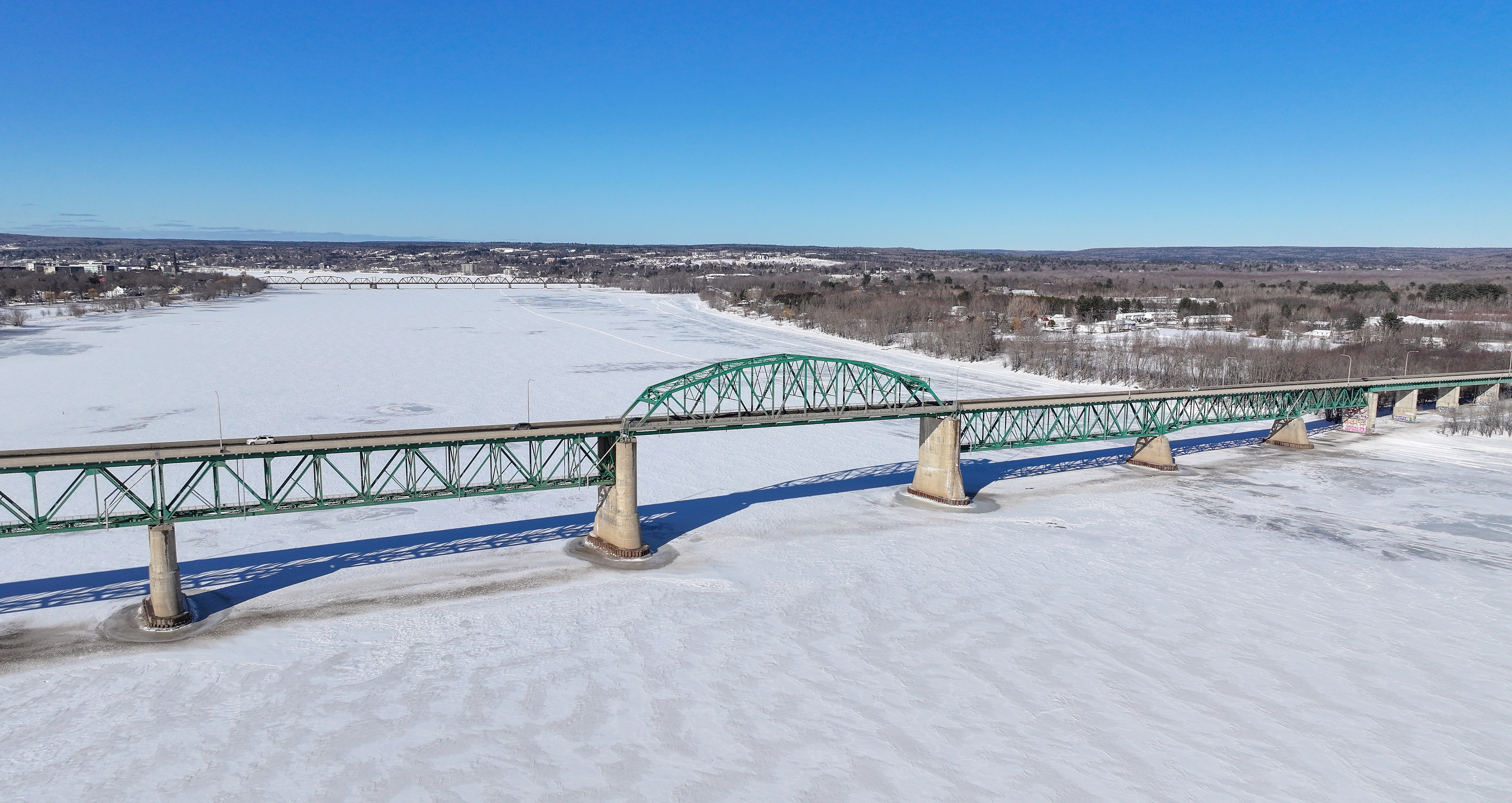
Princess Margaret Bridge (built 1959) in Fredericton

== See also ==
- List of crossings of the Saint John River
- List of longest rivers of Canada
- List of rivers of Maine
- List of bodies of water of New Brunswick
