= Seboomook Lake, Maine =

- Unorganized territory
- Location within Maine Location within the United States
- Coordinates: 45°56′N 69°52′W
- Country: United States
- State: Maine
- County: Somerset

Area
  - Total: 1,434.7 sq mi (3,715.8 km^{2})
  - Land: 1,400.9 sq mi (3,628.4 km^{2})
  - Water: 33.7 sq mi (87.4 km^{2})
- Elevation: 1,303 ft (397 m)

Population (2020)
  - Total: 23
- Time zone: UTC-5 (Eastern (EST))
  - Summer (DST): UTC-4 (EDT)
- ZIP Codes: 04478 (Rockwood); 04945 (Jackman)
- Area code: 207
- FIPS code: 23-67238
- GNIS feature ID: 582720

Seboomook Lake is an unorganized territory in Somerset County, Maine, United States. The population was 23 at the 2020 census.

== Geography ==
According to the United States Census Bureau, the unorganized territory has a total area of 3,715.8 km^{2} (1,434.7 sq mi), of which 3,628.4 km^{2} (1,400.9 sq mi) is land and 87.4 km^{2} (33.7 sq mi) (2.35%) is water.

=== Seboomook Lake ===
Seboomook Lake
- Location within Maine
- Location: Somerset County, Maine
- Coordinates: 45°56′N 69°52′W
- Primary outflows: West Branch Penobscot River
- Basin countries: United States
- Max. length: 13 mi (21 km)
- Max. width: 1 mi (1.6 km)
- Surface area: 6,880 acres (2,780 ha)
- Max. depth: 48 feet (15 m)
- Water volume: 102,195 acre⋅ft (126,056,000 m^{3})
- Surface elevation: 1,073 ft (327 m)

Seboomook Lake is a reservoir on the West Branch Penobscot River. The reservoir extends upstream from Seboomook Dam in Seboomook Township, through Plymouth Township, to the confluence of the North Branch and South Branch Penobscot River in Pittston Academy Grant.

== Townships ==
The territory consists of 39 whole townships plus portions of four other townships shared with Northeast Somerset (Brassua, Soldertown (T2 R3 NBKP), Thorndike, and Tomhegan):

- Alder Brook
- Bald Mountain (T4R3)
- Big Six
- Big Ten
- Big W
- Blake Gore
- Comstock
- Dole Brook
- Elm Stream
- Hammond
- Little W
- Pittston Academy Grant
- Plymouth
- Prentiss (T4 R4 NBKP)
- Russell Pond
- Saint John
- Sandy Bay
- Seboomook
- West Middlesex Canal Grant
- T4R5 NBKP
- T4R17 WELS
- T5R17 WELS
- T5R18 WELS
- T5R19 WELS
- T5R20 WELS
- T6R17 WELS
- T6R18 WELS
- T7R16 WELS
- T7R17 WELS
- T7R18 WELS
- T7R19 WELS
- T8R16 WELS
- T8R17 WELS
- T8R18 WELS
- T8R19 WELS
- T9R16 WELS
- T9R17 WELS
- T9R18 WELS
- T10R16 WELS

== Demographics ==
Historical population
Census	Pop.	Note	%±
1920	24		—
1940	16		—
1950	18		12.5%
1980	37		—
1990	19		−48.6%
2000	45		136.8%
2010	48		6.7%
2020	23		−52.1%
U.S. Decennial Census

At the 2000 census there were 45 people in 22 households, including 11 families, in the unorganized territory. There were 368 housing units at an average density of 0.1/km^{2} (0.26/mi^{2}). The racial makeup of the unorganized territory was 100% White. Of the 22 households 18.2% had children under the age of 18 living with them, 50% were married couples living together, 4.5% had a female householder with no husband present, and 45.5% were non-families. 40.9% of households were one person and 4.5% were one person aged 65 or older. The average household size was 2.05 and the average family size was 2.75.

The age distribution was 15.6% under the age of 18, 2.2% from 18 to 24, 20.0% from 25 to 44, 57.8% from 45 to 64, and 4.4% 65 or older. The median age was 50 years. For every 100 females, there were 150 males. For every 100 females age 18 and over, there were 137.5 males.

The median household income was $49,167 and the median family income was $61,250. Males had a median income of $46,250 versus $0 for females. The per capita income for the unorganized territory was $32,578. There were no families and 11.1% of the population living below the poverty line, including no under-eighteens and none of those over 64.

== Education ==
The Maine Department of Education takes responsibility for coordinating school assignments in the unorganized territory. As of 2025 Alder Brook, Bald Mountain, Pittston Academy Grant, Prentiss (T4 R4 NBKP), and Sandy Bay are assigned to Greenville Consolidated School. As of that year, the department does not give school information regarding Comstock, Dole Brook, Elm Stream, Hammond, and Russell Pond on its website.
