= Great Northern Paper Company =

Pulp and paper manufacturer

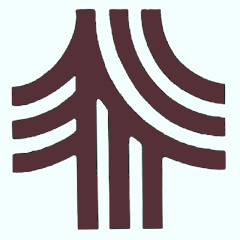

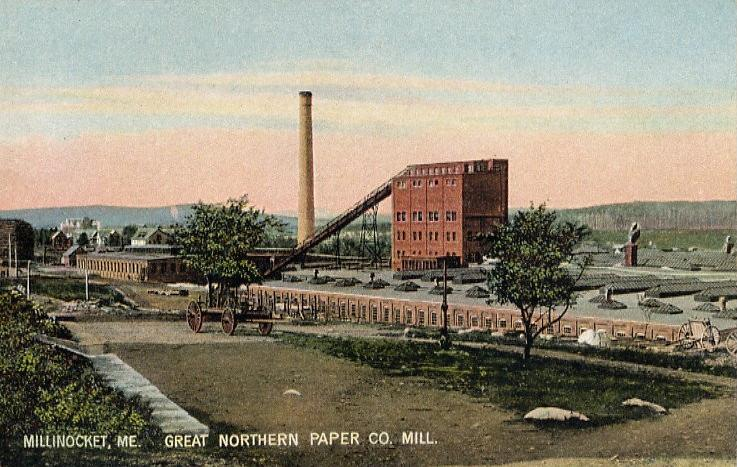
- Great Northern Paper Company mill in Millinocket, Maine, 1907
- Formerly: Northern Development Company
- Type: Private
- Industry: Pulp and Paper Mill
- Founded: 1897 in Millinocket, Penobscot County, Maine, USA
- Founders: Charles W. Mullen and Garret Schenck
- Defunct: August 2014
- Area served: Many US States
- Products: Paper

Great Northern Paper Company was a Maine-based pulp and paper manufacturer that at its peak in the 1970s and 1980s operated mills in Arkansas, Georgia, Maine, and Wisconsin and produced 16.4% of the newsprint made in the United States. It was also one of the largest landowners in the state of Maine.

The company was acquired by Georgia-Pacific Corporation in 1990. Its name was revived in 2011 when private equity firm Cate Street Capital acquired Great Northern's original Maine mills.

== History ==
=== Maine ===
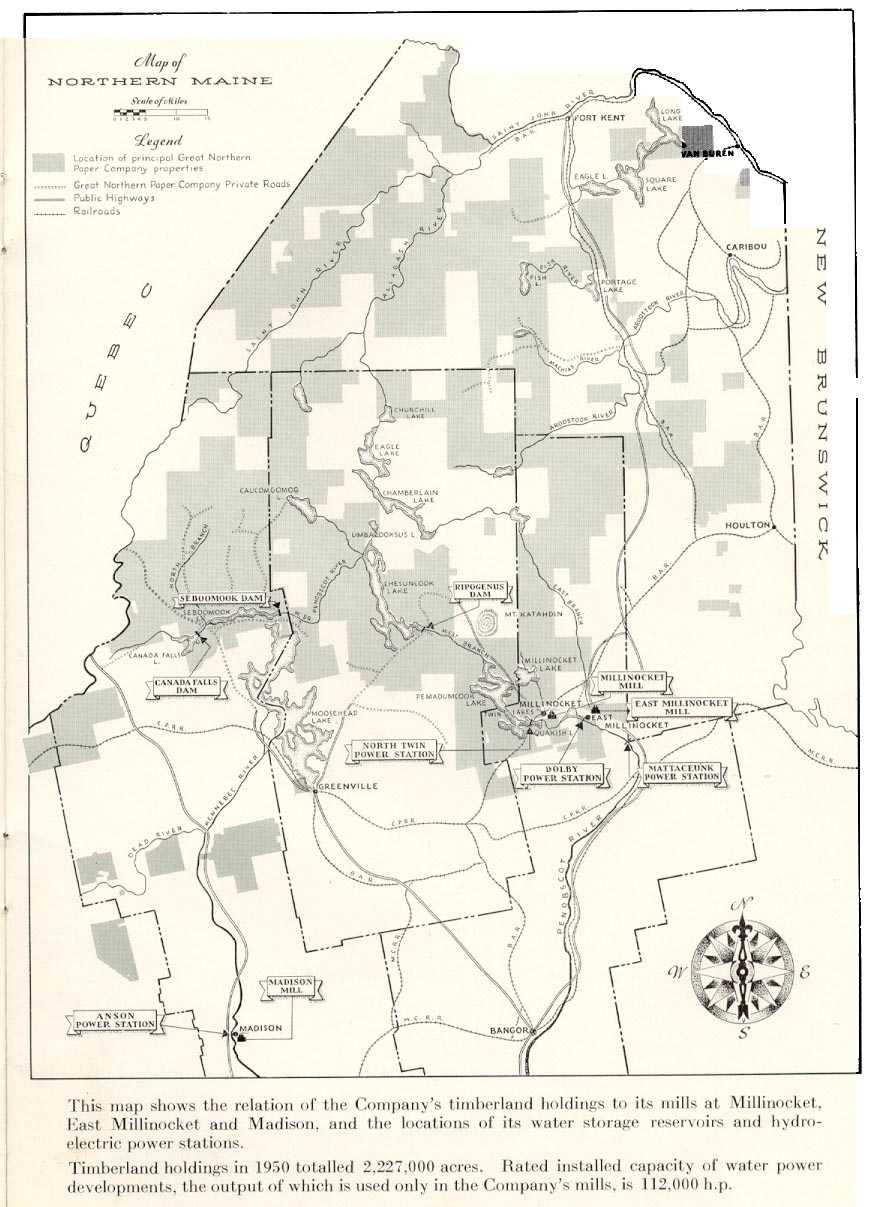
Map of Great Northern Paper Company's timberland holdings in 1950.

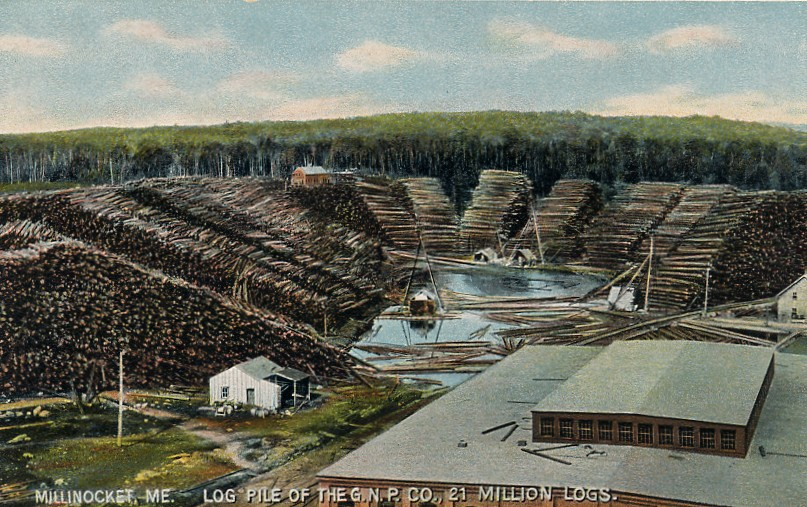
Great Northern Paper Company log pile in Millinocket (1908).

The company got its start when the Maine legislature authorized Charles W. Mullen to form a water power company on the West Branch Penobscot River. Mullen had observed the 110-foot (34 m) drop of the West Branch Penobscot River at Grand Falls in 1891 while surveying a route for the Bangor and Aroostook Railroad. He later worked with Garret Schenck, part owner of the Rumford Falls Paper Company, to build a paper mill in Millinocket, Penobscot County, Maine on the river. Schenck formed the Northern Development Company in 1897.

The Millinocket plant produced its first roll of newsprint on 9 November 1900. A second mill in Madison opened in 1906. A third one opened in East Millinocket in 1907, which also had its own dam and hydroelectric facility. Financiers of the corporation included Oliver Payne and William Collins Whitney.

When the Millinocket Mill opened it was the world's largest paper mill, producing 240 tons/day of newsprint, 120 tons/day of sulfite pulp, and 240 tons/day of groundwood pulp. It was the first paper mill to have an electrical generation and distribution facility built into the plant. The company's innovations included a pulpwood grinding machine still known throughout the paper industry as Great Northern grinders.

Entering the 20th century, Great Northern had a fleet of four coastal-water steam ships - as well as many small barges - it used to transport logs, pulp, and paper from Searsport, Maine, to New York and its surrounding harbors, and transport coal and sulfur back to Maine. These ships were used for several decades before their age and increased cost made them obsolete. Beginning in the mid-20th century, Great Northern acquired and began construction on various smaller boats to use on inland rivers and lakes. These boats were intended to lower the cost of the increasingly-unpopular Penobscot River log drives.

In the 1910s Great Northern built the Ripogenus Dam and power plant on the West Branch of the Penobscot River. Construction of a thermal power plant in 1958 raised the total generating capacity of the Millinocket mill complex to 200,000 horsepower (150,000 kW). High-pressure steam generated by burning waste bark was routed first through generator turbines, and the low-pressure exhaust steam was then used to dry the paper. Mid-20th-century paper production of 1,000 tonnes per day was sold to 250 newspapers east of the Mississippi River.

In 1930 the company sold 6,000 acres (24 km^{2}) around Maine's highest point, Mount Katahdin, for $25,000 to former Maine Governor Percival Proctor Baxter. In turn Baxter donated the land to the state, for what became the present-day Baxter State Park.

In the 1940s its timber holdings increased to more than 2 million acres and its workforce was supplemented during World War II by a prisoner of war camp at Seboomook Farm near Moosehead Lake.

=== 20th century mergers and acquisitions ===
In 1962, the Great Northern Paper Company expanded to Jakin, Georgia, where it formed a subsidiary named the Great Southern Land and Paper Company. It produced linerboard and corrugating medium.

In 1970, the Great Northern Paper Company merged with the Nekoosa-Edwards Paper Company in Port Edwards, Wisconsin, and was renamed the Great Northern Nekoosa Corporation. New mills were built in Arkansas and Mississippi.

In 1971, the company completed construction of the 97-mile Golden Road in Maine that paralleled the West Branch of the Penobscot River from Quebec to its mill at Millinocket. It ended the practice of floating logs down the river via log driving, and instead shipped them by truck.

In 1989, Georgia-Pacific launched a hostile takeover of the company which closed in 1990 for $3.8 billion. Georgia-Pacific in turn sold the Maine holdings to Bowater in 1991.

In 1999, Inexcon, a Canadian company, acquired the Maine holdings.

== 21st century ==
The Inexcon holdings in Maine went into bankruptcy in 2002. They were acquired by Brascan Corporation in April 2003 and operated under the name of Katahdin Paper Company LLC. In 2003 Brookfield Asset Management bought the mills after the company filed for bankruptcy. That company continued its decline, laying off workers in 2008.

In 2011 the Katahdin Paper Company LLC holdings in Maine were acquired by Cate Street Capital of Portsmouth, New Hampshire. They revived the Great Northern Paper name. The mill at East Millinocket was launched again although with diminished output. The purchase by Cate Street was seen as a positive alternative to the closing of the mill at a time when the region was experiencing 22% unemployment.

The Millinocket mill was never reopened, but for a while it seemed that the East Millinocket mill could improve its financial status. Within the year of the Cate Street purchase and the reopening of the East Millinocket mill over 250 people had been hired.

Just one year later the mill was called upon to supply the paper needed to produce the popular trilogy Fifty Shades of Grey. The mill's output that year was 3,000 tons of paper, mostly for the three-part novel, which was printed on Great Northern's Baxter Brite paper.

In 2013 Cate Street Capital announced plans to tear down virtually all the mill buildings at the Millinocket plant, and replace them with structures to operate a Torrefaction wood operation, under the name of its subsidiary Thermogen Industries.

In 2014 the over-100-year-old paper mill was forced to close down its operations. Originally the company and workers were hopeful that the closure would be temporary. However, when the company sent out notices under the WARN Act (Workers Adjustment and Retraining Notification Act) to its workers in August, 2014, the closure could only be understood as permanent. At the time of the bankruptcy Great Northern listed over 1,000 creditors in its filing.

An investigation done by the Maine Sunday Telegram uncovered that a majority of the $40 million investment in the Great Northern Paper mill was "returned the same day to investors." The investors are receiving $16 million from Maine's General Fund over seven years. The research showed that neither the $31.8 million loan nor the $8.2 million equity investment was used to pay for improvements to the mill.

On January 12, 2017, Our Katahdin, a 501(c)3 non-profit organization based in the Katahdin region, purchased all remaining former Great Northern Paper Company assets in Millinocket through the sale of two subsidiaries of Cate Street Capital, GNP West and GNP Holding II.

On July 21, 2020, the town of East Millinocket purchased the Great Northern Paper site for $1.45 million, and on February 10, 2021, a portion of the mill site was leased out to Standard Biocarbon Corp. to build a pyrolysis facility to convert low-grade biomass into biocarbon.

== See also ==
- Papermaking in the United States
- Pulp and paper companies of the United States
