= Boucanée River =

Boucanée River Rivière Boucanée

Location
- Country: Canada
- Province: Quebec
- Administrative region: Bas-Saint-Laurent

Physical characteristics
- Source
  - location: Saint-Honoré-de-Témiscouata, Quebec
  - coordinates: 47°27′21″N 69°26′56″W
  - elevation: 497 metres (1,631 ft)
- Mouth
  - location: Lake Pohenegamook (Quebec)
  - coordinates: 47°30′13″N 69°17′07″W
  - elevation: 202 metres (663 ft)
- Length: 16.1 km (10.0 mi)

Basin features
- Tributaries
  - left: (from the mouth) Discharge of « Lac au Foin » and « Lac Alphonse ».

The Boucanée River (French: Rivière Boucanée, translation to English: Smoked River) is a tributary of the lake Pohenegamook, flowing in the southern part of the Gaspé Peninsula, in the municipalities of Saint-Athanase, Quebec and Pohénégamook, Quebec, in Témiscouata Regional County Municipality (RCM), in the administrative region of Bas-Saint-Laurent, in Quebec, in Canada.

The "Boucanée River" flows on the western bank of Lake Pohenegamook, which is the largest lake on the course of the Saint Francis River (Canada-United States). It spills on the north bank of the Saint Francis River (Canada-United States). The latter in turn flows to the south, crossing the Beau Lake (Maine-Quebec), then towards the southeast across Lake Glacier to the north shore of St. John River to New Brunswick. It flows first to the east, then south-east through all the New Brunswick and pours on the north bank of the Bay of Fundy which is open to the southwest on the Atlantic Ocean.

The course of the Boucanée River is accessible by "chemin de la Rivière-Noire" (English: road of the Black River) and the route 289.

== Geography ==
The Boucanée River rises at the mouth of Lake Boucané (length: 0.7 kilometres (0.43 mi); height: 497 metres (1,631 ft)) in the municipality of Saint-Athanase, Quebec in Notre Dame Mountains.

This source is located at:

- 3.0 kilometres (1.9 mi) northwest from the village center of Saint-Athanase, Quebec;
- 5.6 kilometres (3.5 mi) south-eastern limit of the Kamouraska Regional County Municipality (RCM);
- 5.0 kilometres (3.1 mi) southwest of "Lac des Huards" (English: lake of Loons);
- 13.2 kilometres (8.2 mi) north of the confluence of the "Boucanée River".

From its source, the "Boucanée River" flows over 16.1 kilometres (10.0 mi) according to the following segments:

- 0.8 kilometres (0.50 mi) to the southeast in the municipality of Saint-Athanase, Quebec, to the bridge of the "chemin de la Rivière-Noire" (English: road of the Black River);
- 4.5 kilometres (2.8 mi) to the northeast, to the bridge path rank Tom Fox;
- 1.6 kilometres (0.99 mi) to the southeast, to the boundary of the municipality of Pohenegamook, Quebec;
- 1.0 kilometre (0.62 mi) to the northeast, to the outlet of "lac au Foin" (English: Lake Hay) and Alphonse Lake (from the north);
- 3.8 kilometres (2.4 mi) to the northeast, to the railway bridge Canadian National;
- 1.6 kilometres (0.99 mi) to the Northeast, cutting twice the path of "rang Ignace-Nadeau" (English: range Ignace Nadeau), until "ruisseau des Cèdres" (English: Cedars stream) (from the West);
- 2.8 kilometres (1.7 mi) eastward, cutting the Route 289 (Main Street), passing south of the "Montagne de la Croix" (English: Mountain of the Cross) and cutting the road to the "Tête-du-Lac" (English: Lac-head) (i.e. the road to the west shore of Lake Pohenegamook), to the confluence of the river.

The "Boucanée river" flows on the western shore of Lake Pohenegamook to Pohenegamook, Quebec. The confluence of the "Boucanée River" is in the western part of the Saint-Elzéar-de-Témiscouata, Quebec. This confluence is located:

- 1.6 kilometres (0.99 mi) north of the village center of Saint-Éleuthère, Quebec;
- 2.6 kilometres (1.6 mi) south of the main source of Lake Pohenegamook;
- 6.5 kilometres (4.0 mi) northwest of the mouth of the Lake Pohenegamook.

== Toponymy ==
The French term "Boucanée" (English: smoked) is linked to the lake and the river. This term refers to the preservation of meat by smoking over the fire, normally under a shelter, giving flavor to the meat.

The place name "Boucanée River" was formalized on December 5, 1968, at the Commission de toponymie du Québec (Quebec Geographical Names Board).

== Boucanée River Viaduct ==
In 1913 Boucanée River Viaduct was built for the National Transcontinental Railway near Rivieres du Loup, Quebec by designer Philip Louis Pratley.

== See also ==
- Témiscouata Regional County Municipality (RCM)
- Saint-Athanase, Quebec, a municipality
- Pohenegamook, Quebec, a municipality
- Saint Francis River (Canada-United States), a stream
- Saint John River (Bay of Fundy), a stream
- List of rivers of Quebec
