= Pocwock River =

Pocwock Stream

Location
- Countries: Canada, United States
- States: Quebec, Maine

Physical characteristics
- Source
  - location: Mont-Carmel, Quebec, Kamouraska Regional County Municipality, Bas-Saint-Laurent, Quebec
  - coordinates: 47°11′25″N 69°30′46″W
  - elevation: 496 metres (1,627 ft)
- Mouth
  - location: Township T16 R12 WELS, Aroostook County, Maine, United States
  - coordinates: 47°03′58″N 69°17′51″W
  - elevation: 210 metres (690 ft)
- Length: 36.7 km (22.8 mi)

Basin features
- Tributaries
  - left: (from the confluence) East Branch Pocwock Stream, West Branch Pocwock Stream

The Pocwock Stream is a tributary of the Saint John River (Bay of Fundy), flowing in:

- Quebec (Canada) in the administrative region of Bas-Saint-Laurent, in Kamouraska Regional County Municipality, in municipality of Mount Carmel. Note: In Quebec, the river is designated "Pocwock stream";
- Maine (United States) in the Aroostook County, in townships T17 R14 Wels, T17 R13 Wels and T16 R12 Wels.

Its course runs, especially in Maine, entirely in forested region in an isolated mountain valley, to the southeast of the Canada–US border. Its course is located between the Fox Creek (east side) and the Chimenticook River (west side). The watershed of the Pocwock river is accessible by some forest roads.

Pocwock Stream empties on north shore of Saint John River (Bay of Fundy). The latter serpentines eastward, then south-east, crossing all the province of New Brunswick, and empties on the north shore of the Bay of Fundy, which is open to the south-west to the Atlantic Ocean.

== Geography ==
The upper part of the River Pocwock begins in Notre Dame Mountains, in the municipality of Mont-Carmel, Quebec, in Kamouraska Regional County Municipality, in Quebec. This source is located at:

- 0.8 kilometres (0.50 mi) northwest of the border between Quebec and Maine;
- 2.1 kilometres (1.3 mi) northeast of East Lake (municipality of Mount Carmel);
- 19.9 kilometres (12.4 mi) northwest from the confluence of the river Pocwock;
- 46.3 kilometres (28.8 mi) southeast of the route 132 at La Pocatière, Quebec, in Quebec.

From the source in the mountains, the river Pocwock flows 36.7 kilometres (22.8 mi) as follows:

- 1.1 kilometres (0.68 mi) to the south in Mount Carmel, to the border between Quebec and Maine;
- 16.2 kilometres (10.1 mi) to the southeast in the Maine until the West Branch River Powock (English: West Branch Powock Stream);
- 2.4 kilometres (1.5 mi) to the southeast, to a stream (from the north);
- 10.0 kilometres (6.2 mi) to the southeast, to the East Branch Powock River (English: East Branch Powock Stream);
- 7.0 kilometres (4.3 mi) to the southeast, to the confluence of the river

The "Pocwock River" flows into a river curve on the north shore of Saint John River (Bay of Fundy), in township T16 R12 Wels, in the Aroostook County. This confluence is located:

- 20.6 kilometres (12.8 mi) west of the Allagash hamlet, located on the south shore of Saint John River (Bay of Fundy);
- 4.7 kilometres (2.9 mi) downstream of the confluence of the Chimenticook River;
- 22.0 kilometres (13.7 mi) downstream of the confluence of the Big Black River;
- 15.4 kilometres (9.6 mi) southwest of the confluence of the Little Black River (Saint John River).

== Toponymy ==
The term Pocwock is associated with West Branch Pocwock Stream and East Branch Pocwock Stream. In Québec, the spelling of the river's name uses the letter 'k' in the middle, or "Pockwock"; the spelling "Pocwock" (without the letter k in the middle) is used by the GNIS (Geographic Names Information System) in the US.

The place name "ruisseau Pockwock" (English: Pockwock brook) was formalized on December 5, 1968, at the Commission de toponymie du Québec (Quebec Geographical Names Board).

== See also ==
- East Branch Pocwock River, a stream
- List of rivers of Quebec
- List of rivers of Maine
