= Campbell Branch Little Black River =

Location
- Countries: Canada; United States

Physical characteristics
- Source
  - location: Quebec
  - elevation: 558 metres (1,831 ft)
- Mouth
  - location: Little Black River
  - coordinates: 47°15′48″N 69°21′02″W
  - elevation: 242 metres (794 ft)
- Length: 20.4 km (12.7 mi)
- Discharge
  - location: Aroostook County, Maine

The Campbell Branch Little Black River is a short river in Quebec (Canada) and northern Maine (United States).

Campbell Branch Little Black River is a tributary of Little Black River (Saint John River) which flows East, than Southeast crossing the province of New Brunswick up to the North shore of Bay of Fundy. The latest is open to Southwest to Atlantic Ocean.

== Geography ==
From its source (47°14′53″N 69°27′55″W), in Picard (unorganized territory), in Kamouraska RCM, Quebec, the river runs about 2.4 kilometres (1.5 mi) southeast to the Canada–United States border in Maine Township 18, Range 13, WELS.

From the Canada–United States border, the "Campbell Branch Little Black River" runs on 20.4 kilometres (12.7 mi) east, south, and around a loop to the northeast to the Little Black River. The course of the river runs:

- 4.3 kilometres (2.7 mi) east, then south-east, up to a brook (from north);
- 2.9 kilometres (1.8 mi) south, then east, up to the discharge of a lake (from south-eest);
- 10.8 kilometres (6.7 mi) northeast up to the confluence.

Campbell Branch Little Black River empties on the west shore in a bend of the Little Black River (Saint John River). This confluence is located at:

- 0.2 kilometres (0.12 mi) downstream of West Branch Little Black River (Quebec–Maine).
- 23.4 kilometres (14.5 mi) at the northeast of the confluence of Little Black River (Saint John River).

== See also ==
- Picard, Quebec, an unorganized territory
- Aroostook County, a county of Maine
- Kamouraska Regional County Municipality (RCM)
- West Branch Little Black River
- Saint John River (Bay of Fundy)
- List of rivers of Maine
- List of rivers of Quebec
