= East Branch Pocwock Stream =

East Branch Pockwock Stream

Location
- Country: United States
- States: Maine
- Region: North Maine Woods

Physical characteristics
- Source
  - location: Mountain stream, Township T17 R13 WELS, Aroostook County, North Maine Woods, Maine, United States
  - coordinates: 47°10′23″N 69°22′58″W
  - elevation: 363 metres (1,191 ft)
- Mouth
  - location: Pocwock River, Township T16 R13 WELS, Aroostook County, North Maine Woods, Maine, United States
  - coordinates: 47°05′11″N 69°21′06″W
  - elevation: 223 metres (732 ft)
- Length: 16.1 km (10.0 mi)

The East Branch Pockwock Stream (French: Branche Est de la rivière Pocwock) is a tributary of the Pocwock River, flowing in Townships T17 R13 Wels and T16 R13 Wels, in the Aroostook County, in North Maine Woods, in Maine, the United States.

Its course runs entirely in forested region in an isolated valley surrounded by mountains.

The "Eastern Branch of the Pockwock river" empties on the East bank of the Pocwock River which flows Southeast up to a river bend of Saint John River. The latest flows to the East, then Southeast through all the New Brunswick and pours on the North bank of the Bay of Fundy which opens to the Southwest on the Atlantic Ocean.

The river side of "East Branch of Pocwock stream" is accessible by some forest roads.

== Geography ==
The course of the "Eastern Branch of the river Pocwock" begins at the feet of a mountain (East side) in Notre Dame Mountains, Township T17 R13 WELS, in the North Maine Woods, in the Maine. This source is located at:

- 8.2 kilometres (5.1 mi) Southeast of the border between Quebec and Maine;
- 10.4 kilometres (6.5 mi) Southeast of Eastern Lake (Kamouraska);
- 9.7 kilometres (6.0 mi) Northwest from the confluence of the "East Branch of the Pocwock River";
- 7.7 kilometres (4.8 mi) West of the top of the "Rocky Mountain" (top level at 602 metres (1,975 ft)).

From the source located at the foot of a mountain, the "Eastern Branch of the Pockwock river" flowing over 16.1 kilometres (10.0 mi) as follows:

- 1.9 kilometres (1.2 mi) to the Northeast on the Maine up to a stream (from the Northeast);
- 12.0 kilometres (7.5 mi) to the South in a small timber plain up to a stream (from the North);
- 2.2 kilometres (1.4 mi) to the South in a small timber plain up to the confluence of the river.

The "Eastern Branch of the Pocwock River" flows on the East bank of the Pocwock River, Township T17 R14 Wels, in the Aroostook County. This confluence is located:

- 14.7 kilometres (9.1 mi) to the Southeast of the Canada-US border;
- 4.5 kilometres (2.8 mi) Northwest from the confluence of the Pocwock River.

== Toponymy ==
The term "Pocwock" is associated with the Pocwock River and West Branch Pocwock Stream.

== See also ==
- Aroostook County, a county Maine
- Pocwock River, a stream
- Saint John River (Bay of Fundy), a stream
- North Maine Woods, a geographical region of Maine
- List of rivers of Maine

== Bibliography ==
- "East Branch of Pocwock River". Geographic Names Information System. United States Geological Survey, United States Department of the Interior. September 30, 1980.
