= Estcourt Station–Pohénégamook Border Crossing =

Canada–United States border crossing

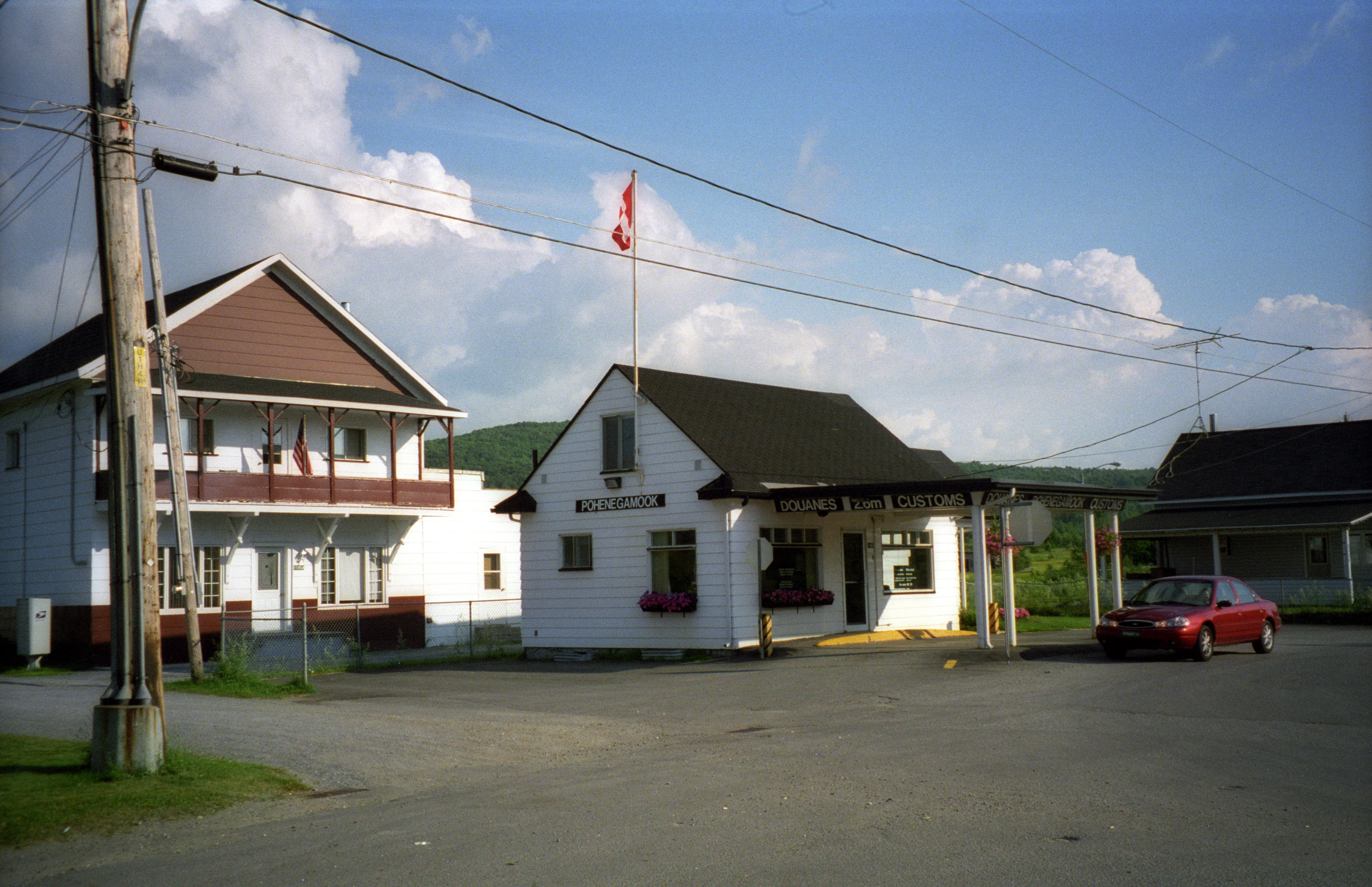
- Canada Border Inspection Station at Pohénégamook, Québec

Locaiton
- Country: United States; Canada
- Location: Along Frontier Road / Rue de la Frontière in the Estcourt Station - Pohénégamook area. US Port is at the south end of the area; Canadian port is in the center.; US Port: 1275 Rue de la Frontière, Estcourt Station, ME 04741; Canadian Port: 1187 Rue de la Frontière, Pohénégamook, Québec G0L 1J0
- Coordinates: 47.449807°N 69.234778°W

Details
- Opened: 1952

Website
- https://www.cbp.gov/contact/ports/fort-kent-maine-0110

The Estcourt Station–Pohénégamook Border Crossing connects the villages of Estcourt Station, Maine and Pohénégamook, Quebec on the Canada–US border. It is the easternmost border crossing in Quebec. The crossing is essentially a single small town divided by an international boundary. Several of the buildings are bisected by the boundary line. The US border station is located on the south end of town, where a road with access to other parts of Maine is located. The Canada border station is in the centre of town, where the railroad underpass provides access to other parts of Canada. On the north end of Estcourt, there is an international pedestrian footbridge that crosses the St. Francis River.

== See also ==
- List of Canada–United States border crossings
