= Saint Francis River (Canada–United States) =

River forming part of the Canada–US boundary

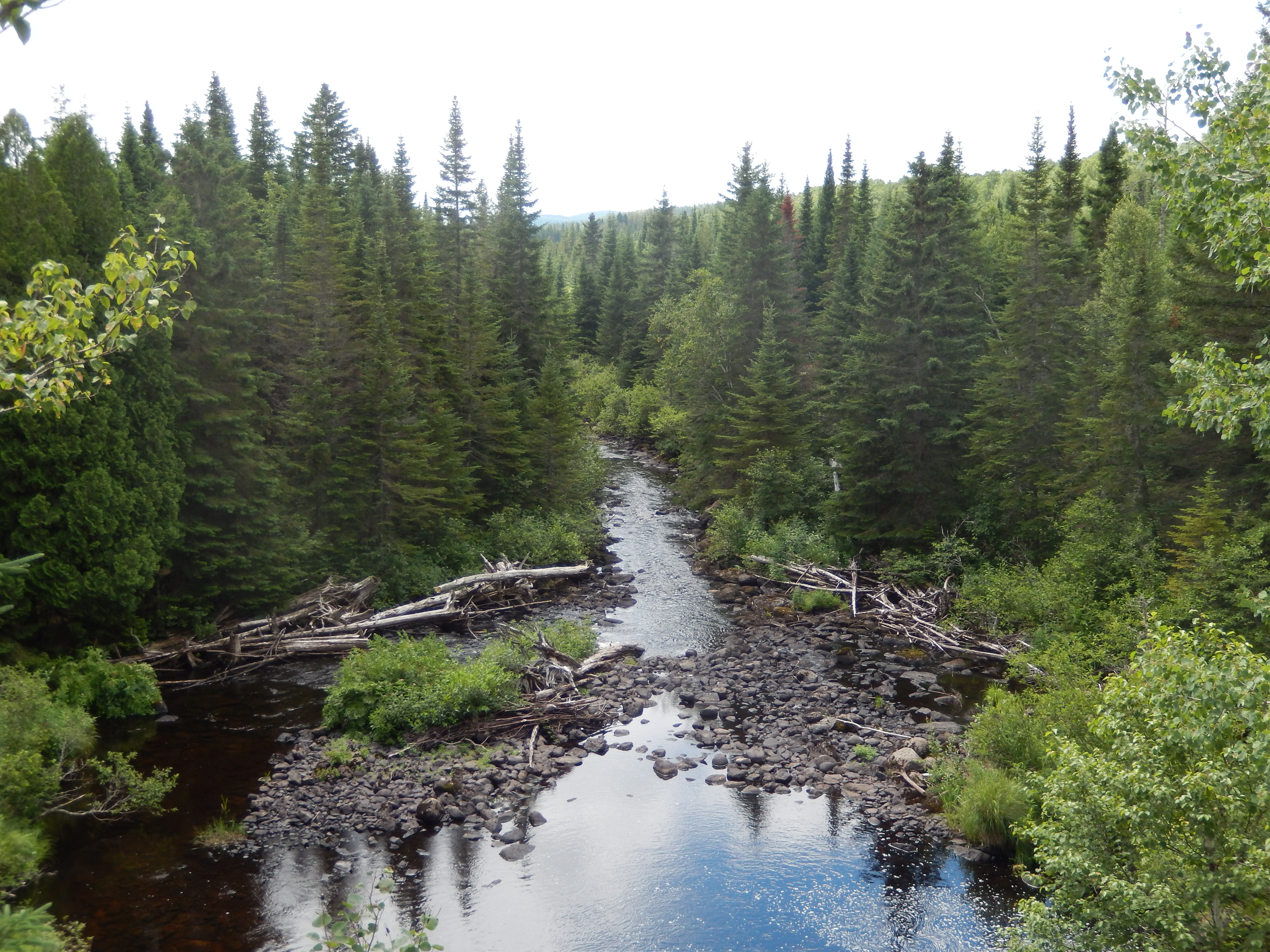
- Saint Francis River from Petit-Témis

- Location within Maine Location within Quebec Location within the United States
- Etymology: Saint Francis Xavier
- Native name: Rivière Saint-François (French)

Location
- Country: Canada, United States
- State (US): Maine (United States)
- Providence (Canada): Quebec (Canada); New Brunswick (Canada)
- County (US): Northwest Aroostook (Maine); St. Francis (Maine)
- Region (Canada): Bas-Saint-Laurent (Quebec); Rivière-Bleue (Quebec); Saint-François Parish (New Brunswick)

Physical characteristics
- Source: Saint-Hubert-de-Rivière-du-Loup, Quebec (Québec)
  - coordinates: 47°40′36″N 69°21′19″W
  - elevation: 359 metres (1,178 ft)
- Mouth: St. Francis (Maine); Saint-François Parish (New Brunswick); flowing in Saint John River
  - coordinates: 47°10′49″N 68°54′14″W
  - elevation: 163 metres (535 ft)
- Length: 102.4 kilometres (63.6 mi)

Basin features
- Landmarks: Kelly Rapids
- Tributaries
  - left: (from the mouth) Canadian Tuladi Brook, Bogasse Brook, Petite coulée Creuse, Coulée Creuse Brook, Jim Brook, Pelletier brook, Botsford Brook, Bleue River, Providence Brook, Beaupré Brook (discharge of Volcan Lake), Des Saules Brook, discharge of Morrison Lake and Yards Lake, Turner Brook, Cascades Brook, Armstrong Brook, Castonguay Brook.
  - right: (from the mouth) Falls Brook, Yankeetuladi Brook, Jones Brook, Dead Brook, Wildcat Brook, Rousseau Brook, Chouinard Brook, Bouchard Brook, Boucanée River, Cèdres Brook, Black Brook.
- Waterbodies: Beau Lake, Glazier Lake

The St. Francis River (French: Rivière Saint-François) is a river roughly 75 miles (120 km) long, which forms part of the Canada–United States border. The river rises (47°44′07″N 69°17′15″W) in a lake of the same name located 12 miles (20 km) east of the Rivière du Loup in Quebec. The portion that forms the boundary starts at the bottom of Lake Pohenegamook at the very northernmost point of New England between Estcourt Station, Maine, and Estcourt, Quebec. The river along the international boundary flows south and then south-east through two deep, narrow lakes to its mouth on the Saint John River at St. Francis, Maine/Saint-François-de-Madawaska, New Brunswick.

USS Bancroft (DD-256) became a Canadian ship as part of the Destroyers for Bases Agreement and was renamed after the St. Francis River to follow the Canadian tradition of naming destroyers after Canadian rivers while recognizing the shared national history of the ship.

== Beau Lake ==
Beau Lake
- Lac Beau (French)
- Location within Maine Location within Quebec
- Location: Temiscouata Regional County Municipality (Quebec); Aroostook County, Maine
- Coordinates: 47°20′N 69°03′W
- Type: Lake
- River sources: Saint Francis River
- Basin countries: Canada; United States
- Max. length: 5 mi (8.0 km)
- Max. width: 1 km (1,100 yd)
- Surface area: 1,795 acres (726 ha)
- Max. depth: 180 feet (55 m)
- Water volume: 138,678 acre⋅ft (171,057,000 m^{3})
- Surface elevation: 575 ft (175 m)

Saint Francis River passes through Beau Lake on the border between Maine and Quebec. The river enters the north end of Beau Lake 15 miles (24 km) downstream of Lake Pohenegamook and leaves the south end of Beau Lake 13 miles (21 km) upstream of the Saint John River confluence. Beau Lake is one of the deepest lakes in northern Maine. The lake is ideal habitat for lake trout, brook trout, and land-locked Atlantic salmon; but these species are in competition with a large population of yellow perch, and muskellunge are migrating into the lake from downstream.

== Glazier Lake ==
Glazier Lake
- Lac Glazier (French)
- Location within Maine Location within New Brunswick
- Location: Madawaska County (New Brunswick); Aroostook County, Maine
- Coordinates: 47°13′40″N 69°00′00″W
- Type: Glacial lake
- River sources: Saint Francis River
- Basin countries: Canada; United States
- Max. length: 5.5 mi (8.9 km)
- Surface area: 703 acres (284 ha)
- Max. depth: 118 feet (36 m)
- Water volume: 47,001 acre⋅ft (57,975,000 m^{3})
- Surface elevation: 559 ft (170 m)

Saint Francis River passes through Glazier Lake on the border between Maine and New Brunswick. The river enters the north end of Glazier Lake 3 miles (4.8 km) downstream of Beau Lake and leaves the south end of Beau Lake 4 miles (6.4 km) upstream of the Saint John River confluence. Tributaries to the lake include Yankeetuladi Brook on the Maine side, and Canadian Tuladi Brook on the New Brunswick side. Glazier Lake is deep and narrow similar to Beau Lake, and offers similarly suitable habitat for lake trout, brook trout, salmon, and muskellunge.

== See also ==
- Lake Pohenegamook, a water body of Quebec
- Saint-Hubert-de-Rivière-du-Loup, Quebec, a municipality
- Saint-Honoré-de-Témiscouata, Quebec, a municipality
- Pohénégamook, Quebec, a municipality
- Rivière-Bleue, Quebec, a municipality
- Témiscouata Regional County Municipality, in Quebec
- Saint-François Parish, New Brunswick, a municipality
- Madawaska County, a county of New Brunswick
- Blue River (St. Francis River), a stream
- Boucané River, a stream
- Saint John River, a stream
- List of rivers of Quebec
- List of rivers of New Brunswick
- List of rivers of Maine
