= Lake Pohenegamook =

Lake in Quebec, Canada

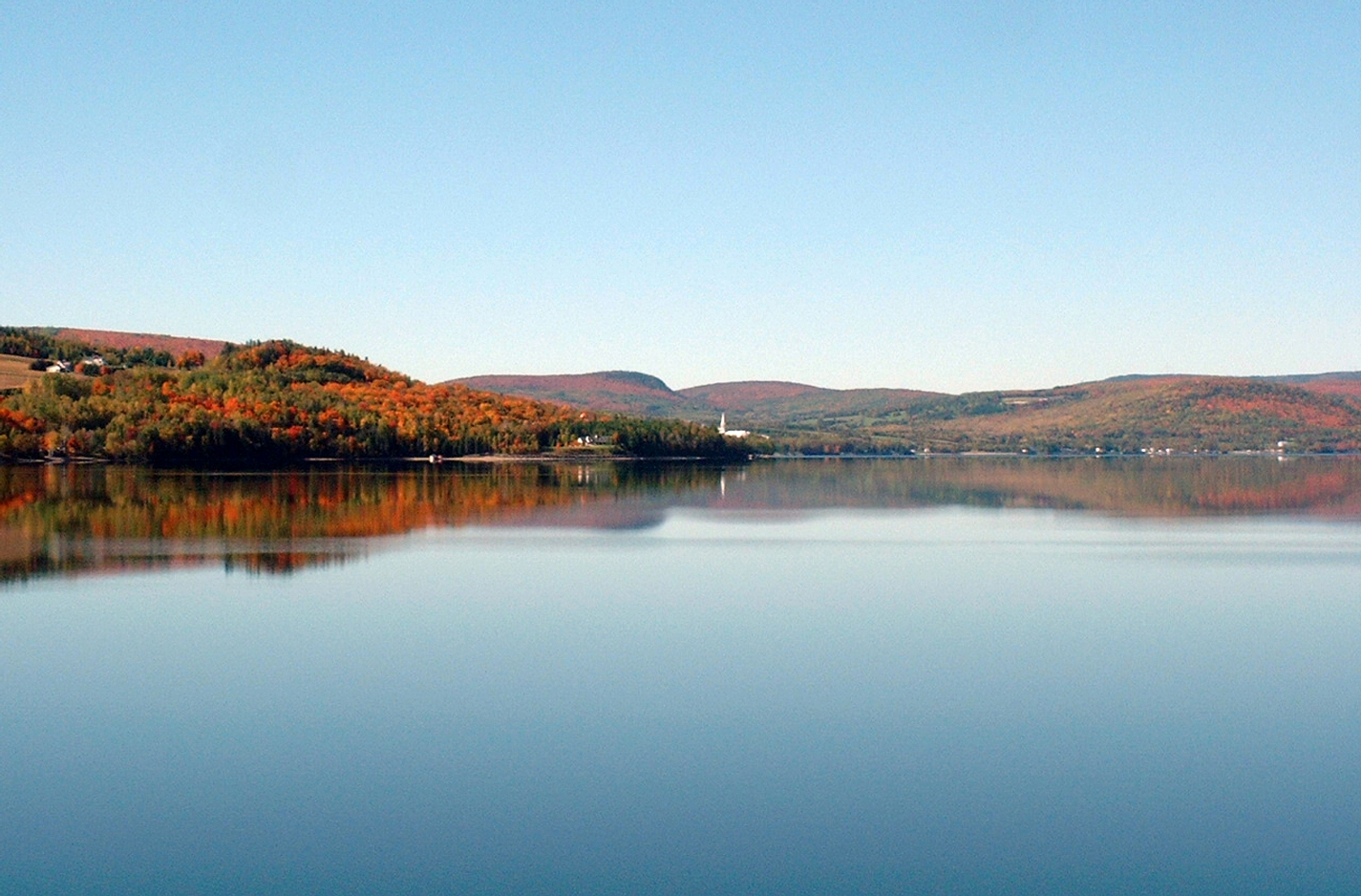

- Location within Quebec
- Location: Pohénégamook, Témiscouata Regional County Municipality, Quebec, Quebec
- Coordinates: 47°29′17″N 69°16′05″W
- Primary inflows: Rivière Boucanée
- Primary outflows: Saint Francis River
- Basin countries: Canada
- Max. length: 9.1 km (5.7 mi)
- Surface elevation: 202 m (663 ft)

Lake Pohenegamook (French: Lac Pohénégamook, pronounced [lak pɔeneɡamok]) is a Canadian lake located in Temiscouata Regional County Municipality (MRC), in the administrative region of Bas-Saint-Laurent in southeastern Quebec, immediately north of the International Boundary with Maine at Aroostook County. It is the source of the Saint Francis River.

== Geography ==
Oriented north-south, the lake is nestled in a valley in the Notre Dame Mountains, part of the Appalachian Range. Route 289 runs along the southern and western shores through the municipality of Pohénégamook—an amalgamation of several villages.

The National Transcontinental Railway constructed its mainline from Winnipeg, Manitoba, to Moncton, New Brunswick, along the western and southern shores in 1912—today this line forms the mainline of CN Rail between Halifax, Nova Scotia, and Montreal, Quebec.

The community of Estcourt Station, Maine, (the northernmost point in New England) is located immediately south of the CN railway line at the lake's southern shore.

== Toponymy ==
The name of Lake Pohenegamook comes from the Abenaki ponegamikw and means 'winter camp'. Many other translations have also appeared over time, like 'drawn in the form of a lying man', 'lake of laughter', 'lake of mockery', 'deep lake' or 'place of resting'.

The place name "Lac Pohénégamook" was formalized on December 5, 1968, at the Commission de toponymie du Québec (Quebec Names Board).

== Legend ==
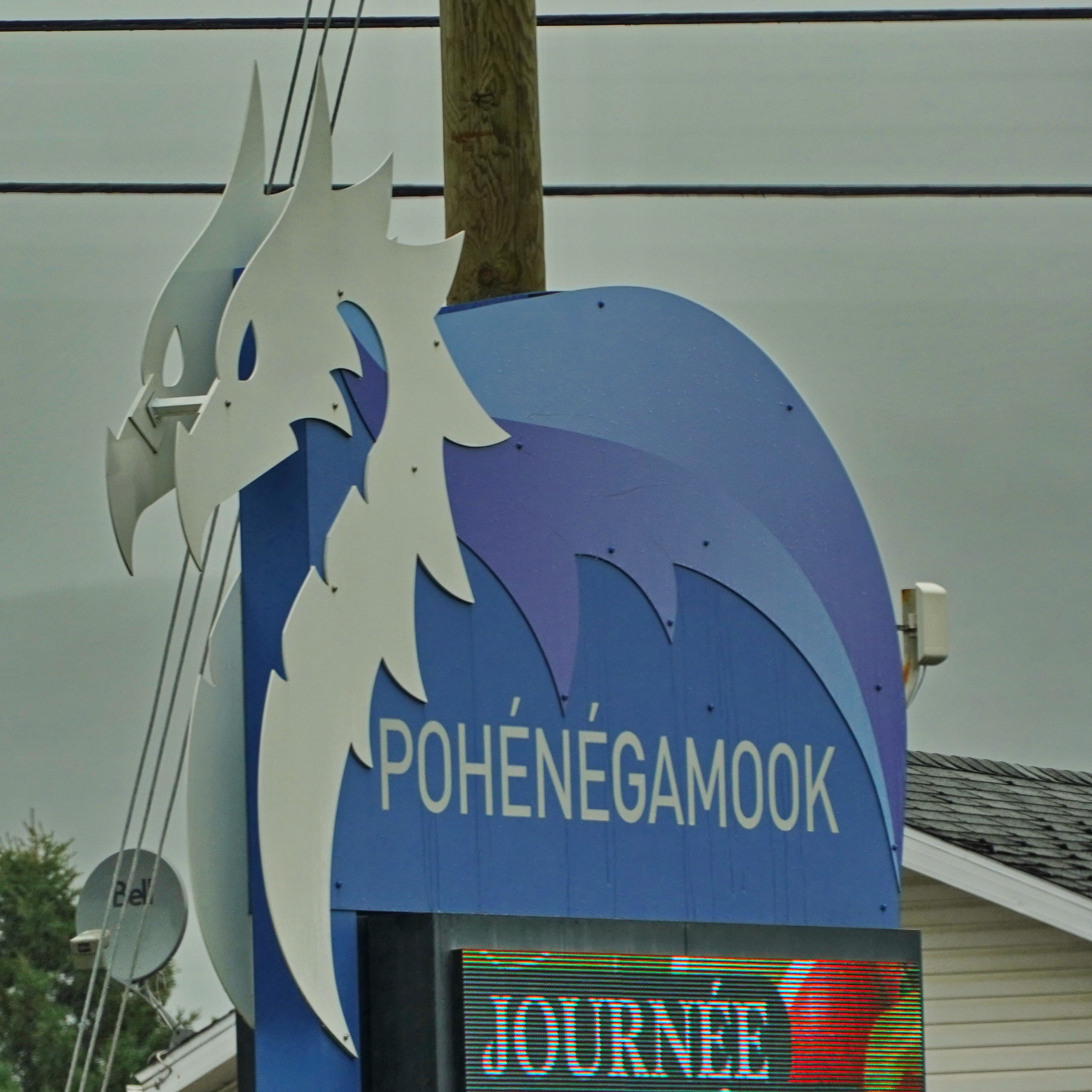
Ponik depiction on town signage

According to legend, a monster that looks like an upturned canoe covered in scales called the Ponik lives in the lake. It is possible that the monster's appearance was conceived from the mistaken observation of a sturgeon, from stories of sea serpents, or from logs floating in the lake's waters. The legend of the Ponik has a positive impact on the lake and the city of Pohenegamook, as it makes them both more known to many Quebecers.

== See also ==
- Pohénégamook, Quebec, a municipality
- Boucanée River, a stream
- Saint Francis River (Canada–United States), a stream
- Estcourt Station, Maine
