= Saint-Marc-du-Lac-Long =

- Parish municipality
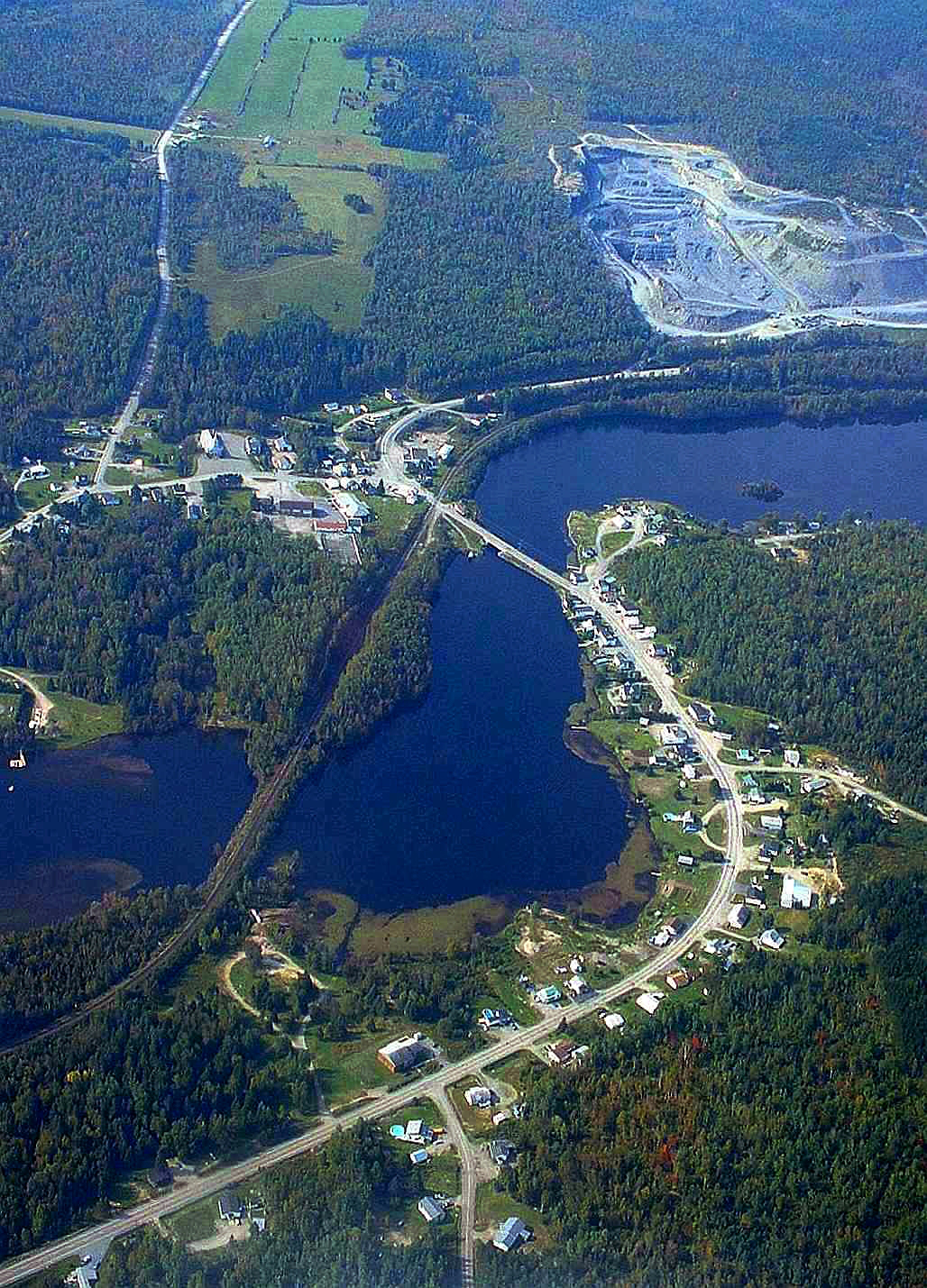
- Aerial view of Saint-Marc-du-Lac-Long

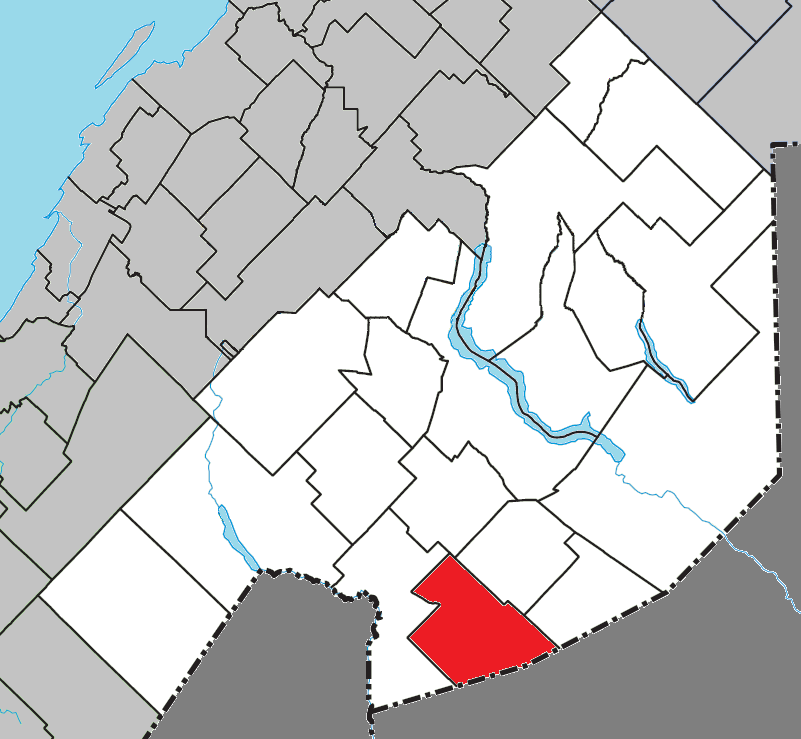
- Location within Témiscouata RCM

- Location in eastern Quebec
- Coordinates: 47°23′40″N 68°52′50″W
- Country: Canada
- Province: Quebec
- Region: Bas-Saint-Laurent
- RCM: Témiscouata
- Constituted: June 11, 1938

Government
  - Mayor: Marcel Dubé
  - Federal riding: Côte-du-Sud—Rivière-du-Loup—Kataskomiq—Témiscouata
  - Prov. riding: Rivière-du-Loup–Témiscouata–Les Basques

Area
  - Total: 155.90 km^{2} (60.19 sq mi)
  - Land: 148.64 km^{2} (57.39 sq mi)

Population (2021)
  - Total: 365
  - Density: 2.5/km^{2} (6.5/sq mi)
  - Pop 2016-2021: ▼8.1%
  - Dwellings: 263
- Time zone: UTC−5 (EST)
  - Summer (DST): UTC−4 (EDT)
- Postal code(s): G0L 1T0
- Area codes: 418 and 581
- Highways: R-289

Saint-Marc-du-Lac-Long (French pronunciation: [sɛ̃ maʁk dy lak lɔ̃ᵑ]) is a parish municipality in the Canadian province of Quebec, located in the Témiscouata Regional County Municipality. It has a total area of 155.9 square kilometres, with a total land area of 148.64 square kilometres.

== Demographics ==
In the 2021 Census of Population conducted by Statistics Canada, Saint-Marc-du-Lac-Long had a population of 365 living in 178 of its 263 total private dwellings, a change of −8.1% from its 2016 population of 397. With a land area of 148.64 km^{2} (57.39 sq mi), it had a population density of 2.5/km^{2} (6.4/sq mi) in 2021.

== See also ==
- Crocs River, a stream
- List of parish municipalities in Quebec
