= West Branch Pocwock Stream =

- Native name: ruisseau Pocwock (French)

Location
- Countries: Canada, United States
- States: Quebec, Maine
- Administrative region and geographic region: Bas-Saint-Laurent, North Maine Woods

Physical characteristics
- Source
  - location: Mountain brook, Picard, Quebec, Kamouraska Regional County Municipality, Bas-Saint-Laurent, Quebec
  - coordinates: 47°14′41″N 69°30′33″W
  - elevation: 616 metres (2,021 ft)
- Mouth
  - location: Township T17 R13 WELS, Aroostook County, Maine, US
  - coordinates: 47°08′06″N 69°26′34″W
  - elevation: 292 metres (958 ft)
- Length: 15.1 kilometres (9.4 mi)

The West Branch Pocwock Stream is a tributary of the Pocwock River flowing in:

- Quebec (Canada): in the administrative area of Bas-Saint-Laurent, in Kamouraska Regional County Municipality, in unorganized territory of Picard, Quebec. Note: In Quebec, the river is designated "ruisseau Pocwock";
- Maine (United States): in North Maine Woods, in the Aroostook County, in townships T18 R13 Wels, T17 R14 Wels and T17 R13 Wels.

Its runs entirely in forested area in isolated mountain valley, mainly in the Maine, at the Southeast of the Canada-US border. Its higher course is located at Northeast of Eastern Lake (Kamouraska).

"West Branch Pocwock Stream" empties on Northeast shore of Pocwock River which flows toward Southeast, up to a river elbow of Saint John River (Bay of Fundy). The later serpentine Eastward, than South-East crossing all the province of New Brunswick and empties on North Shore of Bay of Fundy which is opened to South West to Atlantic Ocean.

The watershed of Pocwock stream is accessible by some forest roads.

== Geography ==
The upper portion of the "Pocwock brook" (French: ruisseau Pocwock) begins in Notre Dame Mountains, in the unorganized territory of Picard, Quebec, in Kamouraska Regional County Municipality, in Quebec. This source is located:

- 3.8 kilometres (2.4 mi) Northwest of the border between Quebec and Maine;
- 5.0 kilometres (3.1 mi) Northeast of Eastern Lake (Kamouraska);
- 13.0 kilometres (8.1 mi) Northwest from the confluence of the "West Branch Pocwock Stream";
- 44.1 kilometres (27.4 mi) Southeast of coast of Saint Lawrence River, in Quebec.

From the source in the mountains, the "West Branch Pocwock Stream" 15.1 kilometres (9.4 mi) as follows:

Higher course of the river (segment of 4.1 kilometres (2.5 mi), in Quebec)

- 4.1 kilometres (2.5 mi) to the Southeast in unorganized territory of Picard, up to the border entre Quebec and Maine.

Lower course of the river (segment of 11.0 kilometres (6.8 mi), in Quebec)

- 3.6 kilometres (2.2 mi) to the southeast in the Maine up to a forest road, crossing through a vertical drop of 132 metres (433 ft);
- 7.4 kilometres (4.6 mi) to the South, through a small forest plain, up to the confluence of the river.

The "West Branch Pocwock Stream" empties on the Northeast shore of Pocwock River, in township T17 R14 Wels, in the Aroostook County. This confluence Is located:

- 6.9 kilometres (4.3 mi) Southeast of the border Canada-US;
- 13.1 kilometres (8.1 mi) Northwest of the confluence of the Chimenticook River;
- 22.0 kilometres (13.7 mi) downstream of the confluence of the Pocwock River.

== Toponymy ==
The term "Pocwock" is associated to "Pocwock River", "East Branch Pocwock Stream". In Québec, the spelling of the river's name uses the letter k in the middle or "Pockwock"; the spelling "Pocwock" (without the letter k in the middle) is used by the GNIS (Geographic Names Information System) in the US.

The place name "West Branch Creek Pockwock" was formalized on August 7, 1978 at the Commission de toponymie du Québec (Quebec Geographical Names Board).

== See also ==
- Kamouraska Regional County Municipality (RCM)
- Aroostook County, a county of Maine
- Pocwock River, a stream
- Saint John River (Bay of Fundy), a stream
- North Maine Woods, a geographical region of Maine
- List of rivers of Quebec
- List of rivers of Maine

== Bibliography ==
- (in English) "West Branch of Pocwock River". Geographic Names Information System. United States Geological Survey, United States Department of the Interior. 30 September 1980.
