= Crocs River =

Location
- Country: Canada
- Province: Quebec and New Brunswick
- Administrative region of Quebec: Bas-Saint-Laurent

Physical characteristics
- Source
  - location: « Lac à Pierre », in Notre Dame Mountains, Bas-Saint-Laurent, Quebec
  - coordinates: 47°20′19″N 68°00′41″W
  - elevation: 407 m (1,335 ft)
- Mouth
  - location: Saint John River (Bay of Fundy), in New Brunswick
  - coordinates: 47°14′20″N 68°44′54″W
  - elevation: 152 m (499 ft)
- Length: 32.3 km (20.1 mi)

Basin features
- Tributaries
  - left: (from the mouth) Carr Brook, Morrison Brook.
  - right: (from the mouth) Rocky Brook, Tapley Brook.

The Crocs River (French: Rivière des Crocs) is a tributary of the Saint John River (Bay of Fundy), in Quebec and New Brunswick, in Canada. The Crocs River flows in the southern part of the Gaspé Peninsula, across the following areas:

- Quebec: administrative region of Bas-Saint-Laurent, in Témiscouata Regional County Municipality (RCM), municipalities of Rivière-Bleue and Saint-Marc-du-Lac-Long;
- New Brunswick: Madawaska County, municipality Saint-François Parish.

== Geography ==
The "Crocs River" rises at the "Lac Pierre" (length: 0.6 kilometres (0.37 mi); height: 407 metres (1,335 ft)) mouth located in forest and mountainous area of Notre Dame Mountains. This source is located at:

- 2.8 kilometres (1.7 mi) north of the border between Quebec and New Brunswick;
- 2.7 kilometres (1.7 mi) east of Beau Lake (Maine-Quebec) which constitutes the border between Quebec and Maine;
- 3.9 kilometres (2.4 mi) southwest boundary of the municipality of Saint-Marc-du-Lac-Long.

From the "Lac à Pierre" (English: Peter Lake), the "Crocs River" flows on 32.3 kilometres (20.1 mi) as follow:

- 1.9 kilometres (1.2 mi) to the southeast, up to the mouth of Lake Bugs (altitude: 376 kilometres (234 mi)) as the current passes through the 0.1 kilometres (0.062 mi);
- 3.6 kilometres (2.2 mi) to the southeast, passing north of the White Mountain, up to the Quebec and New Brunswick border;
- 1.3 kilometres (0.81 mi) eastward, forming a detour to the south, up to return across the border;
- 1.3 kilometres (0.81 mi) to the northeast, up to the boundary of the municipality of Saint-Marc-du-Lac-Long;
- 6.0 kilometres (3.7 mi) eastward along the border, up to return again to cross the border of New Brunswick (Madawaska County);
- 4.6 kilometres (2.9 mi) to the southeast in the Madawaska County up to Tapley Brook (coming from Northwest);
- 3.7 kilometres (2.3 mi) to the Southeast, up to Morrison Creek (coming from the northeast);
- 1.4 kilometres (0.87 mi) southward meandering up to Rocky Brook (coming from the West);
- 5.1 kilometres (3.2 mi) to the southeast up to Highway;
- 1.8 kilometres (1.1 mi) to the southeast, winding up to the route 205;
- 1.6 kilometres (0.99 mi) to the Southeast meandering up to its confluence

The lower segment of the river is called the "Little River". The "river of Crocs" pours on the north shore of Saint John River (Bay of Fundy), facing the Crock island that belongs to an archipelago of islands in the area. In this sector, the Saint John River (Bay of Fundy) is the border between Canada (New Brunswick) and the United States (Maine).

== Toponymy ==
The place name "Crocs River" (French: Rivière des Crocs) was formalized on December 5, 1968, at the Commission de toponymie du Québec (Geographical Quebec Names Board).

== See also ==
- Témiscouata Regional County Municipality (RCM)
- Rivière-Bleue, a Quebec municipality
- Saint-Marc-du-Lac-Long, a Quebec municipality
- Madawaska County, a county New Brunswick
- Saint-François Parish, New Brunswick, a municipality of New Brunswick
- Saint John River (Bay of Fundy), a stream
- List of rivers of Quebec
- List of rivers of New Brunswick
