= Rivière-Bleue =

- Municipality
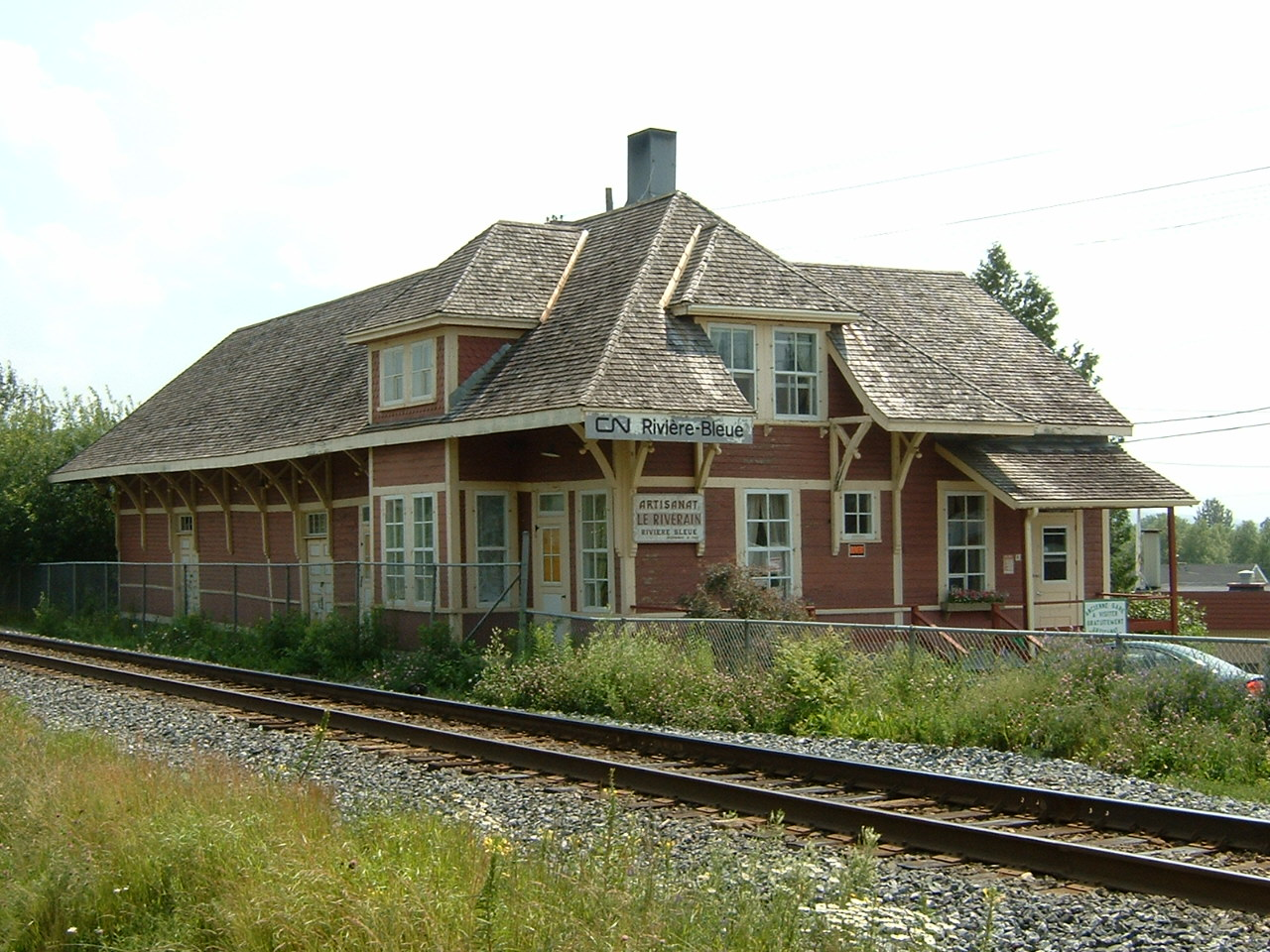

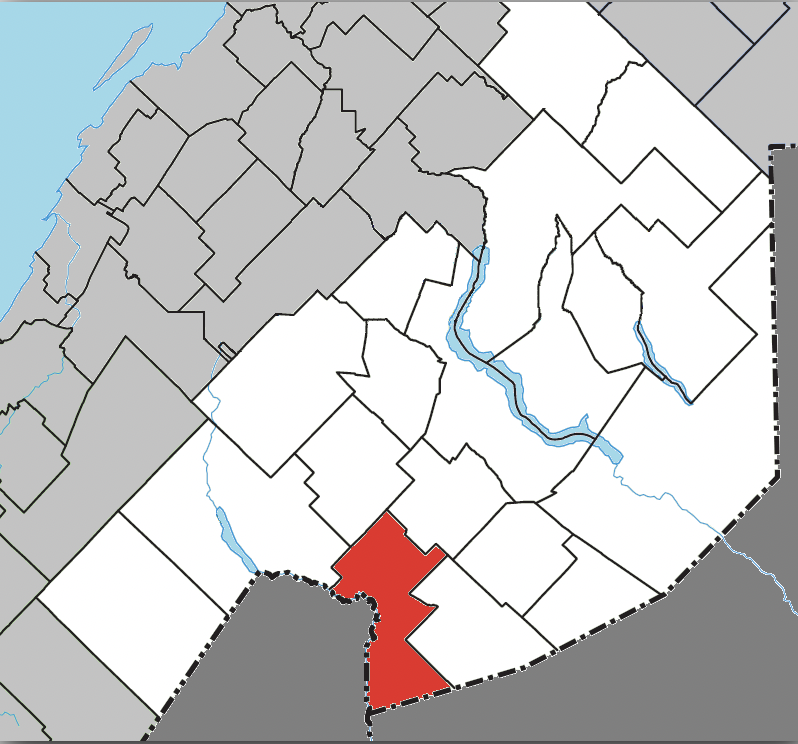
- Location within Témiscouata RCM

- Location in eastern Quebec
- Coordinates: 47°26′N 69°03′W
- Country: Canada
- Province: Quebec
- Region: Bas-Saint-Laurent
- RCM: Témiscouata
- Constituted: June 14, 1975

Government
  - Mayor: Claude H Pelletier
  - Federal riding: Côte-du-Sud—Rivière-du-Loup—Kataskomiq—Témiscouata
  - Prov. riding: Rivière-du-Loup–Témiscouata–Les Basques

Area
  - Total: 180.30 km^{2} (69.61 sq mi)
  - Land: 174.07 km^{2} (67.21 sq mi)

Population (2011)
  - Total: 1,299
  - Density: 7.5/km^{2} (19/sq mi)
  - Pop 2006-2011: ▼7.7%
  - Dwellings: 766
- Time zone: UTC−5 (EST)
  - Summer (DST): UTC−4 (EDT)
- Postal code(s): G0L 2B0
- Area codes: 418 and 581
- Highways: R-289
- Website: www.riviere-bleue.ca

Rivière-Bleue (French pronunciation: [ʁivjɛʁ blø]) is a municipality in Quebec with more or less 1500 inhabitants. The municipality is located in the Bas-Saint-Laurent region on the border of the province of New-Brunswick and Canada–United States border with Maine. The municipality’s territory, which includes two lakes, is known to be a good holiday destination.

== History ==
The first settlers arrived in 1860. They were in fact pioneers from Scottish descents coming from the United States and others from Saint-François-de-Madawaska, New Brunswick. The Catholic mission was founded in 1874 under the name of Saint-Joseph-de-la-Rivière-Bleue, and the postal office opened in 1910. The Catholic parish was erected and the parish municipality created officially in 1914 under the name of the mission. In 1920, the village municipality is created under the same name. The parish municipality and the village municipality are merged in 1975 under the name of Rivière-Bleue.

The National Transcontinental Railway and the station were crucial to the village’s development: travellers, goods, and forestry and agricultural products came and went by rail. In 1913, the first station was built in Tarte, along a sidetrack named in honour of Israël Tarte, journalist, politician and Minister of Transportation under Sir Wilfrid Laurier. The name Tarte Siding is still in use. On January 4, 1914, the first train stopped at the station, on its way from Edmundston, New Brunswick. In 1915, the building was carried a mile down the tracks, to Rivière-Bleue. There, the station was expanded to house the family of Arthur Aubut, the first station master to live in Rivière-Bleue. Until the end of World War II, the railway was the only way to travel outside the village in the winter, and the telegraph, which was then a railway monopoly, was the fastest means of communication.

== Geography ==
=== Climate ===
Climate data for Rivière-Bleue
Month	Jan	Feb	Mar	Apr	May	Jun	Jul	Aug	Sep	Oct	Nov	Dec	Year
Record high °C (°F)	13.0 (55.4)	14.0 (57.2)	25.0 (77.0)	27.0 (80.6)	34.5 (94.1)	35.0 (95.0)	36.0 (96.8)	34.5 (94.1)	33.6 (92.5)	29.0 (84.2)	23.3 (73.9)	14.4 (57.9)	36.0 (96.8)
Mean daily maximum °C (°F)	−6.9 (19.6)	−4.8 (23.4)	1.2 (34.2)	8.5 (47.3)	17.2 (63.0)	22.1 (71.8)	25.0 (77.0)	24.1 (75.4)	19.2 (66.6)	11.5 (52.7)	4.0 (39.2)	−2.8 (27.0)	9.9 (49.8)
Daily mean °C (°F)	−13 (9)	−11.8 (10.8)	−5.5 (22.1)	2.4 (36.3)	10.1 (50.2)	15.0 (59.0)	18.1 (64.6)	17.0 (62.6)	12.3 (54.1)	5.8 (42.4)	−0.5 (31.1)	−7.7 (18.1)	3.5 (38.3)
Mean daily minimum °C (°F)	−19.1 (−2.4)	−18.7 (−1.7)	−11.9 (10.6)	−3.6 (25.5)	2.9 (37.2)	7.8 (46.0)	11.0 (51.8)	9.8 (49.6)	5.3 (41.5)	0.2 (32.4)	−4.9 (23.2)	−12.5 (9.5)	−2.8 (27.0)
Record low °C (°F)	−43.6 (−46.5)	−38.8 (−37.8)	−36.2 (−33.2)	−28.5 (−19.3)	−6.6 (20.1)	−3.6 (25.5)	1.3 (34.3)	−1.2 (29.8)	−6.6 (20.1)	−12.4 (9.7)	−26.0 (−14.8)	−38.2 (−36.8)	−43.6 (−46.5)
Average precipitation mm (inches)	71.1 (2.80)	63.2 (2.49)	64.1 (2.52)	67.0 (2.64)	84.6 (3.33)	101.1 (3.98)	106.6 (4.20)	86.4 (3.40)	89.4 (3.52)	102.7 (4.04)	86.9 (3.42)	88.6 (3.49)	1,011.8 (39.83)
Source: Environment Canada (based on Edmundston weather station)

== See also ==
- List of municipalities in Quebec
- Témiscouata Regional County Municipality, (RCM)
- Crocs River, a stream
- Beau Lake, a lake
