= Beau Lake (Maine-Quebec) =

Lake in Quebec and Maine

- Location within Maine
- Location: Rivière-Bleue, Quebec, Témiscouata Regional County Municipality in Quebec and Aroostook County in Maine
- Coordinates: 47°20′40″N 69°03′13″W
- Type: Lake consisting of enlargement of the river
- Primary inflows: Saint Francis River
- Primary outflows: Saint Francis River
- Catchment area: Bay of Fundy
- Basin countries: Canada and United States
- Max. length: 8.1 km (5.0 mi)
- Max. width: 1.1 km (0.68 mi)
- Surface area: 7.23 km^{2} (2.79 sq mi)
- Max. depth: 55 m (180 ft)
- Surface elevation: 176 m (577 ft)

Beau Lake (in French: "Le Beau Lac") is a freshwater lake in the north–south axis through the Saint Francis River. The lake is the center of the boundary between:

- Maine (United States): North Maine Woods, Aroostook County, Big Twenty, township T20 R11 & R12 Wels (northern part of the western shore of the lake) and T19 R11 Wels;
- Quebec (Canada): administrative region of Bas-Saint-Laurent, regional county municipality (RCM) Témiscouata Regional County Municipality, in municipality of Rivière-Bleue, Quebec.

This lake is located in a densely forested and sparsely populated region of the New England–Acadian forests. Historically, the main economic activity was forestry. Since the mid-twentieth century, the resort and tourist activities have developed. This lake is particularly renowned for fishing and recreational boating in particular because of its mountainous landscape.

A forest road runs along the western shore of the lake in Maine. On the Quebec side, a few dozen homes are served by an access road to the northern half of the lake.

== Geography ==
The lake represents a wide section of the Saint Francis River. This lake is walled by steep cliffs, with elevations reaching as high as 487 metres (1,598 ft) on the Maine side and 516 metres (1,693 ft) on the Quebec side.

This lake is fed by the Saint Francis River (from the north) and the stream of "Coulée Creuse" (English: Hollow Cast) (from the east). This lake discharges through the South by the continuity of the Saint Francis River. The southern tip of the lake is very close to the tripoint of Quebec, Maine, and New Brunswick.

== Toponym ==
The place name "Le Beau Lac" was formalized on December 5, 1968, by the Commission de toponymie du Québec (Quebec Geographical Names Board).

== See also ==
- Aroostook County, a county Maine
- North Maine Woods
- Témiscouata Regional County Municipality (RCM)
- Rivière-Bleue, Quebec, a municipality of Quebec
- Saint Francis River, a stream
- List of lakes of Canada
- List of lakes in Maine
