= Picard, Quebec =

Picard
- Unorganized territory
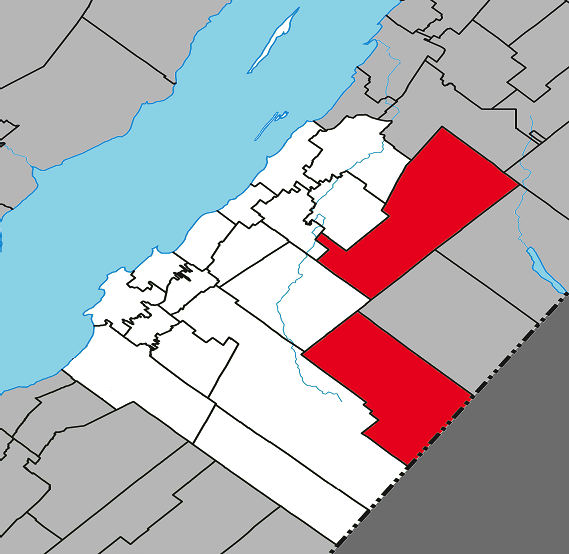
- Location within Kamouraska RCM

- Location in eastern Quebec
- Coordinates: 47°30′N 69°31′W
- Country: Canada
- Province: Quebec
- Region: Bas-Saint-Laurent
- RCM: Kamouraska

Government
  - Federal riding: Côte-du-Sud—Rivière-du-Loup—Kataskomiq—Témiscouata
  - Prov. riding: Côte-du-Sud

Area
  - Total: 572.20 km^{2} (220.93 sq mi)
  - Land: 568.10 km^{2} (219.34 sq mi)

Population (2021)
  - Total: 5
  - Density: 0/km^{2} (0/sq mi)
  - Pop 2016-2021: ▼50%
  - Dwellings: 3
- Time zone: UTC−5 (EST)
  - Summer (DST): UTC−4 (EDT)
- Highways: R-289

Picard is an unorganized territory in the Canadian province of Quebec, located in the Kamouraska Regional County Municipality. The territory consists of two non-contiguous areas.

== See also ==
- West Branch Little Black River (Quebec–Maine), a stream
- West Branch Pocwock Stream, a stream
