= Little Black River (Saint John River tributary) =

Little Black River Named "Rivière Noire" in Quebec

Location
- Countries: Canada; United States
- Province: Quebec
- State: Maine

Physical characteristics
- Source
  - location: Saint-Athanase, Quebec, in Temiscouata RCM, Bas-Saint-Laurent
  - coordinates: 47°24′47″N 69°30′08″W
- Mouth
  - location: Allagash, Maine, Aroostook County, North Maine Woods, Maine
  - coordinates: 47°07′00″N 69°05′36″W
- Length: 62.9 km (39.1 mi)
- Discharge
  - location: Allagash, Maine

Basin features
- Tributaries
  - left: (from mouth) In Maine: Meadow brook, Oxbow brook, Little Fafey brook, Hafey brook, Rocky brook, Beauer Branch (upper part named "ruisseau du Castor" in Quebec); in Quebec: discharge of "Lac du Cinq" (Five Lake).
  - right: (from mouth) In Maine: Kelly brook, Moores brook, Johnson brook, Harvey brook, Carrie Bogan brook, Knowland Brook, West Branch, Campbell Branch Little Black River, West Branch Little Black River (Quebec–Maine).

The Little Black River (French: Rivière Noire) is a river flowing in the south of Quebec (Canada) and in the north of Maine (United States).

== Geography ==
From its source (47°24′47″N 69°31′01″W), in Témiscouata RCM, Quebec, the river runs East and Southeast across the Canada–United States border in Maine Township 19, Range 12, WELS, to the Saint John River at Allagash, Maine.

The Little Black River flows over 62.9 kilometres (39.1 mi) especially in forest areas.

Upper course of the river in Quebec (segment of 19.4 kilometres (12.1 mi) designated Black River)

From its source, the river flows on:

- 3.5 kilometres (2.2 mi) to the East, to the outlet of "Lac du Cinq" (Lake Five);
- 5.8 kilometres (3.6 mi) to the Southeast, to the bridge of the Moulin Théberge Lake;
- 10.1 kilometres (6.3 mi) to the Southeast, crossing the "Lac Noir" (Black Lake) which is surrounded by a marsh area, up to the border between Quebec (Canada) and Maine (United States).

Lower course of the river in Maine (segment of 43.5 kilometres (27.0 mi) designated Little Black River)

From the border between Quebec and Maine, the Little Black river flows on:

- 8.1 kilometres (5.0 mi) to the South, to the confluence of the West Branch Little Black River (Quebec–Maine) (from the West);
- 0.2 kilometres (0.12 mi) to the South, to the confluence of the Campbell Branch Little Black River (from the Southwest);
- 8.5 kilometres (5.3 mi) to the Southeast, until Rocky Brook (from the North);
- 6.0 kilometres (3.7 mi) to the East, passing South of Boat Landing Mountain until Hofey Brook (from the North);
- 1.7 kilometres (1.1 mi) Southward collecting the waters of Little Brook Hafey until Knowland Brook (from the Southwest);
- 8.2 kilometres (5.1 mi) to the Southeast, winding up Carrie Bogan Brook (from the Southwest);
- 10.8 kilometres (6.7 mi) to the Southeast, passing between two sets of high mountains (including the Johnson Mountain Brook Kelly Brook and Mountain), to the confluence of the river

The confluence of the Black River ("Little Black River") is located in Allagash, Maine, in Aroostook County, either:

- 1.3 kilometres (0.81 mi) downstream from the St. Clair Island (St Clair Island);
- 4.8 kilometres (3.0 mi) upstream of the confluence of the Allagash River (from the Southwest);
- 27.9 kilometres (17.3 mi) Southeast of the border between Quebec and Maine.

== See also ==
Media related to Category: Little Black River (Saint John River at Wikimedia Commons

- Saint-Athanase, Quebec, a municipality
- Allagash, Maine, a town
- Témiscouata Regional County Municipality, a RCM in Quebec
- Aroostook County, a county in Maine
- Saint John River (Bay of Fundy), a stream
- West Branch Little Black River (Quebec–Maine), a stream
- Campbell Branch Little Black River
- List of rivers of Maine
- List of rivers of Quebec
