= Big Twenty Township, Maine =

Town in Maine, United States

Coordinates: 47°23′45″N 69°10′00″W

The Big Twenty Township is an administrative division in Aroostook County in northern Maine. It is one of the largest townships in Maine and contains Estcourt Station, a village of four people that is the northernmost point in Maine and New England.

== Geography ==
The Big Twenty Township is made up of two separate survey townships, T20 R11 and T20 R12 WELS (West of the Easterly Line of the State). It is bordered by Quebec; Canada to the north, east, and west; and by T19 R11 and T19 R12 WELS to the south. The borders of the township were settled on August 9, 1842, with the signing of the Webster–Ashburton Treaty. The treaty, named for US Secretary of State Daniel Webster and United Kingdom Privy Counsellor Lord Ashburton, ended the Aroostook War and also set the Canada–United States border further west.

== Population ==
The Big Twenty Township has fewer than 20 year-round residents. The land is used mainly for logging, and the only roads that exist are logging roads; there are no state highways. Some of the land is owned by camp owners, and several camps straddle the US-Canada border.

Some people have property that straddles the border and have received written consent from border patrol to cross the border when they want to avoid issues.
