= East Lake (Canada – United States border) =

Lake in the United States and Canada

Coordinates: 47.1939°N 69.5656°W

East Lake (French: Lac de l'Est) is a lake crossing the Canada-US border located in:

- the municipality of Mont-Carmel, Quebec in Kamouraska Regional County Municipality (RCM), in the administrative region of Bas-Saint-Laurent in province Quebec, in Canada;
- the township T17 R14 WELS of Aroostook County, in North Maine Woods, in state of Maine, in United States.

The Northwest shore of the lake has a resort development on the northern part of the lake with the access road.

== Location ==
This waterbody is located on the route 287, at 36 kilometres (22 mi) (including 15 kilometres (9.3 mi) uncoated) to exit 456 of Highway 20. This lake is crossed at its southern limit, by border between the province of Quebec and Maine; this border is located in the Southeast part of the lake. Discharging into the "Little Eastern Lake" through a strait 0.6 kilometres (0.37 mi) long, the Eastern Lake feeds the Chimenticook River, which empties into the Saint John River, which flows into the Maine and New Brunswick.

The mouth of East Lake is located in the township T17 R14 Wels, in North Maine Woods, in the Maine to:

- 0.4 kilometres (0.25 mi) Southeast of the Canada-US border;
- 18 kilometres (11 mi) Northwest of the confluence of the Chimenticook River located in Maine;
- 47.8 kilometres (29.7 mi) Southeast of the coast of St. Lawrence River at the level of La Pocatière, Québec.

Tapered shape, the lake stretches 9.1 kilometres (5.7 mi) long and a maximum width of 0.8 kilometres (0.50 mi). It is surrounded by mountains whose peaks reach 672 metres (2,205 ft) at northeast and 535 metres (1,755 ft) at southwest side.

== Toponym ==
The place name has been known for over a century. It refers to its position East of Lake Sainte Anne, an important water body in this border region in the neighboring municipality of Sainte-Perpétue, Chaudière-Appalaches, Quebec. Another name appeared in 1944 on the Township map: Lake Kijemquispam, presumably a Mi'kmaq place name.

The place name "Lac de l’Est " (English: Eastern Lake) was formalized on December 5, 1968, by the Commission de toponymie du Québec (English: Quebec Places Names Board).

== Economical activities ==
This is the logging of the Highlands in Kamouraska that brought people to stand at the head of the lake (northern part). In 1894, the first sawmill is opened by a contractor from New Brunswick, who did the log drive logs toward Saint John River. A winter hamlet quickly developed, serviced by a post office as of 1898. Other mills have succeeded, activity peaking towards 1930 when 300 people permanently living there.

Later, we started to designate this hamlet by the name of Eatonville, but the name of "Lac de l’Est" (English: Eastern Lake) remained. After the 1960, cutting wood decreased and camps of lumberjacks were replaced by cottages, vacationers attracted by a large beach along the lake.

== See also ==
- Spikes River, stream
- Chimenticook River, stream
- Saint John River (Bay of Fundy), stream
- Kamouraska Regional County Municipality
- North Maine Woods, a geographical region in northern Maine
