= West Branch Little Black River (Quebec–Maine) =

West Branch Little Black River French: "Branche Ouest de la Petite rivière Noire" and named "Ruisseau à l'Eau Claire" (Clearwater brook) in Quebec

Location
- Countries: Canada; United States
- Province: Quebec
- State: Maine

Physical characteristics
- Source
  - location: Saint-Athanase, Quebec, MRC de Témiscouata, Quebec, Canada, confluence of « Branche Ouest du Ruisseau à l'Eau Claire » (West Branch of Clearwater brook) and « Petit ruisseau à l'Eau Claire » (Little Clearwater brook) in Quebec
  - coordinates: 47°20′25″N 69°26′32″W
  - elevation: 318 metres (1,043 ft)
- Mouth
  - location: zone T18 R13 Wels, Aroostook County, North Maine Woods region, Maine
  - coordinates: 47°15′54″N 69°21′03″W
  - elevation: 242 metres (794 ft)
- Length: 14.0 kilometres (8.7 mi)
- Discharge
  - location: Little Black River (Saint John River)

Basin features
- Tributaries
  - right: Morrison brook

The West Branch Little Black River (French: Ruisseau à l'Eau Claire) is a short river in Quebec and northern Maine.

== Geography ==
The river runs east and southeast, roughly along the border between Témiscouata and Kamouraska RCM, to the Canada–United States border in Maine Township 19, Range 12, WELS.

The upper part of the "West Branch Little Black River" begins in Notre Dame Mountains at the confluence of the "Branche Ouest du Ruisseau à l'Eau Claire" (West Branch Clearwater Brook) and "Petit ruisseau à l'Eau Claire" (Little Clearwater brook), in the municipality of Saint-Athanase, Quebec, in Témiscouata Regional County Municipality (RCM), in Bas-Saint-Laurent administrative region, in Quebec.

This confluence of these two streams is located at:

- 0.6 kilometres (0.37 mi) at North-East of the limit of the RCM Kamouraska Regional County Municipality (unorganized territory of Picard;
- 5.8 kilometres (3.6 mi) at Northwest of the border between Quebec and Maine;
- 11.7 kilometres (7.3 mi) at Northeast of the confluence of the "West Branch Little Black River".

Course of Ruisseau à l'Eau Claire (Clearwater brook) (segment of 7.8 kilometres (4.8 mi) flowing in Quebec)

The segment of this river in Canadian territory is named "Ruisseau à l'Eau Claire" (Clearwater brook) and runs as follows:

- 1.3 kilometres (0.81 mi) Southward to the boundary of the unorganized territory of Picard;
- 3.5 kilometres (2.2 mi) to the Southeast in the unorganized territory of Picard, to a stream (from the southwest);
- 1.4 kilometres (0.87 mi) to the Southeast, to the boundary of the municipality of Saint-Athanase, Quebec;
- 1.0 kilometre (0.62 mi) to the Southeast in Saint-Athanase, Quebec to the limit of the unorganized territory of Picard;
- 0.6 kilometres (0.37 mi) to the Southeast in the unorganized territory of Picard, to the border between Quebec and Maine.

Course of West Branch Little Black River(segment of 6.2 kilometres (3.9 mi) from the Maine)

From the border between Quebec and Maine, the "West Branch Little Black River" flows as follows:

- 2.8 kilometres (1.7 mi) (or 1.5 kilometres (0.93 mi) in a straight line) to the Southeast, winding up to Morrison Creek (from the West) which course begins in the unorganized territory of Picard, in Kamouraska Regional County Municipality (RCM), in Quebec;
- 3.4 kilometres (2.1 mi) to the Southeast, up to the confluence of the river.

The "Branch West Little Black River" flows into a river bend on the West bank of the Little Black River (Saint John River) which flows Southeast up to the North shore of Saint John River.

== Toponymy ==
The toponym "Ruisseau à l'Eau Claire" (English: Clearwater brook) was officialized on December 5, 1968, at Commission de toponymie du Québec (Québec Names Place Board).

The toponym "West Branch Little Black River" was officialized on September 30, 1980, at Geographic Names Information System (GNIS) of United States.

== See also ==
- Saint-Athanase, Quebec, a municipality of Quebec
- Picard, Quebec, an unorganized territory of Quebec
- Kamouraska Regional County Municipality
- Temiscouata Regional County Municipality
- Aroostook County, Maine
- Little Black River (Saint John River)
- Saint John River (Bay of Fundy)
- List of rivers of Quebec
- List of rivers of Maine
