= Estcourt Station, Maine =

Border settlement in northern Maine, USA

Estcourt Station
- Village
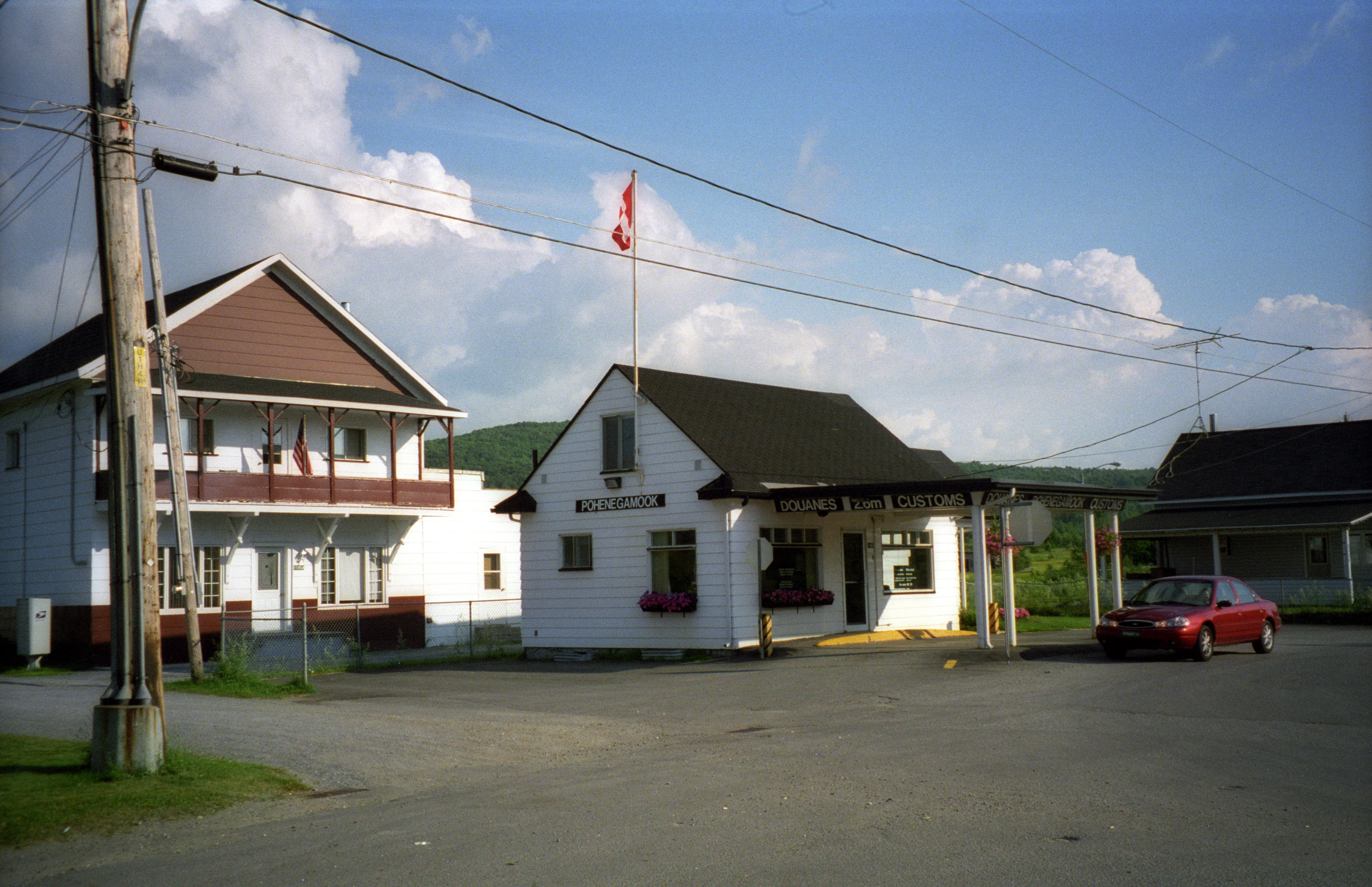
- Customs station between Estcourt Station and Pohénégamook

- Location within Maine Location within the United States
- Coordinates: 47°27′22″N 69°13′39″W
- Country: United States
- State: Maine

Population
  - Total: 4
- Area codes: 418 and 581

Estcourt Station (elevation: 671 ft (205 m), pop. 4) is a village within the Big Twenty Township in the state of Maine. It is the northernmost point in the United States east of the Great Lakes. The ZIP Code for Estcourt Station is 04741. Although part of Maine, the village uses Quebec, Canada area code 418.

== Overview ==
Estcourt Station is located on the Canada–United States border between Maine and Quebec, at the southern end of Lake Pohenegamook in the North Maine Woods region. It derives its name from the adjacent village of Estcourt, Quebec, which is part of the larger municipality of Pohénégamook. The Estcourt Station–Pohénégamook Border Crossing is staffed during the work week, usually for processing logging trucks that access Maine's North Woods to haul timber to Quebec saw mills.

The populated part of Estcourt Station is essentially a sliver of the village of Estcourt that was cut off when the international boundary was properly surveyed through the area (see Webster–Ashburton Treaty). It consists of a row of several houses along Rue de la Frontière, a street on the Quebec side of the border, some of which were built before the survey and which the border now passes through.

Although the US census reports that four people live in the village, according to a Canada Border Services Agency agent, no one lives in Estcourt Station full-time as of 2016. A few U.S. residents live in the village during the summer. They must follow the hours of the border control stations; thus, after 5 p.m. on Friday, they cannot leave until 8 a.m. Monday. Anyone wishing to travel between Pohénégamook and Estcourt Station legally after hours would have to travel on hundreds of miles of private logging roads through the North Maine Woods that are difficult to navigate during spring and summer rains, and almost inaccessible because of snow during the winter; there are no towns or paved roads in the North Maine Woods. Likewise, Estcourt Station is connected to Hydro-Québec for electricity. The community receives drinking water and other municipal services from Pohénégamook.

Canadian National Railway's transcontinental main line between Halifax and Montreal passes immediately north of Rue de la Frontière.

== Michel Jalbert incident ==
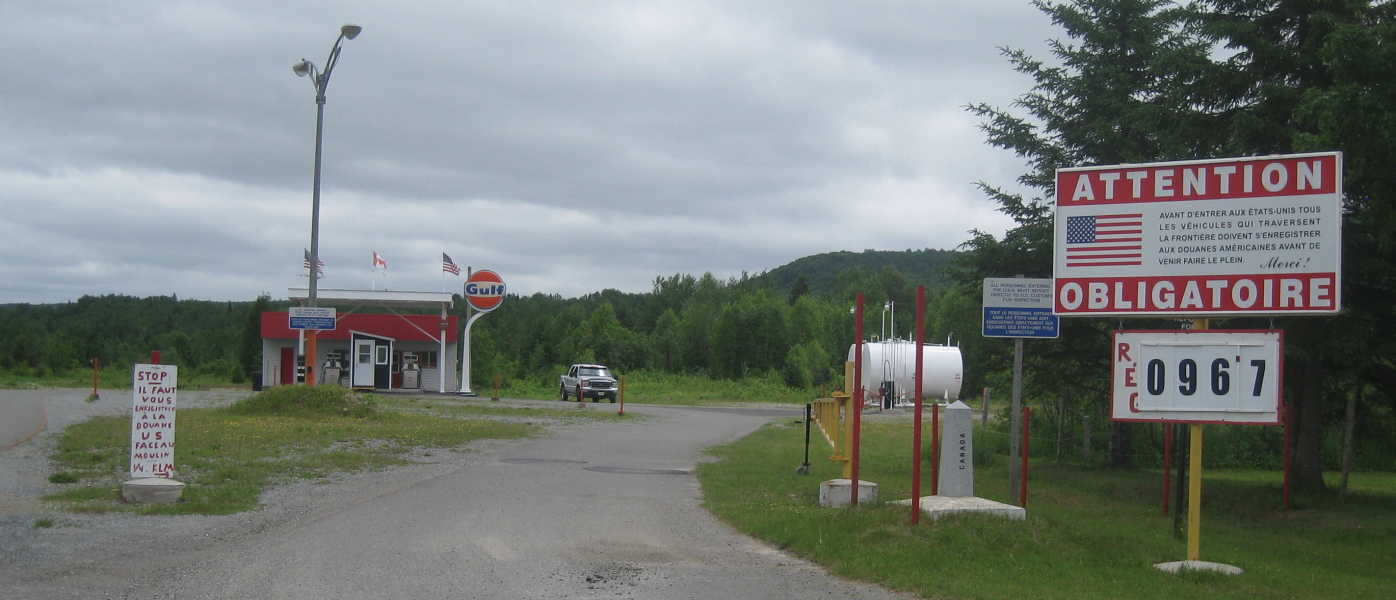
The US gas station at Estcourt Station as seen in 2009 where Michel Jalbert filled up his truck. The international border marker can be seen center right. A sign states: "Attention/Compulsory. Before entering the United States all vehicles crossing the border must register with American customs before coming to refuel"

In October 2002, a Pohénégamook resident named Michel Jalbert was arrested by two U.S. Border Patrol officers 10 m (33 ft) from the Canadian border after he had driven across to Estcourt Station to buy fuel for his truck. After he spent more than a month in a US federal prison, he was released and allowed to return to Canada on a $5,000 bond.

U.S. agents said Jalbert had driven past a closed U.S. Customs Service post and not declared he was entering the United States. In March 2003, Jalbert pled guilty in a US federal court to a charge that he crossed the US–Canadian border illegally; his sentence was a plea deal that was 35 days' time already served in jail, two years of supervised release and no fines. The US Secretary of State at the time, Colin Powell, called the incident "unfortunate" during a visit to Canada.

== Climate ==
According to the Köppen climate classification system, Estcourt Station has a warm-summer humid continental climate (Dfb). Dfb climates are characterized by a least one month having an average mean temperature ≤ 32.0 °F (0.0 °C), at least four months with an average mean temperature ≥ 50.0 °F (10.0 °C), all months with an average mean temperature < 71.6 °F (22.0 °C) and no significant precipitation difference between seasons. Although most summer days are comfortably humid in Estcourt Station, episodes of warmth and high humidity can occur with heat index values > 87 °F (31 °C). Since 1981, the highest air temperature was 92.2 °F (33.4 °C) on July 5, 2008, and the highest daily average mean dew point was 70.1 °F (21.2 °C) on July 2, 2002. The average wettest month is July which corresponds with the annual peak in thunderstorm activity. Since 1981, the wettest calendar day was 2.96 inches (75 mm) on October 15, 2005. During the winter months, the average annual extreme minimum air temperature is −32.2 °F (−35.7 °C). Since 1981, the coldest air temperature was −39.2 °F (−39.6 °C) on January 16, 2009. Episodes of extreme cold and wind can occur with wind chill values < −48 °F (−44 °C). The average annual snowfall (Sep-May) is > 100 inches (254 cm).

Climate data for Estcourt Station, Elevation 705 ft (215 m), 1981-2010 normals, extremes 1981-2018 (all data is interpolated)
Month	Jan	Feb	Mar	Apr	May	Jun	Jul	Aug	Sep	Oct	Nov	Dec	Year
Record high °F (°C)	49.4 (9.7)	57.6 (14.2)	73.7 (23.2)	81.3 (27.4)	89.7 (32.1)	92.0 (33.3)	92.2 (33.4)	90.0 (32.2)	88.2 (31.2)	77.7 (25.4)	65.2 (18.4)	57.1 (13.9)	92.2 (33.4)
Mean daily maximum °F (°C)	17.8 (−7.9)	22.0 (−5.6)	32.5 (0.3)	46.5 (8.1)	61.5 (16.4)	71.0 (21.7)	75.4 (24.1)	73.7 (23.2)	64.5 (18.1)	51.0 (10.6)	37.2 (2.9)	24.9 (−3.9)	48.3 (9.1)
Daily mean °F (°C)	7.0 (−13.9)	10.5 (−11.9)	21.5 (−5.8)	36.3 (2.4)	49.4 (9.7)	59.0 (15.0)	63.9 (17.7)	62.0 (16.7)	53.5 (11.9)	41.7 (5.4)	29.7 (−1.3)	15.9 (−8.9)	37.7 (3.2)
Mean daily minimum °F (°C)	−3.7 (−19.8)	−0.9 (−18.3)	10.5 (−11.9)	26.1 (−3.3)	37.3 (2.9)	47.0 (8.3)	52.4 (11.3)	50.4 (10.2)	42.6 (5.9)	32.4 (0.2)	22.3 (−5.4)	6.9 (−13.9)	27.1 (−2.7)
Record low °F (°C)	−39.2 (−39.6)	−37.1 (−38.4)	−31.3 (−35.2)	−10.7 (−23.7)	21.2 (−6.0)	29.5 (−1.4)	36.5 (2.5)	32.1 (0.1)	23.6 (−4.7)	15.2 (−9.3)	−12.2 (−24.6)	−33.8 (−36.6)	−39.2 (−39.6)
Average precipitation inches (mm)	3.24 (82)	2.97 (75)	3.17 (81)	3.54 (90)	3.72 (94)	4.08 (104)	4.59 (117)	4.05 (103)	4.02 (102)	4.23 (107)	3.80 (97)	3.85 (98)	45.26 (1,150)
Average relative humidity (%)	74.1	71.8	66.6	60.4	58.8	63.9	68.2	69.5	72.8	71.9	74.2	75.4	69.0
Average dew point °F (°C)	0.5 (−17.5)	3.2 (−16.0)	12.1 (−11.1)	23.9 (−4.5)	35.6 (2.0)	46.8 (8.2)	53.2 (11.8)	51.9 (11.1)	45.0 (7.2)	33.3 (0.7)	22.5 (−5.3)	9.5 (−12.5)	28.2 (−2.1)
Source: PRISM

== Ecology ==
According to the A. W. Kuchler U.S. potential natural vegetation types, Estcourt Station would have a dominant vegetation type of Northern Hardwoods/Spruce (108) with a dominant vegetation form of Northern Hardwoods (23). The plant hardiness zone is 3b with an average annual extreme minimum air temperature of −32.2 °F (−35.7 °C). The spring bloom typically peaks around May 17 and fall color usually peaks around September 25.

== See also ==
- Hyder, Alaska, and Stewart, British Columbia
- Beebe Plain, Vermont and Beebe Plain, Stanstead, Quebec
