= Saint-Athanase =

- Municipality
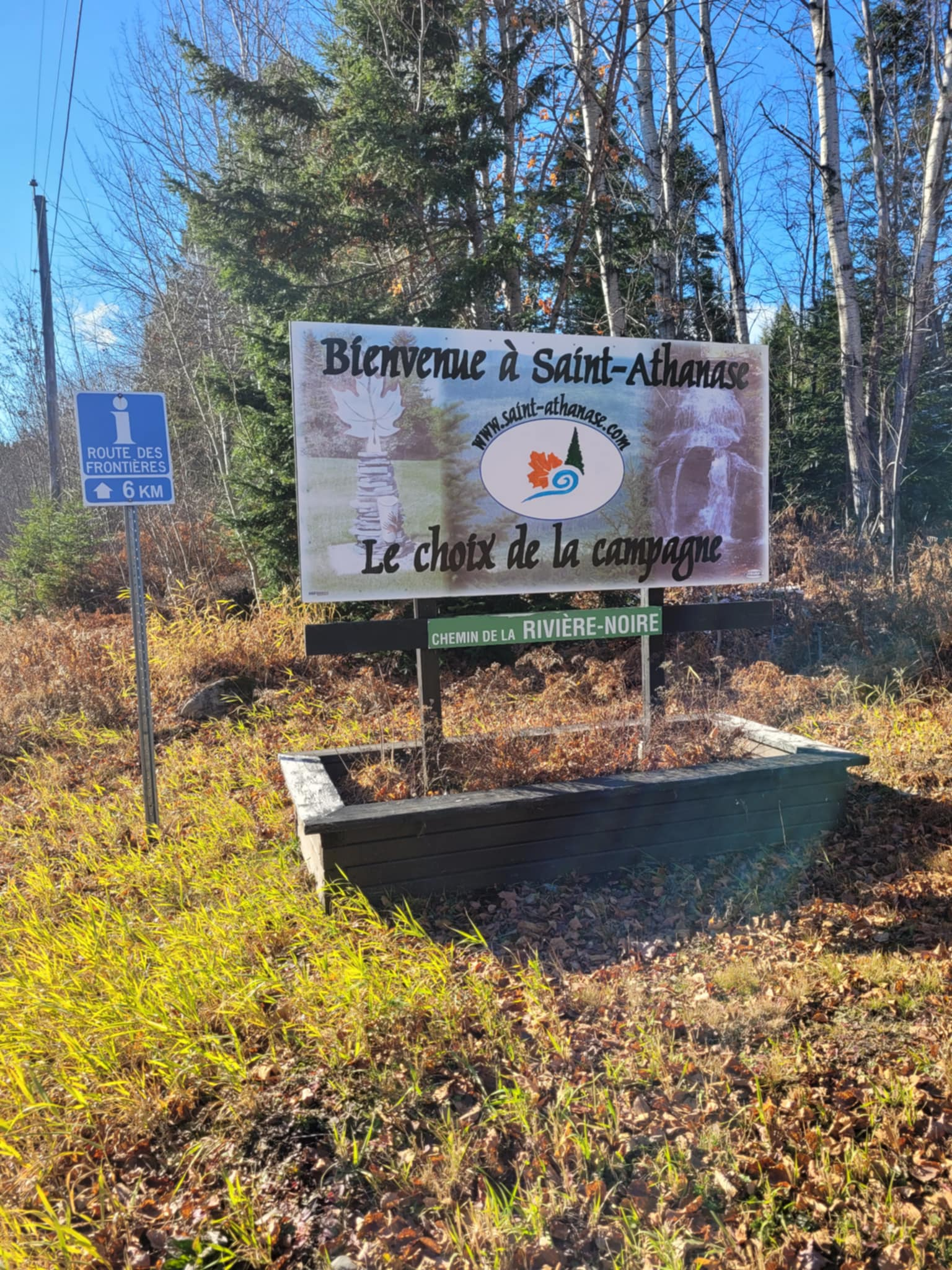
- Saint-Athanase entrance sign

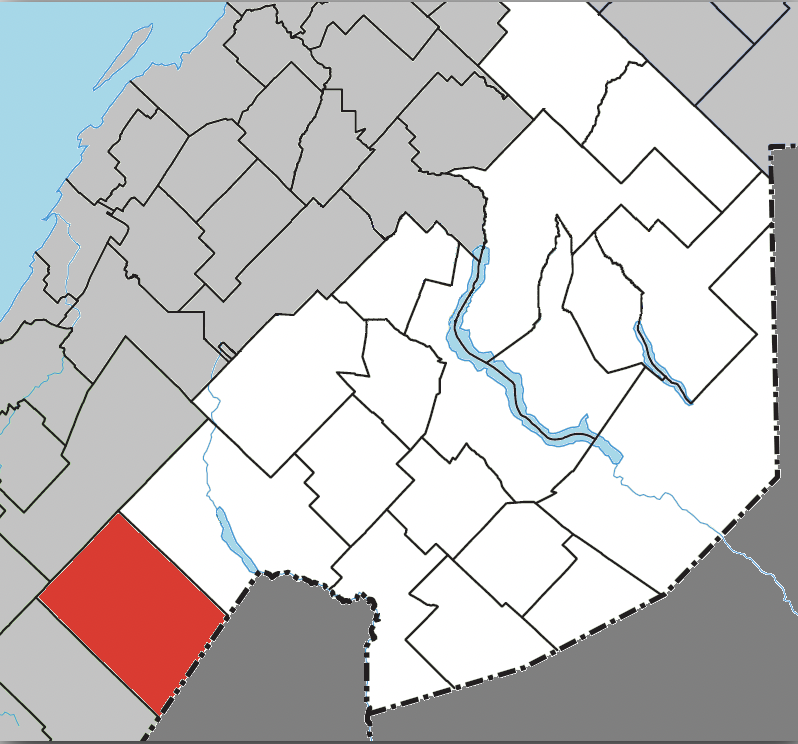
- Location within Témiscouata RCM

- Location in eastern Quebec
- Coordinates: 47°26′N 69°25′W
- Country: Canada
- Province: Quebec
- Region: Bas-Saint-Laurent
- RCM: Témiscouata
- Constituted: January 1, 1955

Government
  - Mayor: Mario Patry
  - Federal riding: Côte-du-Sud—Rivière-du-Loup—Kataskomiq—Témiscouata
  - Prov. riding: Rivière-du-Loup–Témiscouata–Les Basques

Area
  - Total: 290.90 km^{2} (112.32 sq mi)
  - Land: 292.63 km^{2} (112.99 sq mi)
- There is an apparent contradiction between two authoritative sources

Population (2021)
  - Total: 303
  - Density: 1/km^{2} (2.6/sq mi)
  - Pop 2016-2021: ▼4.4%
  - Dwellings: 171
- Time zone: UTC−5 (EST)
  - Summer (DST): UTC−4 (EDT)
- Postal code(s): G0L 2L0
- Area codes: 418 and 581
- Highways: No major routes
- Website: www.saint-athanase.com

Saint-Athanase (French pronunciation: [sɛ̃t‿atanaz]) is a municipality in Témiscouata Regional County Municipality in the Bas-Saint-Laurent region of Quebec, Canada, located on the Canada–United States border.

== Demographics ==
In the 2021 Census of Population conducted by Statistics Canada, Saint-Athanase had a population of 303 living in 136 of its 171 total private dwellings, a change of −4.4% from its 2016 population of 317. With a land area of 292.63 km^{2} (112.99 sq mi), it had a population density of 1.0/km^{2} (2.7/sq mi) in 2021.

=== Population ===
Canada census – Saint-Athanase community profile

| | 2021 | 2016 |
| Population | 303 (-4.4% from 2016) | 317 (+5.3% from 2011) |
| Land area | 292.63 km^{2} (112.99 sq mi) | 292.89 km^{2} (113.09 sq mi) |
| Population density | 1.0/km^{2} (2.6/sq mi) | 1.1/km^{2} (2.8/sq mi) |
| Median age | 46.8 (M: 45.2, F: 49.2) | 47.1 (M: 47.5, F: 44.8) |
| Private dwellings | 171 (total) | 191 (total) |
| Median household income | $53,600 | $46,592 |

References: 2021 2016

== See also ==
- West Branch Little Black River (Quebec–Maine), a stream
- Boucanée River, a stream
- List of municipalities in Quebec
