= Pohénégamook =

- City
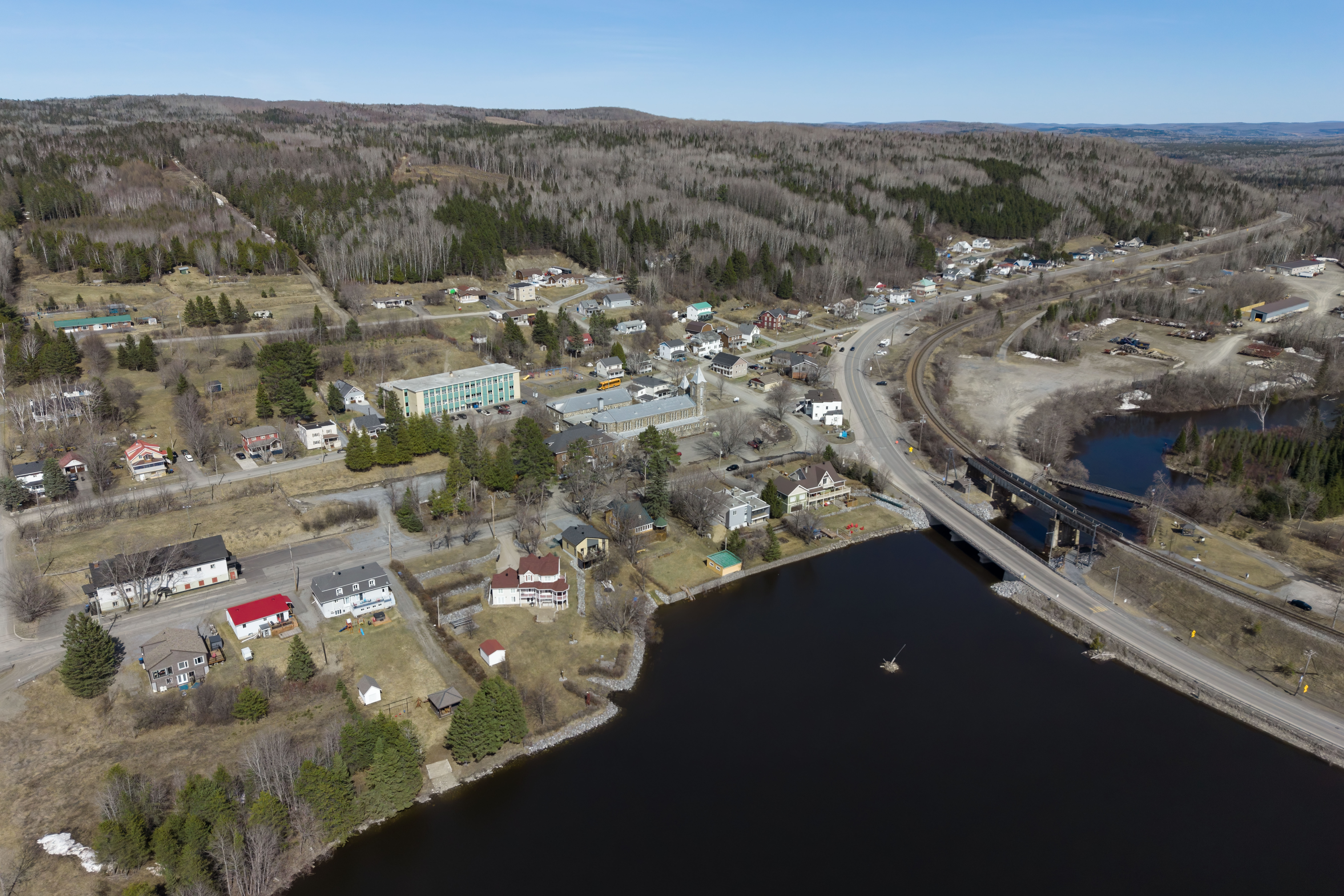
- Aerial view of Pohénégamook

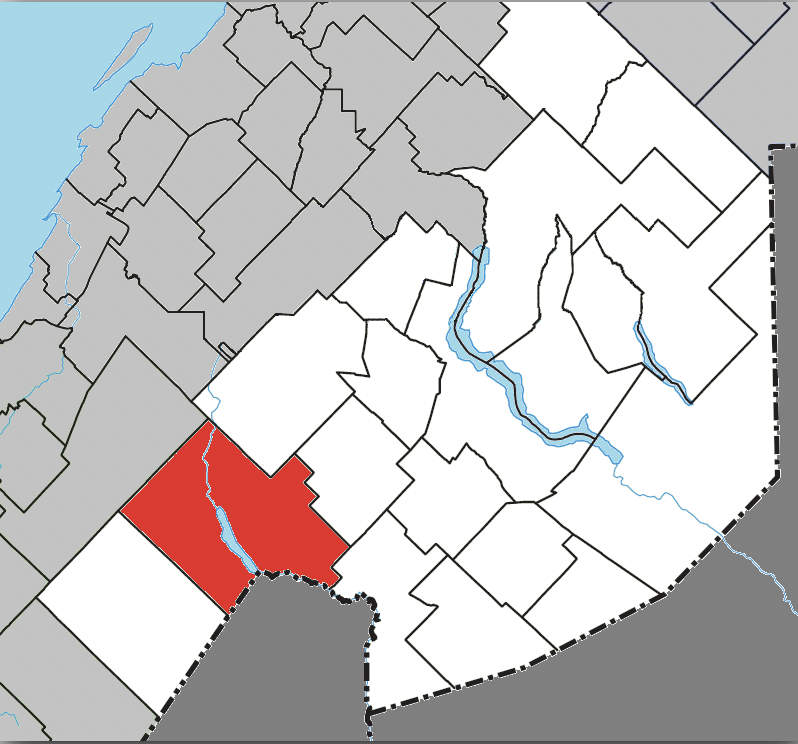
- Location within Témiscouata RCM

- Location in eastern Quebec
- Coordinates: 47°28′N 69°13′W
- Country: Canada
- Province: Quebec
- Region: Bas-Saint-Laurent
- RCM: Témiscouata
- Constituted: November 3, 1973

Government
  - Mayor: Benoît Morin
  - Federal riding: Côte-du-Sud—Rivière-du-Loup—Kataskomiq—Témiscouata
  - Prov. riding: Rivière-du-Loup–Témiscouata–Les Basques

Area
  - Total: 349.40 km^{2} (134.90 sq mi)
  - Land: 339.99 km^{2} (131.27 sq mi)

Population (2021)
  - Total: 2,481
  - Density: 7.3/km^{2} (19/sq mi)
  - Pop 2016-2021: ▼3.9%
  - Dwellings: 1,393
- Time zone: UTC−5 (EST)
  - Summer (DST): UTC−4 (EDT)
- Postal code(s): G0L 1J0
- Area codes: 418 and 581
- Highways: R-289
- Website: www.pohenegamook.net

Pohénégamook (French pronunciation: [pɔeneɡamok]; pop. 2481) is a Canadian town on the Canada–United States border in Quebec's Témiscouata Regional County Municipality.

The town shares the border with Estcourt Station, Maine, the northernmost point in New England.

As of 2021, Pohénégamook had 2,481 people, down 3.9% from the last census in 2016.

The town is named after Lake Pohenegamook and is located on the lake's southern and western shores.

== History ==
Pohénégamook was amalgamated with the formerly-independent communities of Saint-Pierre d'Estcourt, Saint-Éleuthère, Village-Blier and Saint-David-de-Sully on October 23, 1973.

== Demographics ==
In the 2021 Census of Population conducted by Statistics Canada, Pohénégamook had a population of 2,481 living in 1,171 of its 1,393 total private dwellings, a change of −3.9% from its 2016 population of 2,582. With a land area of 339.99 km^{2} (131.27 sq mi), it had a population density of 7.3/km^{2} (18.9/sq mi) in 2021.

Historical Census Data - Pohénégamook, Quebec
Year	Pop.	±%
1976	3,627	—
1981	3,702	+2.1%
1986	3,526	−4.8%
1991	3,248	−7.9%
1996	3,259	+0.3%
2001	3,097	−5.0%
2006	2,940	−5.1%
2011	2,770	−5.8%
2016	2,585	−6.7%
2021	2,481	−4.0%

=== Language ===
Mother tongue (2021)

Language	Population	Pct (%)
French only	2,460	99.2%
English only	10	0.4%
English and French	0	0.0%
Non-official languages	5	0.2%

== Attractions ==
Parc de la Frontière, located along the southern lakeshore of Lake Pohenegamook, straddles the U.S.-Canadian border. It features a historic marker and gives visitors the experience of visiting a park in two countries.

== See also ==
- Lake Pohenegamook, a waterbody
- Boucanée River, a stream
- List of towns in Quebec
