= Chimenticook River =

Coordinates: 47°02′44″N 69°19′49″W

Location
- Country: United States
- State: Maine

Physical characteristics
- Source
  - location: Aroostook County, Maine, United States
  - elevation: 320 m (1,050 ft)
- Mouth
  - location: Aroostook County, Maine, United States
  - elevation: 214 m (702 ft)
- Length: 32.6 km (20.3 mi)
- Discharge
  - location: Saint John River (Bay of Fundy)

The river Chimenticook is a tributary of the Saint John River (Bay of Fundy), flowing in the canton T13 R13 Wels, in the Aroostook County, in North of Maine, in United States.

Its course is in forest area in a valley enclosed by high mountains, in the southeast of the US border. Its course is situated between the river Powock (northeast side) and "Twomile Brook" (West side).

The river side of the river is accessible by Chimenticook some forest roads.

== Geography ==
The upper part of the "River Chimenticook" begins in Notre Dame Mountains at the mouth of the East Lake (length: 9.2 kilometres (5.7 mi); height: 315 metres (1,033 ft)) in Aroostook County (Maine). This Canadian lake surrounded by mountains has two parts connected by a strait, and only 0.4 kilometres (0.25 mi) of its length (southeast part) is in American territory. This lake is mainly fed by the River Spikes (Kamouraska) (from the West) and the "ruisseau Blanc" (White Brook) (coming from the North).

The mouth of the East Lake flows through the southeast and is located at:

- 0.4 kilometres (0.25 mi) southeast of the border between Quebec and Maine;
- 18.0 kilometres (11.2 mi) northwest from the confluence of the river Chimenticook;
- 48.1 kilometres (29.9 mi) southeast of the Route 132 at La Pocatiere, Quebec, in Quebec.

From the mouth of the East Lake, the Chimenticook river flows on 32.6 kilometres (20.3 mi) as follows:

- 0.5 kilometres (0.31 mi) to the South, to the northwest shore of the "Little East Lake";
- 1.7 kilometres (1.1 mi) to the Southeast through the "Little East Lake" (length: 9.2 kilometres (5.7 mi); height: 319 metres (1,047 ft)) up at its mouth located in the Southeast;
- 6.5 kilometres (4.0 mi) to the Southeast, to the deck of a forest road;
- 9.2 kilometres (5.7 mi) to the Southeast, to the deck of a forest road;
- 5.5 kilometres (3.4 mi) to the Southeast, to the confluence of the river.

The "Chimenticook River" flows into a river curve on the north shore of Saint John River, Canton T16 R13 Wels, the Aroostook County. This confluence is located at:

- 20.6 kilometres (12.8 mi) West of the Allagash hamlet, located on the south shore of St. John River;
- 4.7 kilometres (2.9 mi) upstream of the confluence of the river Pocwock;
- 17.3 kilometres (10.7 mi) downstream of the confluence of the Big Black River.

== Toponymy ==
The term "Chimenticook" is original Abenaki.

== See also ==
- Mount Carmel, a municipality of Quebec
- Kamouraska Regional County Municipality (RCM)
- Aroostook County, a county Maine
- Rivière aux Pointes (Kamouraska) (Spikes River)
- List of rivers of Quebec
- List of rivers of Maine
