= Quebec Route 289 =

Highway in Quebec, Canada

Route 289

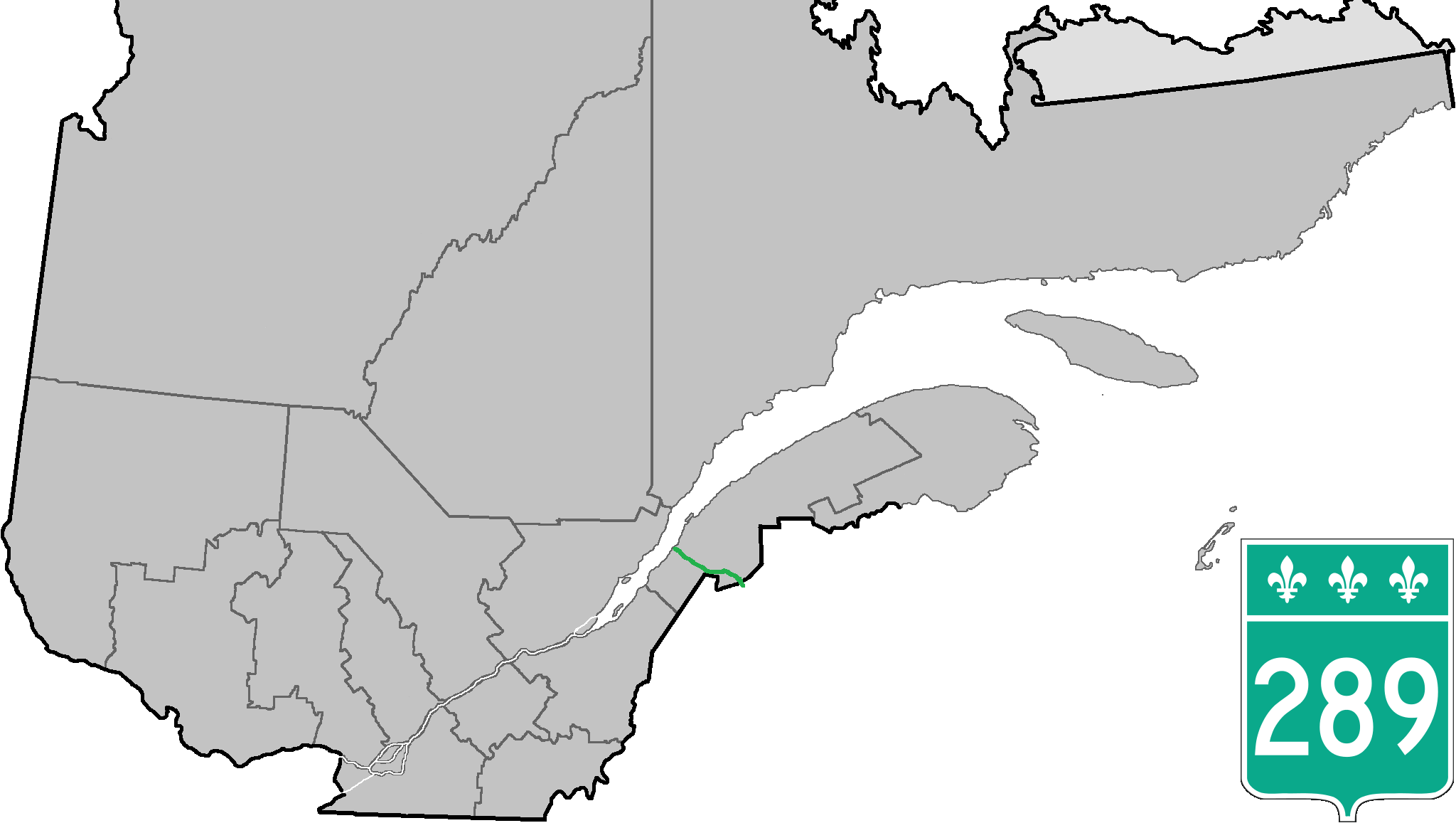

Route information
- Maintained by Transports Québec
- Length: 94.8 km (58.9 mi)

Major junctions
- South end: Route 120 at Lac-Baker (New Brunswick)
- R-232 near Riviere-Bleue; A-20 (TCH) near Saint-Alexandre-de-Kamouraska; R-230 Saint-Alexandre-de-Kamouraska
- North end: R-132 near Saint-André-de-Kamouraska

Location
- Country: Canada
- Province: Quebec
- Major cities: Pohénégamook

Highway system
- Quebec provincial highways; Autoroutes; List; Former
← R-287	→ R-291

Route 289 is a two-lane north/south highway on the south shore of the Saint Lawrence River in the Bas-Saint-Laurent region of eastern Quebec, Canada. Its northern terminus is in Saint-André-de-Kamouraska at the junction of Route 132 and the southern terminus is at the border of New Brunswick where it continues as Route 120.

Route 289 is also designated as the "route des Frontières" tourism highway.

== List of towns along Route 289 ==
- Saint-Marc-du-Lac-Long
- Riviere-Bleue
- Pohénégamook
- Saint-Alexandre-de-Kamouraska
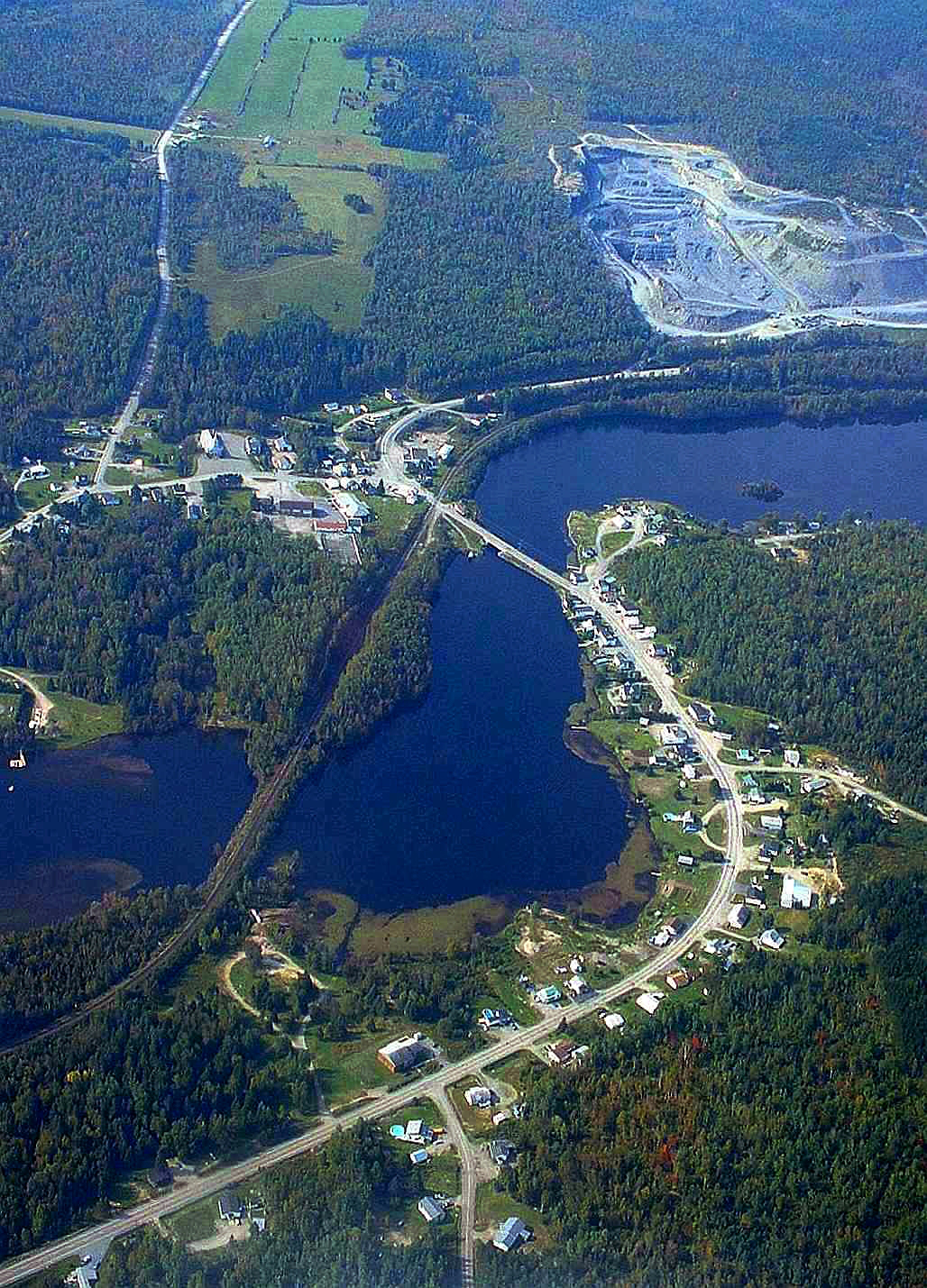
Route 289 meanders through Saint-Marc-du-Lac-Long.

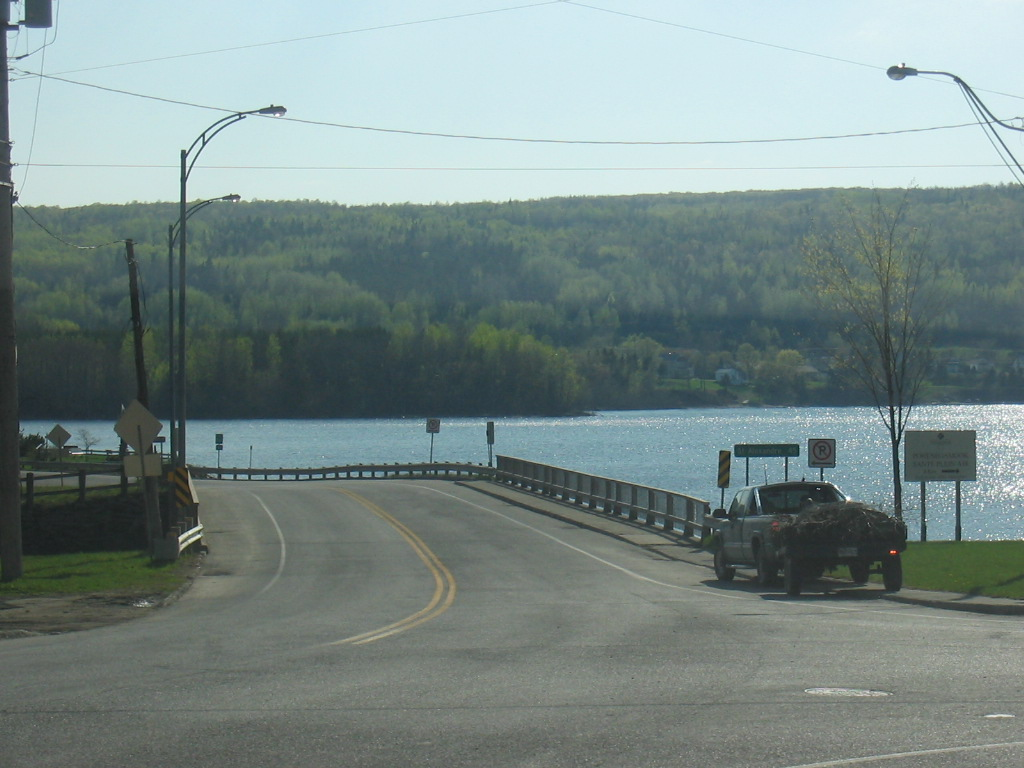
Quebec Route 289 at Pohénégamook

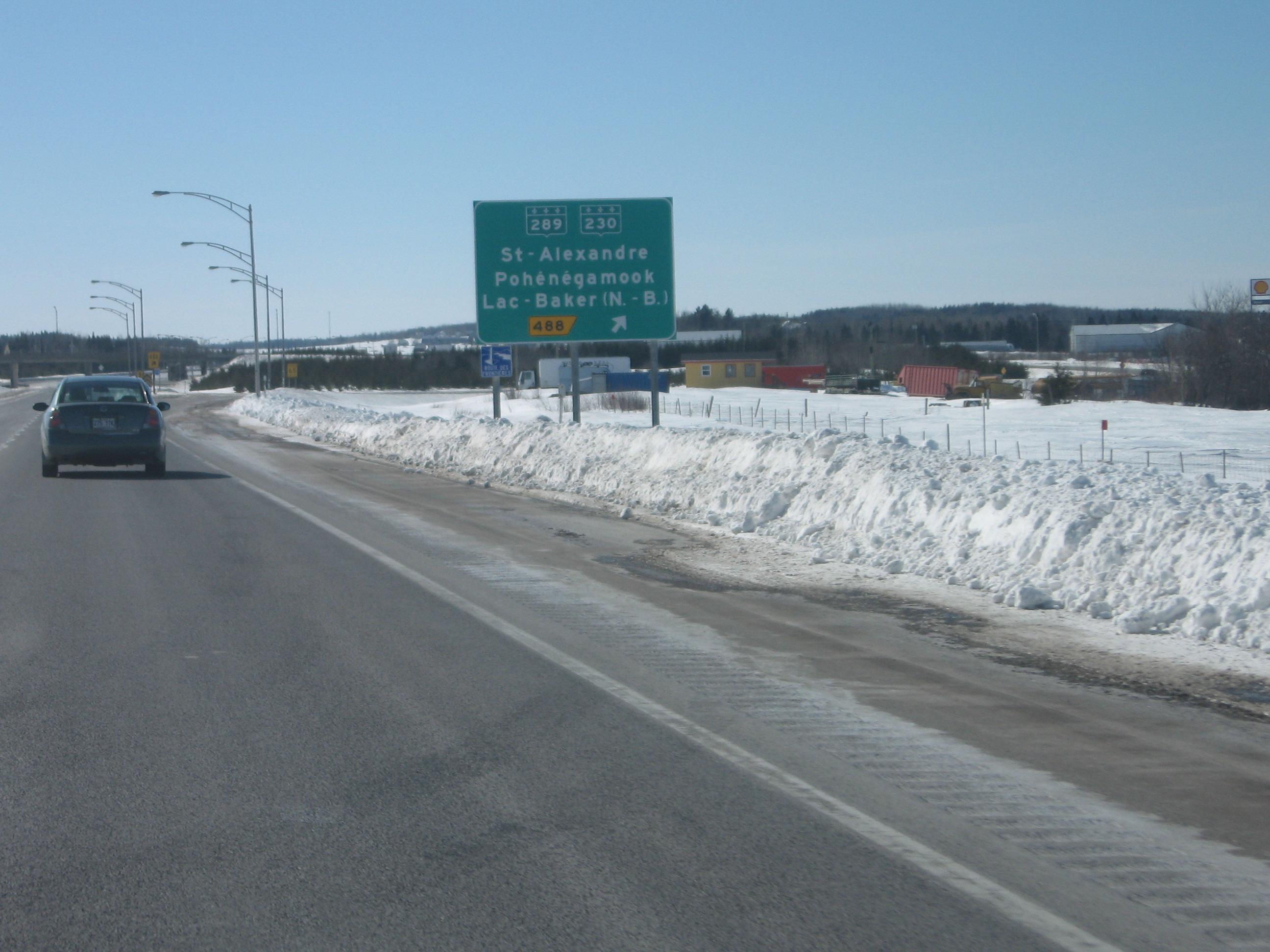
Interchange with Autoroute 20 in Saint-Alexandre.

== See also ==
- List of Quebec provincial highways
