= Project Head Start =

Project Head Start may refer to:

- The Head Start Program, an anti-poverty program of the United States
- Operation Head Start, an operation of the United States Air Force
