= Searsport–Loring Pipeline =

American fuel pipeline

Location
- Country: United States
- Start: Searsport, Maine; 44.4575°N 68.9021°W
- Passes through: Bangor, Maine; 46.9495°N 67.8889°W
- To: Loring Commerce Centre

General information
- Type: Jet fuel
- Owner: Bangor Natural Gas
- Decommissioned: 1994

Technical information
- Length: 200 mi (320 km)

The Searsport–Loring Pipeline is a defunct underground pipeline that formerly delivered jet fuel from the Searsport Terminal to Loring Air Force Base. Following the closure of the base, the pipeline was proposed for being the location of a fiber optic cable, as well as for reuse in a proposed refinery at the Loring Commerce Centre. In 2012, the pipeline was purchased by Bangor Natural Gas at auction.
