= W W Warner =

W W Warner may refer to:

- Bill Warner (motorcycle racer) (1969 - 2013), American motorcycle racer
- William Ward Warner (1867 - 1950), British military officer and politician
- William W. Warner (1920 – 2008), American biologist and writer
