= Bill Warner (motorcyclist) =

American motorcycle racer

- Warner on his 311.9 mph speed record motorcycle (2011)
- Born: February 11, 1969; Little Falls, New York
- Died: July 14, 2013 (aged 44)
- Cause of death: Motorcycle accident
- Education: Marine biology, chemistry. University of Tampa
- Occupation: Tropical fish farmer
- Known for: Motorcycle land speed record

William Walter "Bill" Warner (February 11, 1969 – July 14, 2013) was an American motorcycle racer who set a land speed record on a conventional motorcycle in 2011. He was killed in a motorcycle racing crash in 2013.

Warner was born in Little Falls, New York. He studied marine biology and chemistry at the University of Tampa. Warner was a tropical fish farmer in Wimauma, Florida. On July 17, 2011, riding a highly modified turbocharged Suzuki Hayabusa, Warner set a new world motorcycle land speed record of 311.945 mph (502.027 km/h) from a standing start to 1.5 miles (2.4 km) at the Loring Timing Association's Land Speed Race, at the Loring Commerce Centre (the former Loring Air Force Base) in Limestone, Maine.

Bill Warner began land speed racing his unfaired, normally aspirated 1,650 cc (101 cu in) Yamaha V-max in March 2007, with a run in Maxton, North Carolina, which placed him in the East Coast Timing Association (ECTA) Maxton 200 MPH Club. He purchased an unfaired turbo Suzuki Hayabusa in 2008, and quickly set the fastest unfaired motorcycle records in land speed racing, eventually reaching 255 mph (410 km/h) in 2010 at the Texas Mile. The same year, Warner built, with the consultation of Bonneville motorcycle racer Larry Forstall, a set of Modified-class fiberglass fairings for his Hayabusa. With this bodywork, plus sponsorship and managerial support from Walt Kudron, he set the Maxton track record on the standing mile at the ECTA meet in May 2010, going 272.374 mph (438.343 km/h). In addition to the Maxton track record, Warner holds track records at the Texas Mile at Goliad, Texas (278 mph (447 km/h)), Loring (311 mph) and California's Mojave Air and Space Port (274.8 mph (442.2 km/h)) land speed sanctions.

After going 278 mph in a mile on a Modified-class land speed motorcycle, Warner began building a new, Altered-class chassis, engine, and bodywork in order to attempt to break the 300 mph (480 km/h) barrier on a conventional (rider-exposed) motorcycle. This undertaking was supported by many industry and personal sponsors, and absorbed all of Warner's time and energy. After breaking 300 on his first attempt in 2011, running 311.945 miles per hour (502.027 km/h) on a 1.5 mile track, Warner sought to break 300 mph in a single mile, after which he planned to retire from ultimate land speed racing, auction his racing motorcycle, and manage his own standing-mile land speed event in Houston, Texas.

On July 14, 2013, while attempting to break 300 mph in a single mile at the Loring Timing Association land speed meet, Warner lost control of his motorcycle at 285 mph (459 km/h). His motorcycle veered off the course and struck a 6" concrete landing light pedestal and he was thrown a great distance. Warner was conscious after the crash, but he was pronounced dead at Cary Medical Center in Caribou, Maine. He had achieved 296 mph (476 km/h) in a mile at the event in less than optimal conditions. The cause of the accident is unclear, but investigators suspected mechanical or tire failure. He was survived by his parents, brother, and sister.
