= Loring International Airport =

Airport in northeast Maine, US

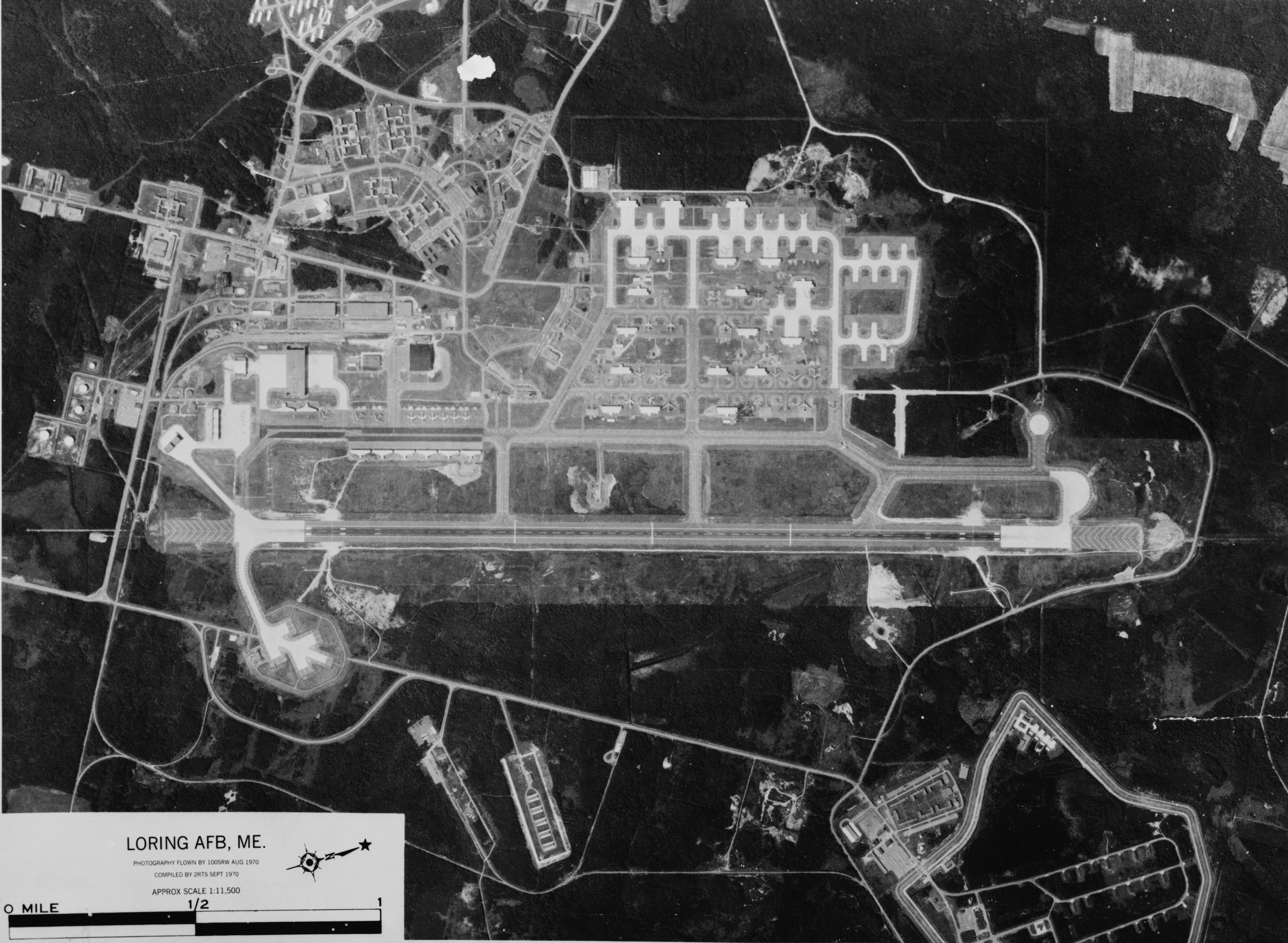
- 1970 aerial photograph of Loring Air Force Base
- IATA: LIZ; ICAO: none; FAA LID: ME16

Summary
- Airport type: Private
- Owner: Loring Development Authority
- Location: Limestone, Maine
- In use: 1997-Present
- Elevation AMSL: 745 ft / 227 m
- Coordinates: 46°57′00″N 67°53′00″W
- Website: http://loring.org/
- Interactive map of Loring International Airport

Runways
| Direction | Length | | Surface |
| Direction | ft | m | Surface |
|---|---|---|---|
| 1/19 | 12,101 | 3,688 | Asphalt/concrete |
- Source: http://www.airnav.com/airport/ME16

Loring International Airport is the operational name of the airfield at the former Loring Air Force Base in Limestone, Maine, United States. It is currently (as of August 2022) operated by the Loring Commerce Centre. The airfield itself sits on 1,600 acres of land and is kept in good condition.

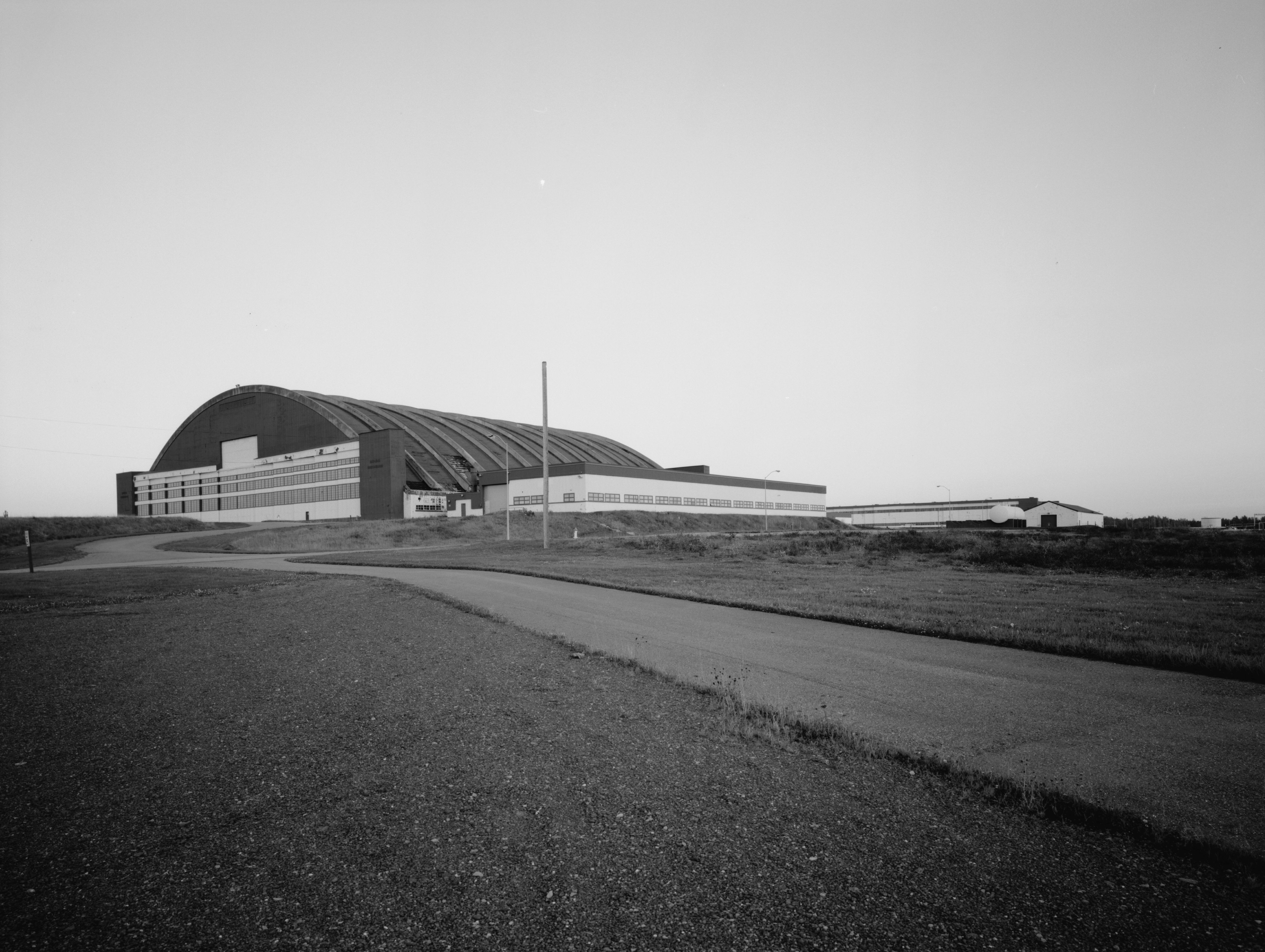
Looking southeast towards the hangar

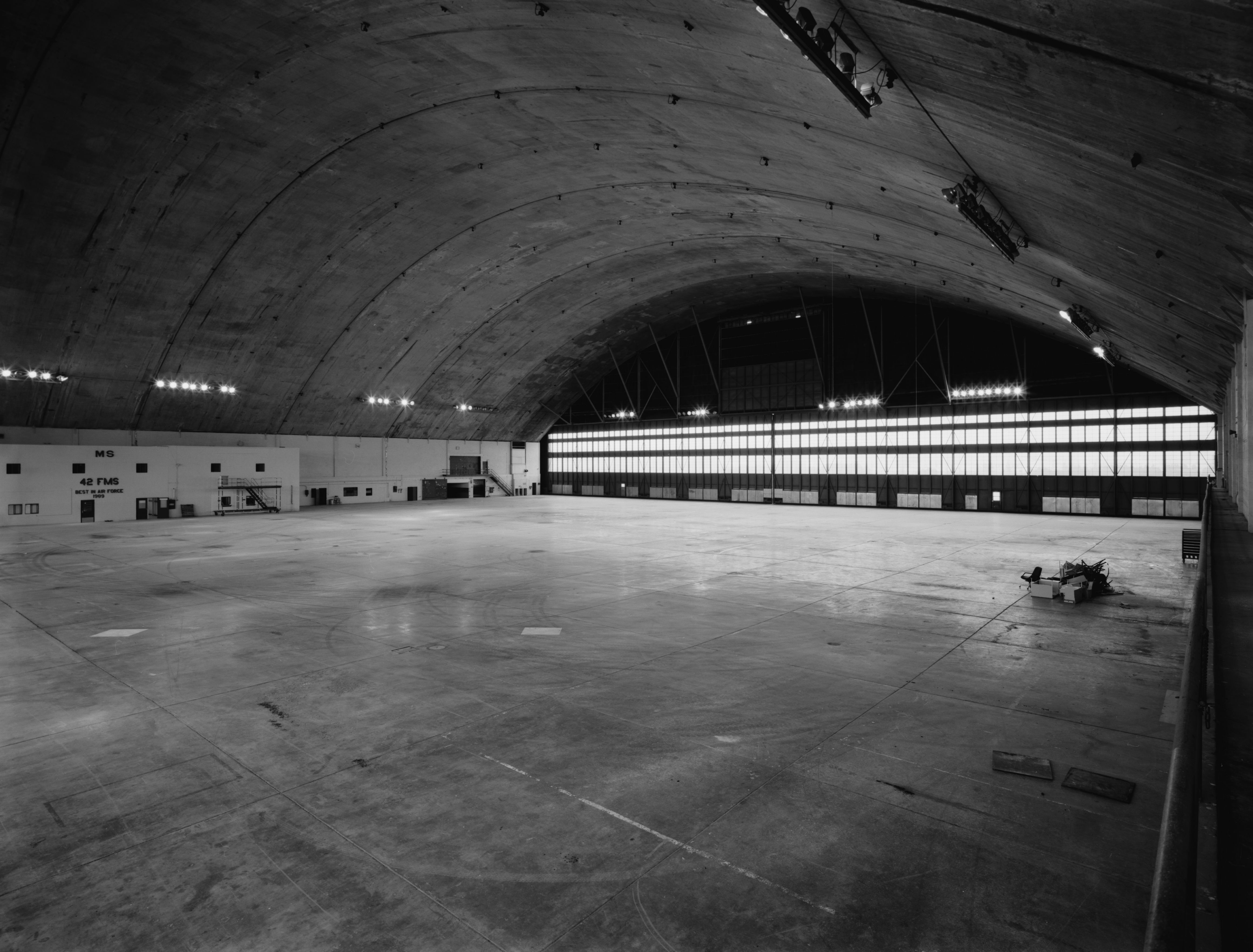
Inside the hangar

The Loring Air Force Base Arch Hangar is a hangar constructed by the United States Air Force as part of Loring Air Force Base. It was constructed at the same time as the base's double cantilever hangar. The arch hangar was the largest monolithic arch structure in the United States at the time of its completion.

== See also ==
- List of airports in Maine
