= 42nd Air Refueling Squadron =

US Air Force unit

42d Air Refueling Squadron
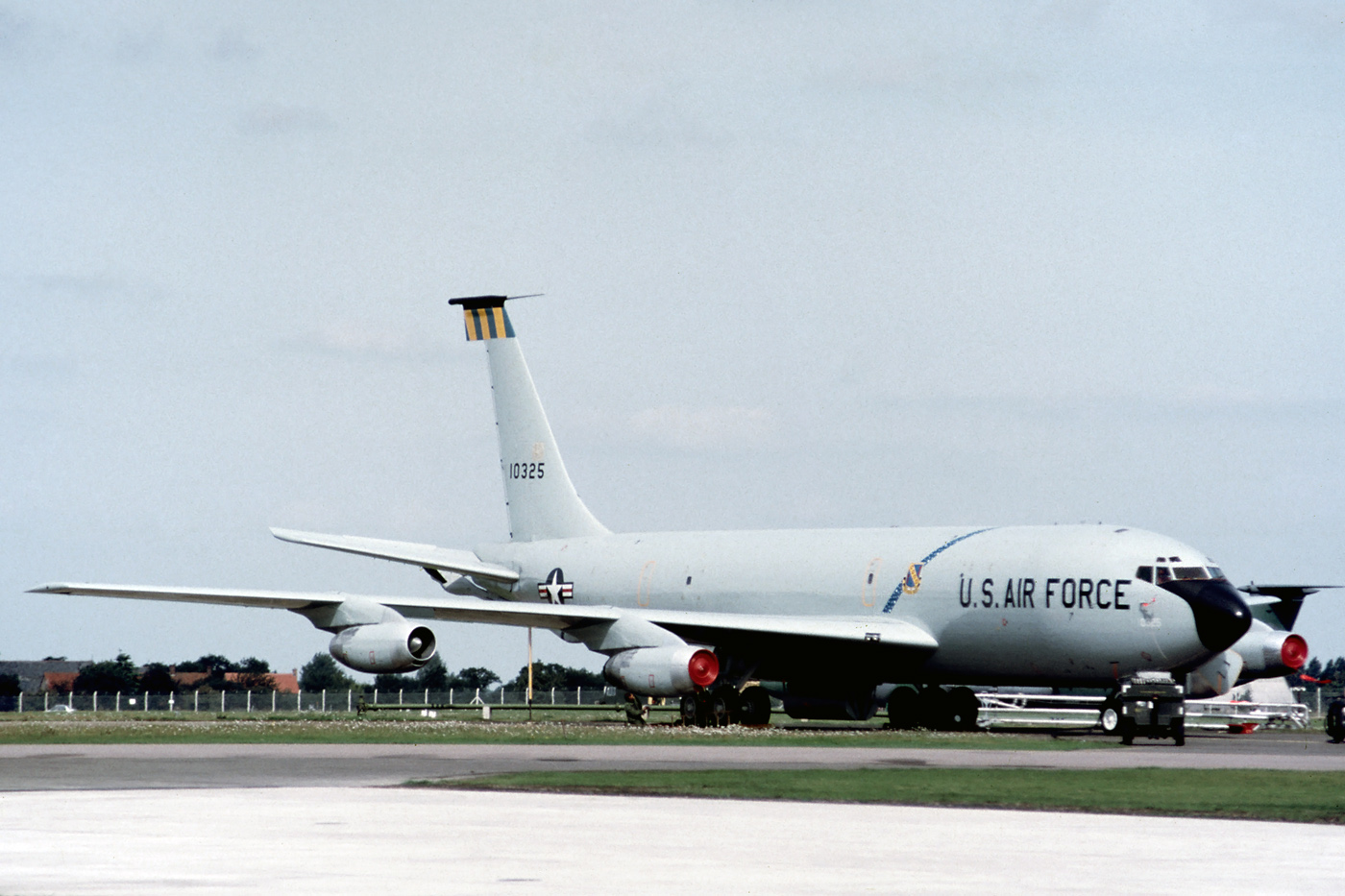
- Squadron KC-135A Stratotanker
- Active: 1942–1944; 1955–1994
- Country: United States
- Branch: United States Air Force
- Role: Aerial refueling
- Mottos: Ready Willing (&) Able
- Decorations: Air Force Outstanding Unit Award

Insignia
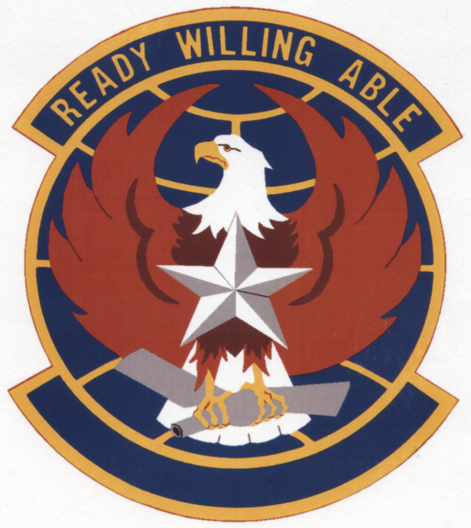
- 42d Air Refueling Squadron emblem (Note: Approved 20 July 1984.)

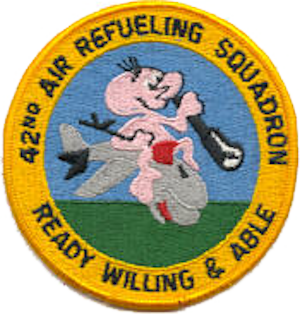
- Patch with 42d Air Refueling Squadron emblem (early)

The 42d Air Refueling Squadron is an inactive United States Air Force unit. It was last assigned to the 42d Bombardment Wing at Loring Air Force Base, Maine, where it was inactivated on 30 April 1994.

The squadron's earliest predecessor was the 542d Bombardment Squadron, which served as a heavy bomber training unit during World War II and was inactivated in a general reorganization of Army Air Forces training units in 1944.

The 42d Air Refueling Squadron was activated in 1955 at Loring. Although initially equipped with Boeing KC-97 Stratofreighters, it soon reequipped with Boeing KC-135 Stratotankers. It provided worldwide refueling until inactivated in 1994 as Loring was closed.

== History ==
=== Heavy bomber training ===
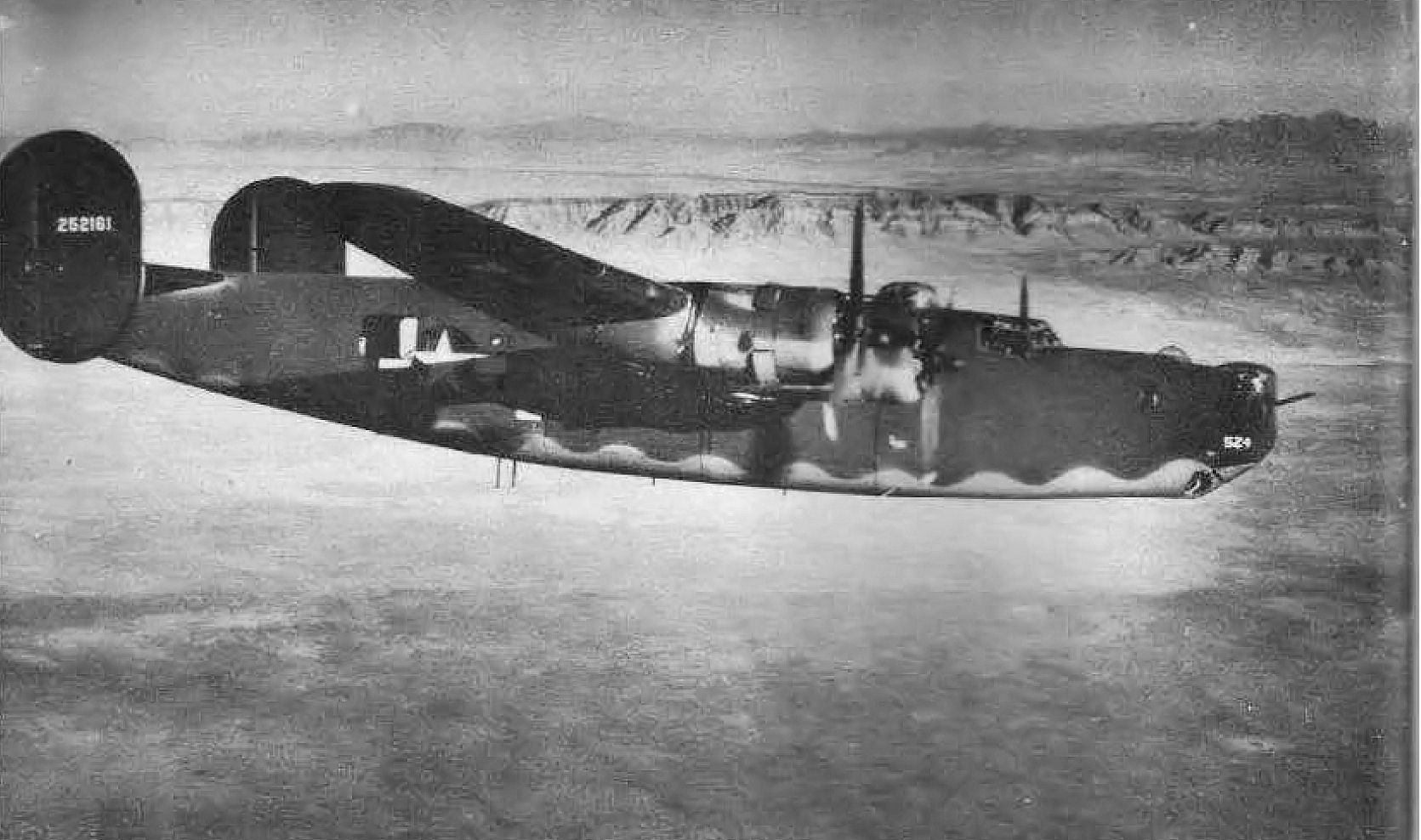
B-24 Liberator of a training unit in the southwest

The first predecessor of the squadron was the 542d Bombardment Squadron, which was activated at Salt Lake City Army Air Base, Utah as one of the four original squadrons of the 383d Bombardment Group. Its cadre moved to Rapid City Army Air Base a little over a week later, where it began to equip as a Boeing B-17 Flying Fortress Operational Training Unit (OTU) the following year. OTUs were oversized parent units that provided cadres to "satellite groups"

In October 1943, the squadron moved to Peterson Field, Colorado, where it flew Consolidated B-24 Liberator and changed its mission to become a Replacement Training Unit (RTU). Like OTUs, RTUs were oversized units, but their mission was to train individual aircrews. However, the AAF was finding that standard military units like the 542d, which were based on relatively inflexible tables of organization were not well adapted to the training mission. Accordingly, it adopted a more functional system in which each base was organized into a separate numbered unit, which was manned and equipped for the specific training mission. As a result, the 383d Group, its elements and supporting units were inactivated or disbanded and replaced by the 214th AAF Base Unit (Combat Crew Training School, Heavy), which was simultaneously organized at Peterson.

=== Air refueling operations ===
==== KC-97 era ====
The 42d Air Refueling Squadron was activated at Limestone Air Force Base on 18 January 1955 and assigned to the 42d Bombardment Wing. Although designated as a heavy squadron, it was equipped with Boeing KC-97 Stratofreighters. The squadron received its first KC-97 in February and was fully equipped by the end of the following month. When it was activated, its parent wing was equipped with the Convair B-36 Peacemaker, which did not have an air refueling capability, so it focused on providing refueling support for other Strategic Air Command (SAC) units. SAC had begun to include refueling in its war plans, and the squadron frequently deployed its tankers to forward locations, or deployed as a squadron, placing it ahead of the faster Boeing B-47 Stratojets it would refuel, and on their programmed route. It deployed to Thule Air Base, Greenland; Sidi Slimane Air Base, French Morocco; and Ernest Harmon and Goose Air Bases, Labrador.

==== Conversion to KC-135s ====
In August 1957, the squadron became nonoperational, as it began transferring its KC-97s to other units. The arrival of replacement Boeing KC-135 Stratotankers, originally scheduled for August was delayed. The first of the new planes did not arrive until October, and the squadron did not reach full strength until April 1958 and did not become combat ready until May. The bomber squadrons of the 42d Wing had begun to equip with Boeing B-52 Stratofortress aircraft, and the KC-135 could deliver twice the amount of fuel to the B-52 without the fuel consumption caused by the descent and climb required to refuel with the KC-97. In June 1958, squadron planes began standing alert. The percentage of SAC planes on alert gradually grew over the next two years. Starting in 1960, one third of the squadron's aircraft were maintained on fifteen minute alert, fully fueled to reduce vulnerability to a Soviet missile strike. This was increased to half the squadron's aircraft in 1962.

==== Cuban Missile Crisis ====
Soon after detection of Soviet missiles in Cuba, On 22 October 1962, 1/8 of SAC's B-52s were placed on airborne alert. SAC placed additional KC-135s on alert to replace KC-135s devoted to maintaining the B-52 bomber force on airborne alert. On 24 October SAC went to DEFCON 2, placing all aircraft on alert. Forward tankers at Loring were organized as a tanker task force. Tanker crews from the 42d flew 214 air refueling missions during the crisis. As tensions eased, on 21 November, SAC returned to normal airborne alert posture and went to DEFCON 3. Dispersed tankers were recalled on 24 November. On 27 November SAC returned to normal alert posture.

==== Refueling support in Southeast Asia and elsewhere ====
In 1965, the squadron began to deploy aircraft and aircrew support for Operation Young Tiger operations in Southeast Asia. This support for other units refueling combat operations in Southeast Asia continued until 1975.

On 5 September 1983, members of the 42d escorted a flight of McDonnell F-4E Phantom IIs deploying across the Atlantic to a base in Germany. One of the Phantoms experienced failure of one engine, and its second engine began to overheat. It was diverted to Gander Airport, Newfoundland, but could not maintain level flight. Crew E-113 managed to connect its boom to the Phantom's refueling receptacle and literally tow the fighter back up to 10,000 feet above sea level. The refueling was further complicated by the partial loss of hydraulics by the fighter, which caused it to fly while yawing. The tanker refueled the fighter four times at speeds one hundred knots slower than normal refueling speed, with both planes near their stalling speed. For its actions, crew E-113 received the Mackay Trophy from the National Aeronautic Association for the most meritorious flight of the year, and the Kalberer Trophy for the "Most Outstanding Single Feat of Military Airmanship" by a SAC crew.

In 1989, the squadron provided crews and tankers to support Operation Just Cause, the incursion into Panama to replace Manuel Noriega's government. The squadron provided this support while converting from the KC-135A to the KC-135R. The first "R" model KC-135 arrived in May 1989, but the full conversion took around 12 months.

During Desert Shield and Desert Storm, the squadron deployed aircrew and tankers to Lajes Air Base, Azores, where it provided all aircrew and aircraft for the first three weeks of the operation. It also deployed personnel to France, Egypt, Saudi Arabia, Oman, and Diego Garcia.

In September 1991, SAC implemented the Air Force's Objective Wing organization and the squadron was assigned to the newly-formed 42d Operations Group. This assignment would last less than two years. After SAC was disestablished in 1992, Air Mobility Command assumed air refueling operations and the squadron was reassigned to the 380th Operations Group. However, the 1991 Base Realignment and Closure Commission had recommended the closure of Loring. The last KC-135R left Loring on 2 March 1994, and the squadron inactivated on 30 April.

== Lineage ==
542d Bombardment Squadron

- Constituted as the 542d Bombardment Squadron (Heavy) on 28 October 1942

Activated on 3 November 1942
Inactivated on 1 April 1944
Consolidated with the 42d Air Refueling Squadron as the 42d Air Refueling Squadron on 19 September 1985

42d Air Refueling Squadron

- Constituted as the 42d Air Refueling Squadron, Heavy on 29 November 1954

Activated on 1 September 1955
Consolidated with the 542d Bombardment Squadron on 19 September 1985
Redesignated 42d Air Refueling Squadron on 1 September 1991
Inactivated on 30 April 1994

=== Assignments ===
- 383d Bombardment Group, 3 November 1942 – 1 April 1944
- 42d Bombardment Wing, 8 January 1955 (attached to Thule Task Force, 2 November–28 December 1955; 5th Air Division, 6–19 March 1956; Thule Task Force, 28 December 1956 – 7 March 1957; 4082d Strategic Wing, 1 July–5 October 1959)
- 42d Operations Group, 1 September 1991
- 380th Operations Group, c. 1 June 1993 – 30 April 1994

=== Stations ===
- Salt Lake City Army Air Base, Utah, 3 November 1942
- Rapid City Army Air Base, South Dakota, 12 November 1942
- Ainsworth Army Air Field, Nebraska, 13 December 1942
- Rapid City Army Air Base, South Dakota, 26 April 1943
- Geiger Field, Washington, 20 June 1943
- Peterson Field, Colorado, c. 26 October 1943 – 1 April 1944
- Limestone Air Force Base (later Loring Air Force Base), Maine, 18 January 1955 – 30 April 1994

Deployed to: Thule Air Base, Greenland, 2 November–28 December 1955; Sidi Slimane Air Base, French Morocco, 6–19 March 1956; Thule Air Base, Greenland, 28 December 1956 – 7 March 1957; Goose Air Base, Labrador, 1 July–5 October 1959

=== Aircraft ===
- Boeing B-17 Flying Fortress, 1943
- Consolidated B-24 Liberator, 1943–1944
- Boeing KC-97 Stratofreighter, 1955–1957
- Boeing KC-135 Stratotanker, 1957–1991

=== wards and campaigns ===
Award streamer	Award	Dates	Notes
	Air Force Outstanding Unit Award	1 July 1986-30 June 1988	42d Air Refueling Squadron

Campaign Streamer	Campaign	Dates	Notes
	American Theater without inscription	3 November 1942 – 1 April 1944	542d Bombardment Squadron

== See also ==
- B-17 Flying Fortress units of the United States Army Air Forces
- B-24 Liberator units of the United States Army Air Forces
