= Operation Round Robin =

US Air Force cold war operation

Operation Round Robin was an operation of the United States Air Force that was designed to evaluate aircraft cross-servicing procedures and combined air tactics.

== See also ==
- Operation Head Start
- Operation Chrome Dome
- Thule Monitor Mission
- Operation Giant Lance
