= Searsport Terminal =

Coordinates: 44°27′27.47″N 68°54′7.53″W

Searsport Terminal is a port in Searsport, Maine. Searsport provides tanker offloading and temporary storage services for crude oil transportation. The terminal is also home to the beginning for the Searsport-Loring Pipeline.
