= Loring Commerce Centre =

Coordinates: 46.94°N 67.9°W

Location in Maine
Location in the United States

The Loring Commerce Centre is an industrial and aviation park in northeastern Maine, located in Aroostook County near Limestone. Developed from the former Loring Air Force Base which closed in 1994, it is home to over 20 employers with more than 1,300 employees. The center consists of over 3,800 acres (15 km^{2}) of fully serviced commercial, industrial, and aviation development sites in addition to numerous existing modern and practical buildings in a spacious, campus-like setting. The former airfield is operated as Loring International Airport.

== History ==
The centre was chartered by Maine State legislature in 1993 as the Loring Development Authority of Maine as a body corporate and politic and a public instrumentality of the state, and as a municipal corporation. It is the first in a series of municipal corporations chartered by The Maine legislature in special acts of legislation to serve as "instrumentalities of the state" when military bases located in Maine were closed. Following in the same model is The Midcoast Regional Redevelopment Authority

On the site of the base, the Loring Development Authority created the Loring Commerce Centre on 9,472-acre (38.33 km^{2}) of land. It was marketed as an "...excellent solution for your business real estate needs at a very reasonable cost." Through the efforts of the authority, 1,400 jobs have been created, more than replacing the 1,000 civilian jobs that were lost when the base closed. Tenants such as Bigelow Aerospace maintained a small satellite tracking station on the grounds as well. SAIC is developing an uncrewed blimp at the base as well, and Sitel also maintains a call center at Loring. In addition to the Sitel site, other various call centers exist on the base, as well as food processing, forestry operations, light manufacturing, and aviation services. The Canadian professional services company Stantec also has an office at Loring. Finally, the Loring Air Museum, a museum dedicated to preserving the history and legacy of the base, is located in the base's former bank.

The military has also made a return to Loring over the years. The Defense Finance and Accounting Service Limestone, a major component of the Defense Finance and Accounting Service office consolidated 26 offices into 5 and this was one of the consolidation points. This facility is located in the old base hospital, which was constructed after the earthquake in the 1980s. The Maine Military Authority refurbished Humvees for the United States Army and Marine Corps in partnership with Loring Industries inside one of the base's large hangars until the contract ran out. Additionally, the Air Force Real Property Agency is in the process of conducting the distribution of resources at Loring. The federal government has also returned with the United States Department of Labor creating a Job Corps center, with the aim of helping to prepare teenagers for careers in culinary arts, medical support and other growth industries. As of 2002, the Air Force Real Property Agency considered Loring to be one of its recent success stories.

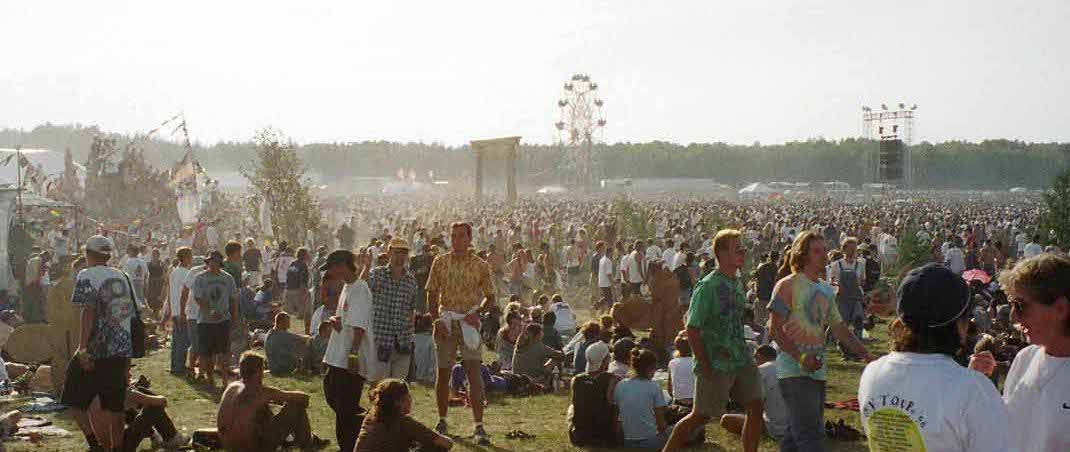
A photo of Lemonwheel, looking towards the stage

Post-base usage is not limited to just business. The airfield was used by the popular jam-band Phish to hold its massive festival concerts: "The Great Went" in 1997, the Lemonwheel in 1998 and "It" in 2003. Estimated attendance was 65,000 concert-goers, and Phish was the only band. Fans camped on-site in tents, creating a community of fans that became the second-largest city in Maine during all three events.

The Aroostook National Wildlife Refuge, run by the United States Fish and Wildlife Service on 4,700 acres (19 km^{2}) of the base property was established in 1998. The refuge consists of the former weapons area, which operated as Caribou Air Force Station from 1951 until 1962, when it was absorbed into Loring.

== Runway and control tower ==
The runway has become home to land-speed racing events, where participants use its runway for timing trials. In recent years Loring's runway has been home to speed venues such as the Loring Timing Association, the Cumberland Motor Club and the National Speed Shootout. In July 2011 Bill Warner of Wimauma, Florida, driving a turbocharged Suzuki motorcycle, set a new world record of 311.945 miles per hour. Warner was killed in a crash on the runway in July 2013.

Loring's air traffic control tower remains standing, but was closed following the closure of Loring AFB. However, the airfield's navigational aids such as the VOR/DME and ILS remain operational. Additionally, the airfield is now operated by the Commerce Centre as Loring International Airport.

== Tenants ==
Users of the facility include:

- US Fish & Wildlife Aroostook National Wildlife Refuge - administers 4,700 acres (19 km^{2}) of the base property
- Bigelow Aerospace
- British Cycle Supply Company
- Bunker Inn
- DFAS Limestone, one of the five offices of the Defense Finance and Accounting Service
- Frontier Transport
- Inland Winds Housing
- Lattice Technology Group, Inc.
- Limestone Country Club
- Loring Development Authority of Maine
- Loring Industries, LLC
- Loring Air Museum
- D.R. MacDonald Enterprises, Inc.
- SFE Manufacturing, Inc.
- TRP Trucking Parts
- US Department of Labor Loring Job Corps Center, Inc.

In November 2022, DG Fuels signed a long-term lease for 1,240 acres of land that is a part of the former base. DG is planning to break ground on a $4 billion sustainable aviation fuel facility in the summer of 2024, with an expected facility completion in 2027.

The Loring Development Authority recognizes the need for protection of its infrastructure and tenants.

== See also ==
- Loring International Airport
- Loring Air Force Base
