= 407th Air Refueling Squadron =

Inactive US Air Force unit

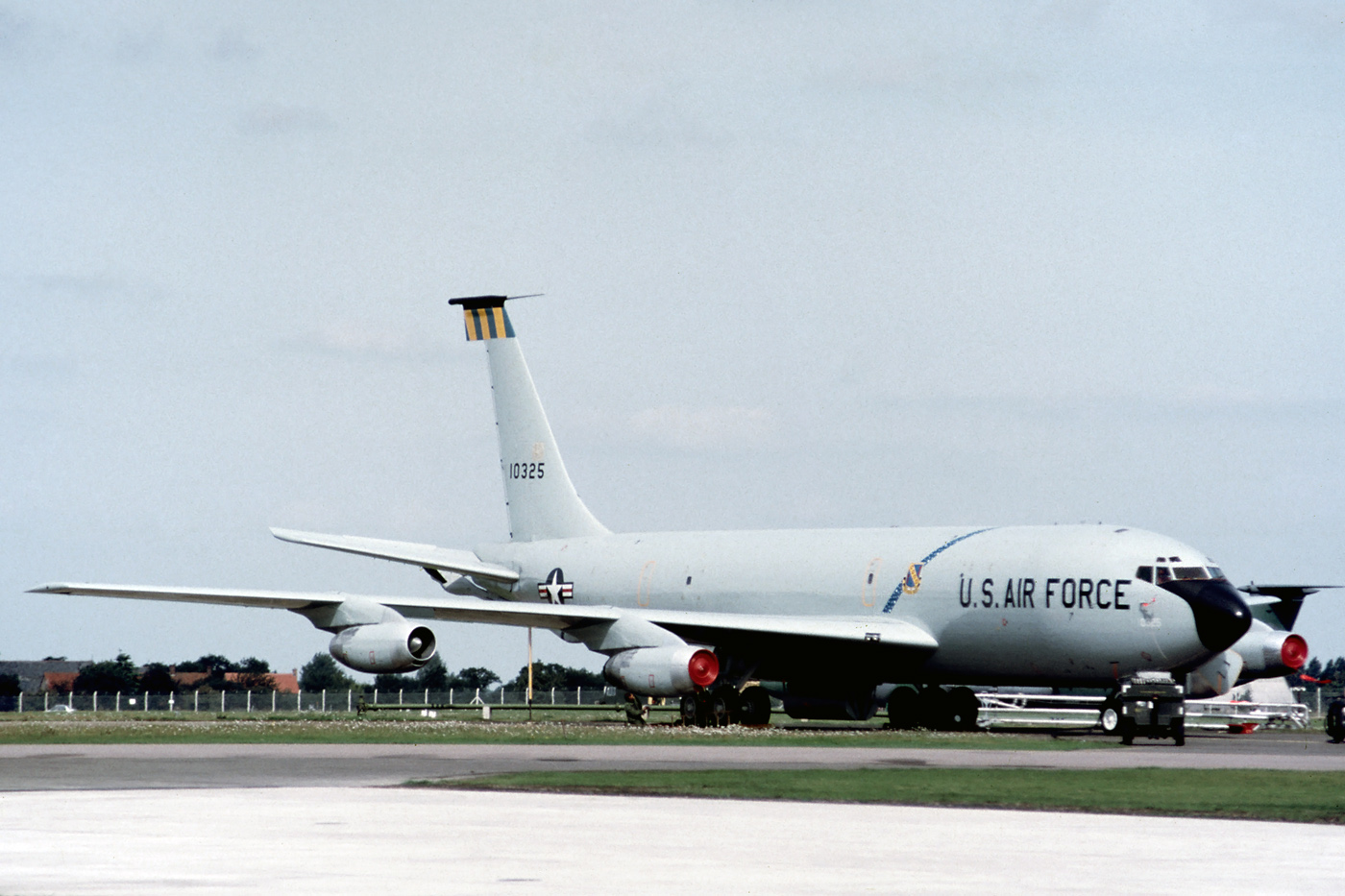
- KC-135 Stratotanker of the 42d Bombardment Wing (Note: Aircraft is Boeing KC-135A-BN Stratotanker, serial number 61-325. Taken at RAF Mildenhall on 7 September 1986. This plane was converted to KC-135R configuration. This airplane went to the Aerospace Maintenance and Regeneration Center on 29 September 1993 and later served with the Republic of Singapore Air Force. Baugher, Joe (8 February 2023). "1961 USAF Serial Numbers". Joe Baugher.)
- Active: 1942–1946; 1953–1961; 1962–1990
- Country: United States
- Branch: United States Air Force
- Role: Heavy bomber, aerial refueling
- Engagements: European Theater of Operations
- Decorations: Distinguished Unit Citation; Air Force Outstanding Unit Award

Insignia
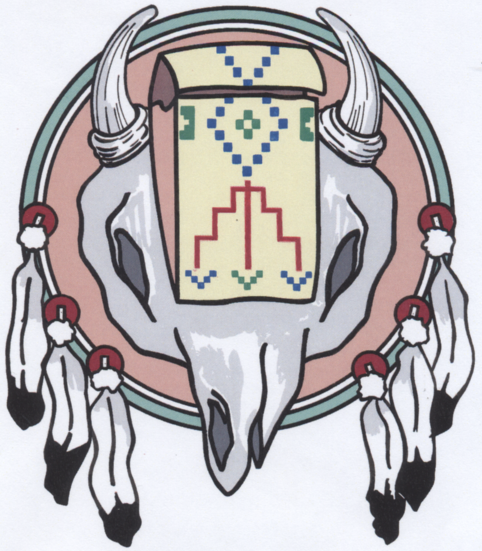
- 407th Air Refueling Squadron emblem (Note: Description: An Assiniboin Indian tribe ceremonial shield of the grass dance, a ritual of the gods of plenty, in shades of tan, white, black, and green, pendanted with six feathers in shades of gray, red, black, and white; surmounting the shield a buffalo skull, in its proper colors, charged with a parfleche pouch, in its proper colors; the pouch marked with a symbolic design in bright shades of green, red, and blue. Significance: The emblem is symbolic of the squadron and the Assiniboin Indian tribe of Montana, where the squadron was organized in 1953. The three feathers on the left symbolize the character of the squadron personnel: skill, alertness, and pride, while the character of the Strategic Air Command is symbolized by the three feathers on the right: strength, vigilance, and steadfastness. The buffalo skull, used by the Assiniboin Indians in spiritual ceremonies, symbolizes power and plenty. Their parfleche pouch, used to transport meat and pemmican in their travels and to warriors in combat, symbolizes the function of the squadron. Lineage & Honors History.)

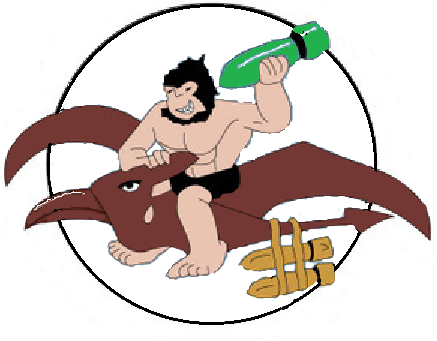
- 407th Bombardment Squadron emblem (Note: Approved 3 June 1943. Description: Over and through a white disc, thin border black, the comic strip character "Alley Oop" proper, grasping a large green aerial bomb in left hand and riding on the back of a purple pterodactyl, having two large orange aerial bombs suspended from the tail.)
- World War II fuselage code: PY

The 407th Air Refueling Squadron is an inactive United States Air Force unit. It was last assigned to the 42nd Bombardment Wing at Loring Air Force Base, Maine, where it was inactivated on 1 October 1990.

The first predecessor of the squadron was activated as the 17th Reconnaissance Squadron in March 1942. It was redesignated the 407th Bombardment Squadron the following month. After participating in the antisubmarine campaign while training, it moved to the United Kingdom in August 1942, where it became a training unit for heavy bombers. From May 1943, it participated in the strategic bombing campaign against Germany. It earned two Distinguished Unit Citation for its actions. After V-E Day, it moved to France, performing airlift missions until it was inactivated in 1946.

The squadron's second predecessor, the 407th Air Refueling Squadron, was activated in 1953 and supported Strategic Air Command's (SAC) fighters until they were transferred to Tactical Air Command, then primarily SAC bomber units until inactivating in 1961. It was activated again in 1962 with jet tankers. The squadron deployed aircrews and aircraft to support the war in Southeast Asia from the late 1960s until 1975. The two units were consolidated in 1985.

== History ==
=== World War II ===
==== Initial organization and training ====
The squadron's first predecessor was activated at Barksdale Field, Louisiana on 1 March 1942, as the 17th Reconnaissance Squadron, one of the four original squadrons of the 92nd Bombardment Group. Manned like the three bombardment squadrons of the group, it was designated for the long range reconnaissance mission. Since a reorganization of General Headquarters Air Force in September 1936, each bombardment group of the Army Air Forces (AAF) had an assigned or attached reconnaissance squadron, which operated the same aircraft as that group's assigned bombardment squadrons. That arrangement continued for units that were designated as heavy units.

Later that month it moved to MacDill Field, Florida and trained with Boeing B-17 Flying Fortresses. While training in Florida, the squadron also flew antisubmarine patrols off the Florida coast. While at MacDill, its distinction from the group's other squadrons ended, and in April, it became the 407th Bombardment Squadron. The air echelon departed Sarasota Army Air Field for Westover Field, Massachusetts on 19 June 1942, flying on to Dow Field, Maine on 29 June. The squadron then ferried their B-17s across the North Atlantic via Newfoundland starting between 12 and 15 August. They flew directly from Newfoundland to Prestwick Airport, Scotland. The 92nd Group was the first to fly their bombers non-stop across the Atlantic. (Note: The 97th Bombardment Group had flown its planes across the Atlantic with stops in Greenland and Iceland. Freeman, pp. 6-7.) The 407th was the last of the group's squadrons to complete the move, with its last plane arriving at RAF Bovingdon on 28 August. Meanwhile, the ground echelon left Bradenton on 18 July, arriving at Fort Dix, New Jersey in the New York Port of Embarkation two days later. It sailed aboard the USS West Point (AP-23) on 2 August and docked at Liverpool on 18 August, moving to Bovingdon the same day.

==== Operations in the European Theater ====
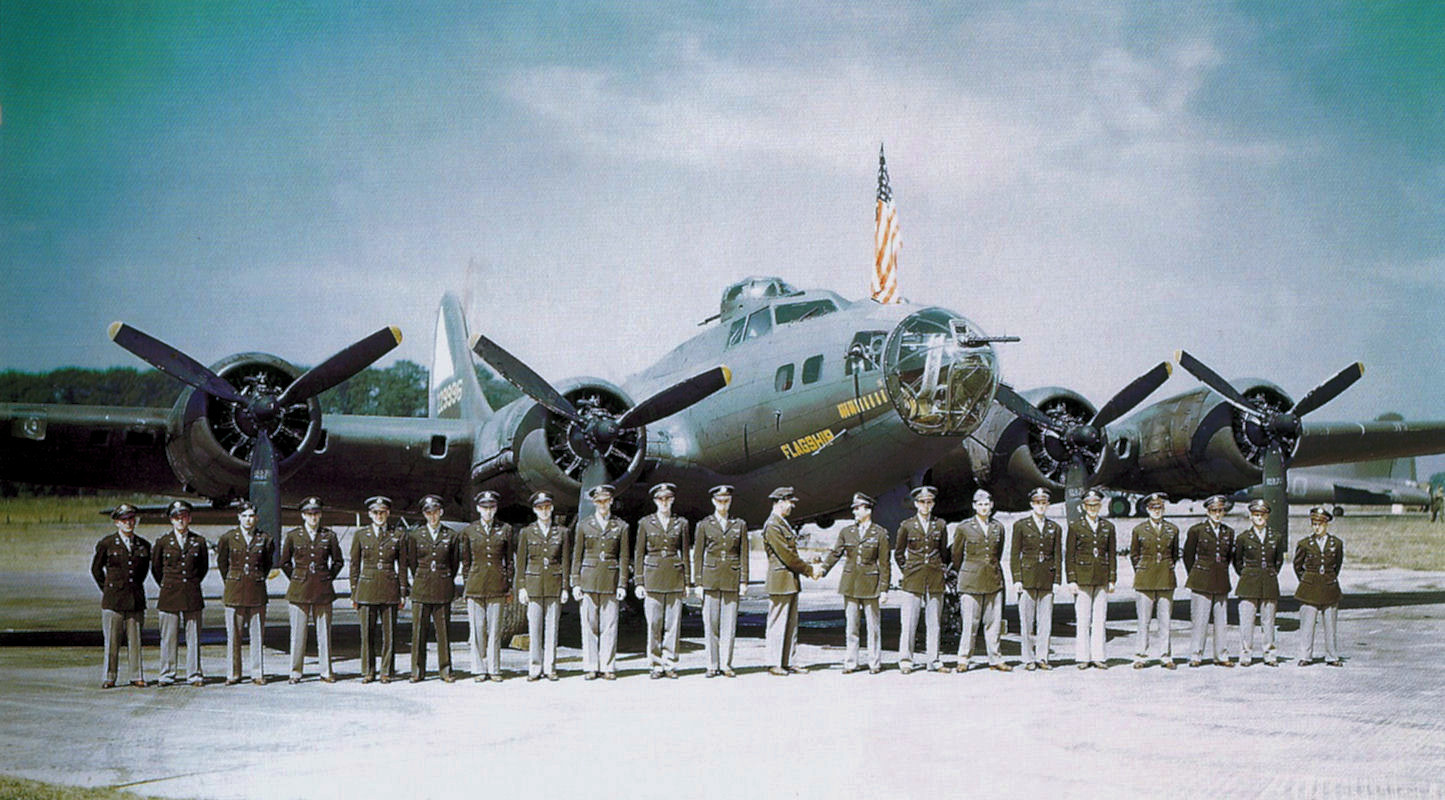
92d Group Pilots in front of a B-17 of the 407th Squadron (Note: Aircraft is Boeing B-17F-80-BO, serial 42-29996 "Flag Ship" at Alconbury. This aircraft was lost on 16 November 1943, commanded by 2Lt Joseph F Thornton, of the crew; 1 evaded capture, 9 became POWs. Missing Aircrew Report 1384.)

The buildup of Eighth Air Force in England required the establishment of a combat crew replacement and training center, but a lack of qualified personnel and aircraft hampered its development. As a result, the decision was made to use the 92nd Group and its squadrons as a temporary crew training unit, acting as the main component of what became the 11th Combat Crew Replacement Center Group. However, the 92d was the first group to arrive in England with improved B-17Fs, and with the training mission came an exchange of these newer models for the older B-17Es of the 97th Bombardment Group to use in training. On 6 September, to provide the squadron with combat experience, it flew its first combat mission against the Potez aircraft factory at Meaulte, France. Although remaining a replacement crew training unit until May 1943, the squadron initially flew occasional combat missions. In January 1943, he squadron moved to RAF Alconbury.

In May 1943, the squadron's training mission was transferred and the 407th began flying combat missions. Through May 1944 its targets included shipyards at Kiel, ball bearing plants at Schweinfurt, submarine pens at Wilhelmshaven, a tire manufacturing plant at Hannover, airfields near Paris, an aircraft factory at Nantes and a magnesium mine in Norway.

The squadron earned a Distinguished Unit Citation on 11 January 1944, when it successfully bombed aircraft manufacturing factories in Oschersleben, Germany despite adverse weather, a lack of fighter protection and heavy flak. It participated in Big Week, the intensive attack against German aircraft industry in late February 1944. It took part in Operation Crossbow, attacks on launch sites for V-1 flying bombs and V-2 rockets. It struck airfields and industrial sites in France, Belgium, the Netherlands, and Germany. After October 1944 it concentrated on transportation and oil industry targets. On 11 September, it earned a second DUC for a mission against petroleum facilities at Merseburg.

In addition to its strategic bombing mission, the squadron flew interdiction and air support missions. During Operation Overlord, the Normandy invasion, it attacked coastal defenses, transportation junctions and marshalling yards near the beachhead. It provided air support for Operation Cobra, the Allied breakout at Saint Lo, It bombed bridges and gun positions to support Operation Market Garden, the airborne attacks in the Netherlands near Arnhem, to secure bridgeheads across the Rhine in September. During the Battle of the Bulge, from December 1944 to January 1945, it attacked bridges and marshalling yards near the target area. During Operation Varsity, the airborne assault across the Rhine, it provided cover by bombing airfields near the drop zone. It flew its last combat mission on 25 April 1945, when the 92nd Group led the entire Eighth Air Force formation in an attack on Plzeň.

Following V-E Day, the squadron moved to Istres Air Base, France, where it participated in the Green Project, transporting troops returning to the United States, flying them to Cazes Field in Morocco until September, returning French servicemen to France on return trips. During the winter it flew displaced Greek nationals from Munich to Athens. It was inactivated in France on 28 February 1946 and its remaining personnel were absorbed into elements of the 306th Bombardment Group at Lechfeld Air Base, Germany.

=== Air refueling operations ===
==== Piston engine tanker operations ====
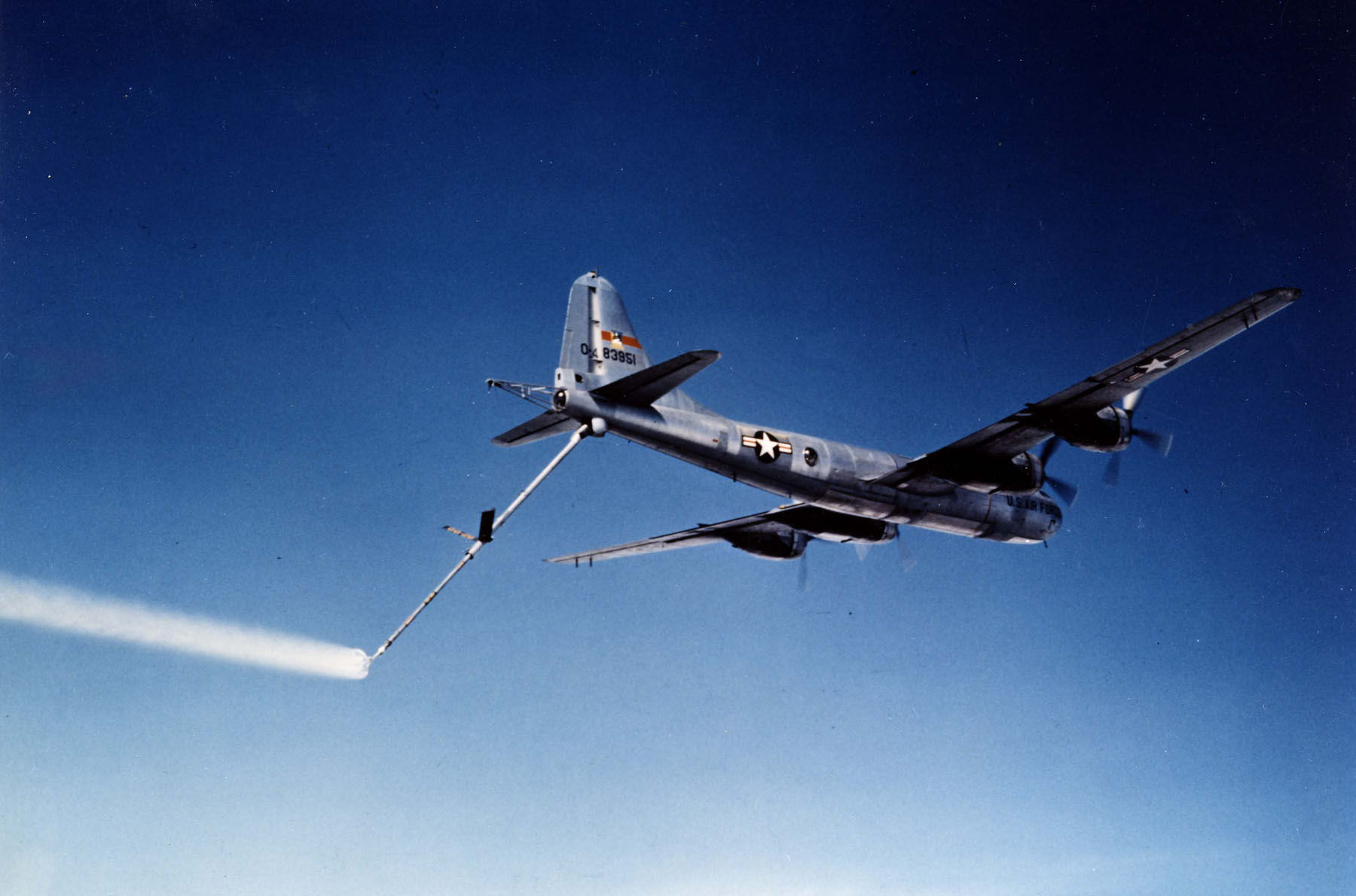
KB-29P, first tanker flown by squadron

The second predecessor of the squadron was activated as the 407th Air Refueling Squadron at Great Falls Air Force Base, Montana in December 1953 as an element of the 407th Strategic Fighter Wing, as the 407th Wing prepared for the transfer of Great Falls to Strategic Air Command (SAC) from Military Air Transport Service. Wing elements were not fully manned and it was June 1954 before the wing's flying units became fully operational. The squadron was equipped with Boeing KB-29 Superfortress tankers to refuel the 407th Wing's Republic F-84F Thunderstreak escort fighters. It participated in exercises and deployed crews and aircraft to various parts of the world. From August to November 1954, it deployed with the 407th Wing to Misawa Air Base, Japan to provide air defense of northern Japan.

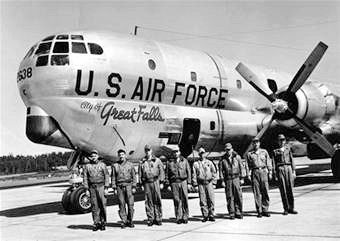
KC-97 of the 4061st Air Refueling Wing at Malmstrom AFB (Note: Aircraft is Boeing KC-97G-21-BO Stratofreighter "City of Great Falls", serial 52-838. Transferred to the Arizona Air National Guard, then to the Military Aircraft Storage and Disposal Center on 6 October 1972.)

In 1957, SAC's strategic fighter wings were inactivated or transferred to the Tactical Air Command (TAC) The 407th Wing inactivated on 1 July, and SAC formed the 4061st Air Refueling Wing to run Malmstrom (as Great Falls was now called) and command the 407th and 97th Air Refueling Squadrons there. The squadron mission now focused on refueling strategic bombers, and it converted to Boeing KC-97 Stratofreighters, continuing exercise support for SAC and deployments, including to Anderson Air Force Base, Guam, Elmendorf Air Force Base, Alaska and Royal Canadian Air Force bases in Canada. Deployments included Operation Reflex, which placed KC-97s and Boeing B-47 Stratojets at overseas bases closer to the Soviet Union for 90 day periods, although individuals rotated back to home bases during unit Reflex deployments The percentage of SAC planes on alert gradually grew over the next three years to reach its goal of one third of SAC’s force on alert by 1960. Malmstrom was becoming a missile base with early model Minuteman missiles. Plans were made to transfer the squadron to Ellsworth Air Force Base, South Dakota, but they were cancelled and the squadron and its parent wing were inactivated on 15 July 1961.

==== KC-135 operations ====
The 19th Bombardment Wing at Homestead Air Force Base, Florida had transferred its B-47s in late 1961 and was converting to the Boeing B-52 Stratofortress, starting to receive its new bombers in 1962. On 1 April 1962, the squadron was organized with Boeing KC-135 Stratotankers as the wing's refueling unit. In addition to exercise participation, and support for the 19th Wing's bombers, the squadron provided air refueling support for aircraft from other commands. Soon after detection of Soviet missiles in Cuba, SAC withdrew its forces from Homestead Air Force Base as the base became saturated with tactical forces. In what was called Operation Riders Up, with the exception of planes already on alert, the squadron's planes left Florida by 21 October. Alert planes left Homestead by 22 October. Additional KC-135 were placed on alert to replace KC-135s devoted to maintaining 1/8 of the B-52 bomber force on airborne alert. On 24 October SAC went to DEFCON 2, placing all aircraft on alert. Forward deployed tanker task forces were also augmented. On 27 November SAC returned to normal alert posture and began coordinating the return of its Florida planes to their home bases.

The squadron supported the airborne bomber force flying Operation Chrome Dome or "airborne alert training". The squadron supported bombers flying these missions and also maintained a ground alert commitment, that had increased to half the squadron's aircraft in 1962. Accidents at Palomares, Spain in January 1966 and near Thule in January 1968 contributed to the end of Chrome Dome, as did rapidly rising costs of the programs and the use of strategic bombers for non-nuclear missions in Southeast Asia, but the primary reason was the availability of a survivable intercontinental ballistic missile force.

In July 1968, SAC transferred Homestead to TAC. The 19th Wing moved to Robins Air Force Base, Georgia, replacing the 465th Bombardment Wing there, and absorbing its 912th Air Refueling Squadron. The 407th did not move with the wing, instead, it moved to Loring Air Force Base, Maine, where it became the second refueling squadron of the 42nd Bombardment Wing.

In addition to its alert and exercise commitments at Loring, the squadron provided crews and aircraft to SAC organizations flying combat operations in Southeast Asia. This support continued until 1975, after which the squadron resumed its alert, deployment, and exercise commitments. The two 407th squadrons were consolidated on 19 September 1985. The consolidated unit was inactivated in October 1990.

== Lineage ==
407th Bombardment Squadron

- Constituted as the 17th Reconnaissance Squadron (Heavy) on 28 January 1942

Activated on 1 March 1942
Redesignated 407th Bombardment Squadron (Heavy) on 22 April 1942
Redesignated 407th Bombardment Squadron, Heavy on 27 September 1944
Inactivated on 28 February 1946
Consolidated with the 407th Air Refueling Squadron as the 407th Air Refueling Squadron on 15 September 1985

407th Air Refueling Squadron
Constituted as the 407th Air Refueling Squadron, Strategic Fighter on 13 November 1953
Activated on 18 December 1953
Redesignated 407th Air Refueling Squadron, Medium on 15 September 1958
Discontinued and inactivated on 15 July 1961

- Redesignated 407th Air Refueling Squadron, Heavy and activated, on 26 January 1962 (not organized)

Organized on 1 April 1962
Consolidated with the 407th Bombardment Squadron on 15 September 1985
Inactivated on 1 October 1990

=== Assignments ===
- 92nd Bombardment Group, 1 March 1942 – 28 February 1946
- 407th Strategic Fighter Wing, 18 December 1953
- 4061st Air Refueling Wing, 1 July 1957 – 15 July 1961
- Strategic Air Command, 26 January 1962 (not organized)
- 19th Bombardment Wing, 1 April 1962
- 42nd Bombardment Wing, 2 July 1968 – 1 October 1990

=== Stations ===
- Barksdale Field, Louisiana, 1 March 1942
- MacDill Field, Florida, 26 March 1942
- Sarasota Army Air Field, Florida, 18 May – 18 July 1942
- RAF Bovingdon (AAF-112), England, 18 August 1942
- RAF Alconbury (AAF-102), England, 6 January 1943
- RAF Podington (AAF-109), England, 15 September 1943
- Istres Air Base (Y-17), France, c. May 1945 – 28 February 1946
- Great Falls Air Force Base (later Malmstrom Air Force Base), Montana, 18 December 1953 – 15 July 1961
- Homestead Air Force Base, Florida, 1 April 1962
- Loring Air Force Base, Maine, 2 July 1968 – 1 October 1990

=== Aircraft ===
- Boeing B-17 Flying Fortress, 1942–1946
- Boeing KB-29 Superfortress, 1953–1957
- Boeing KC-97 Stratofreighter, 1957–1961
- Boeing KC-135 Stratotanker, 1962–1990

=== Awards and campaigns ===
Award streamer	Award	Dates	Notes
	Distinguished Unit Citation	11 January 1944	Germany 407th Bombardment Squadron
	Distinguished Unit Citation	11 September 1944	Germany 407th Bombardment Squadron
	Air Force Outstanding Unit Award	1 July 1964–30 June 1965	407th Air Refueling Squadron
	Air Force Outstanding Unit Award	1 July 1967–30 June 1968	407th Air Refueling Squadron
	Air Force Outstanding Unit Award	1 July 1986–30 June 1988	407th Air Refueling Squadron
	Air Force Outstanding Unit Award	1 July 1988–30 June 1990	407th Air Refueling Squadron

Campaign Streamer	Campaign	Dates	Notes
	Antisubmarine	7 December 1941 – 18 July 1942	407th Bombardment Squadron
	Air Combat, EAME Theater	18 August 1942 – 11 May 1945	407th Bombardment Squadron
	Air Offensive, Europe	18 August 1942 – 5 June 1944	407th Bombardment Squadron
	Normandy	6 June 1944 – 24 July 1944	407th Bombardment Squadron
	Northern France	25 July 1944 – 14 September 1944	407th Bombardment Squadron
	Rhineland	15 September 1944 – 21 March 1945	407th Bombardment Squadron
	Ardennes-Alsace	16 December 1944 – 25 January 1945	407th Bombardment Squadron
	Central Europe	22 March 1944 – 21 May 1945	407th Bombardment Squadron

== See also ==
- B-17 Flying Fortress units of the United States Army Air Forces
- List of United States Air Force air refueling squadrons
