= Operation Head Start =

Experimental Air Force program

- Date: Mid-September to mid-December 1958
- Duration: Three months
- Venue: Loring Air Force Base
- Location: Limestone, Maine, USA (flights over Greenland and Eastern Canada)
- Type: Military operation, Cold War program
- Theme: Airborne alert, Nuclear deterrence
- Cause: Cold War tensions
- Motive: To test the feasibility of a continuous airborne alert with nuclear-armed bombers
- Perpetrator: United States Air Force (Strategic Air Command)
- Organised by: United States Air Force (Strategic Air Command)
- Participants: USAF bomber crews, support personnel
- Outcome: Demonstrated the feasibility of continuous airborne alert, leading to Operation Chrome Dome
- Experimental program that paved the way for Operation Chrome Dome. Bombers carried live nuclear warheads.

Operation Head Start was an experimental program by the United States Air Force during the Cold War where Strategic Air Command bombers were launched from Loring Air Force Base and loitered off of the coast of western Greenland and eastern Canada. It was operational from mid-September to mid-December 1958. It would eventually lead to Operation Chrome Dome, as it was part of a series of programs which showed that a continuous airborne alert could be achieved.

== Background ==
Operation Head Start was experimented at Loring Air Force Base, from September to December, 1958. Through the actions of the crewmembers, it helped to demonstrate that a continuous airborne alert could be maintained successfully. Before each flight, a briefing would be held, alerting the crewmembers to basic world events as well as safety criteria. At least fifteen hours before takeoff, the crew would thoroughly pre-flight their aircraft. Inadvertently, this also increased efficiency in terms of maintenance and other pre-flight routines. For the next twelve hours, crewmembers would enter a period of uninterrupted rest, and use the next three hours to prepare for takeoff. During this final preparation, they would first be taken to the cafeteria, where they would be fed a meal high in protein. After their final briefing, two crewmembers would be sent to pick up specialized meals for their long flight (the meals would later be prepared in an oven during flight).

Every six hours, a bomber would then take off with live warheads and continue on a pre-determined path over Greenland and eastern Canada, a trip that would end twenty hours later. Frequently, "Foxtrot: No message required," messages would be sent to the bomber from Strategic Air Command headquarters at Offutt Air Force Base, with the idea that one of them could tell them to go to war, helping keep the crews on their feet. During their flight, many of the boom operators would enter admission into the Million Pound Club, which meant that they had transferred a million or more pounds of fuel on ten sorties or less. The added benefit of the training runs, is that it made refuelling more routine. The corresponding group for the bomber crews would be the One Gulp Club, for those who had taken on a hundred thousand pounds of fuel without a disconnect.

While entering the landing pattern, the tower would alert the crash trucks to travel to the runway and await landing. This was a standard procedure for all Head Start landings. After landing, the crew would be interrogated prior to being let go, so that maintenance, intelligence, and other crews could be alerted to the performance of the plane and other things that the crew might have noticed during their long flight. After being let go, they would typically go to the Physical Conditioning room for a steam bath and rub down.

After six sorties, each bomber would receive a major individual inspection, allowing for it to be rotated out of the cycle.

== Phases ==
Head Start was directed to occur in three phases. Phase I would be a practising of the above procedures. Phase II would be a standing down of the wing, with one squadron being dispersed to Bergstrom Air Force Base in Texas. Phase III would include operating the above procedures, but using Bergstrom as a base of operations as well.

== See also ==
- Operation Chrome Dome
- Thule Monitor Mission
- Operation Round Robin
- Operation Giant Lance
