= Caribou Air Force Station =

Airbase in Maine, US

- Near Limestone, Maine in the United States
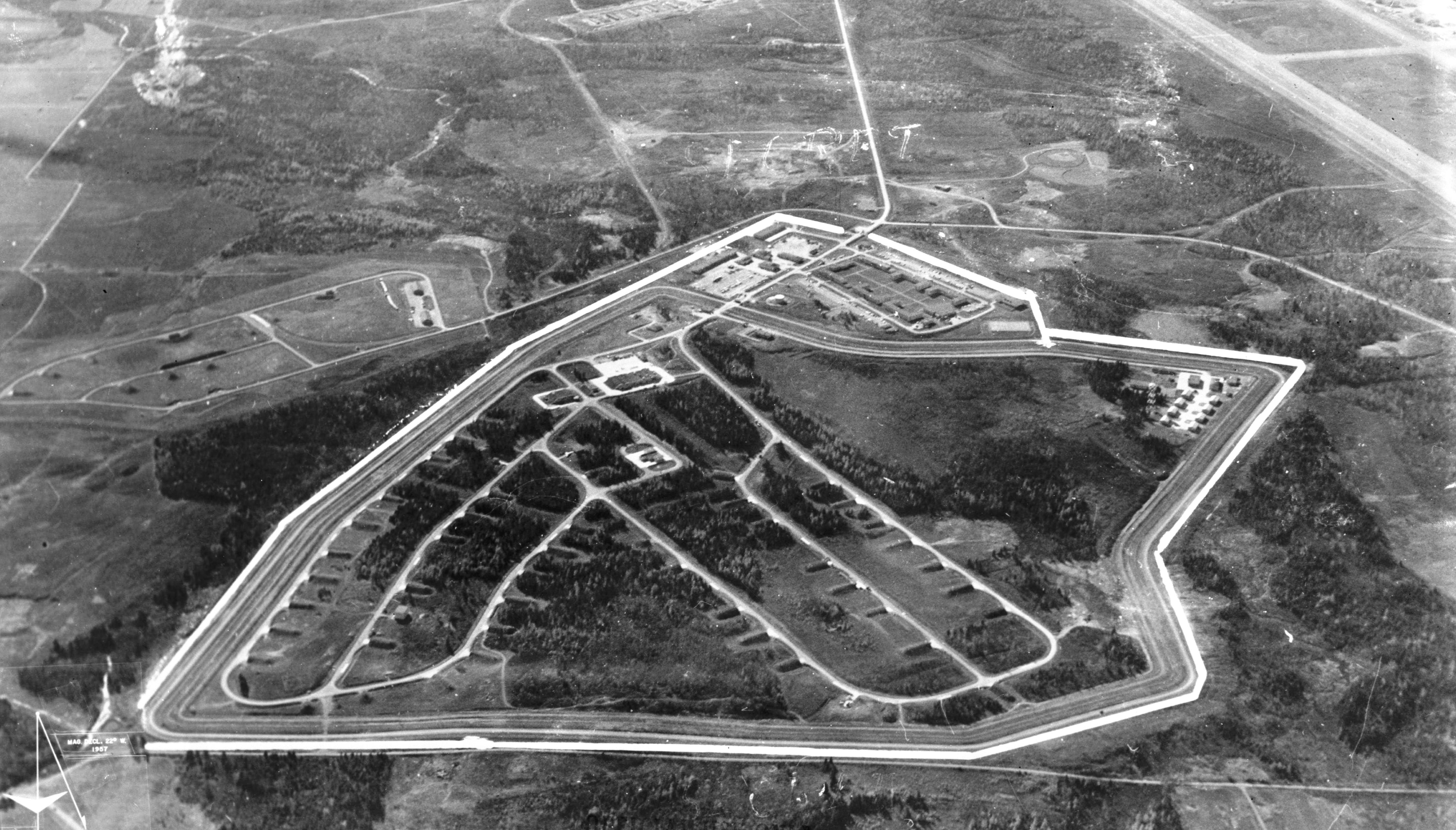
- Caribou Air Force Station in 1967

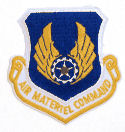

Site information
- Type: US Air Force station
- Owner: Department of Defense
- Operator: US Air Force
- Controlled by: Air Materiel Command
- Condition: Closed
- Function: Nuclear weapons storage

Location
- Location within Maine Location within the United States
- Coordinates: 46°58′9.80″N 67°52′19.77″W

Site history
- Built: 1951
- In use: 1951–1962
- Fate: Became part of Loring Air Force Base

Caribou Air Force Station, also known as North River Depot and East Loring, is a defunct Air Force Station that operated from 1951 until its absorption into Loring Air Force Base in 1962. It was located in Limestone, Maine, adjacent to Loring. Between 1951 and 1962 Caribou was an Operational Storage Site for Air Materiel Command (AMC-OSS), one of five in the United States, and the weapons storage and maintenance facility for Loring alert aircraft.

== Background ==
The Nuclear Weapons Storage Area at Loring once operated as a separate, top secret facility. Originally called the North River Depot, the remote area to the northeast of Loring's property was the first U.S. Operational site allegedly constructed for the storage, assembly, and testing of atomic weapons.

A parallel series of four fences, one of which was electrified, surrounded the heart of the storage area. This was nicknamed the "Q" Area, which denoted the Department of Energy's Q clearance a classified security clearance required to have access to Restricted Data.

In June 1962, the United States Atomic Energy Commission released its custody and ownership of the weapons to the Air Force, and the personnel and property were absorbed into the adjacent Loring Air Force Base.

== Units stationed at Caribou AFS ==
- 3080th Aviation Depot Group
- 3093rd Aviation Depot Squadron
- 3080th Air Police Squadron
