= Maine's 1st State Senate district =

American legislative district

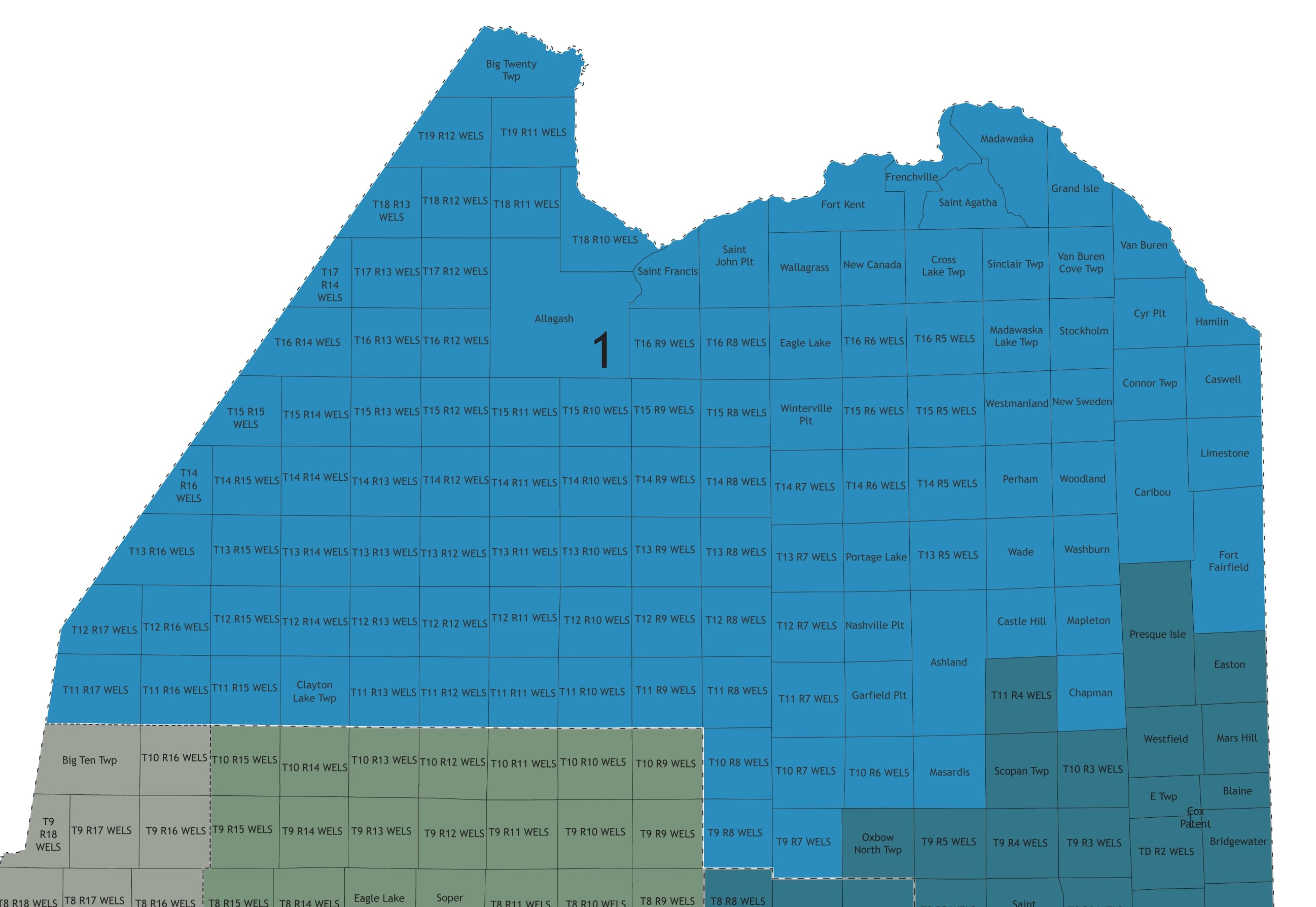
Senator
Susan Bernard; R–Aroostook
- Registration: 35.9% Republican; 18.7% Democratic; 45.4% No party preference
- Population (2020): 36,863

Maine's 1st State Senate district is one of 35 districts in the Maine Senate. It has been represented by Republican Susan Bernard since 2024.

== Geography ==
District 1 covers far northern Maine, including the majority of Aroostook County. It is located entirely within Maine's 2nd congressional district. It borders the Canadian province of Quebec.

Aroostook County - 54.9% of county

City:

- Caribou

Towns:

- Allagash
- Ashland
- Castle Hill
- Caswell
- Chapman
- Eagle Lake
- Fort Fairfield
- Fort Kent
- Frenchville
- Grand Isle
- Hamlin
- Limestone
- Madawaska
- Mapleton
- Masardis
- New Canada
- New Sweden
- Perham
- Portage Lake
- Saint Agatha
- Saint Francis
- Stockholm
- Van Buren
- Wade
- Wallagrass
- Washburn
- Westmanland
- Woodland

== Recent election results ==
=== 2022 ===
2022 Maine State Senate election, District 1
Party	Candidate	Votes	%
Democratic	Troy Dale Jackson	8,817	52.5
Republican	Susan Y. Bernard	7,947	47.5
Total votes		23,967	100
Democratic hold			

Elections prior to 2022 were held under different district lines.

=== 2024 ===
2024 Maine State Senate election, District 1
Party	Candidate	Votes	%
Republican	Susan Y. Bernard	13,284	65.8%
Democratic	Vaughn McLaughlin	6,892	34.2%
Total votes		20,140	100.0
Republican gain from Democratic			

== Historical election results ==
=== 2012 ===
2012 Maine State Senate election, District 1
Party	Candidate	Votes	%
Democratic	Dawn Hill	13,592	62.8
Republican	Arthur Kyricos	8,066	37.2
Total votes		21,658	100
Democratic hold			

=== 2014 ===
2014 Maine State Senate election, District 1
Party	Candidate	Votes	%
Republican	Peter Edgecomb (incumbent)	7,935	50.9
Democratic	Charles Theriault	7,107	45.6
Blank votes	None	548	3.5
Total votes		15,590	100
Republican gain from Democratic			

=== 2016 ===
2016 Maine State Senate election, District 1
Party	Candidate	Votes	%
Democratic	Troy Dale Jackson (incumbent)	9,589	51.5
Republican	Timothy Guerrette	9,018	48.5
Total votes		18,607	100
Democratic gain from Republican			

=== 2018 ===
2018 Maine State Senate election, District 1
Party	Candidate	Votes	%
Democratic	Troy Dale Jackson	8,793	60.7
Republican	Michael Nadeau	5,683	39.3
Total votes		14,476	100
Democratic hold			

=== 2020 ===
2020 Maine State Senate election, District 1
Party	Candidate	Votes	%
Democratic	Troy Dale Jackson	10,937	59.4
Republican	Brian Schaefer	7,485	40.6
Total votes		18,452	100
Democratic hold			
