= Maine State Route 163 =

State highway in Aroostook County, Maine, US

State Route 163

Route information
- Maintained by MaineDOT
- Length: 22.43 mi (36.10 km)

Major junctions
- West end: SR 11 in Ashland
- US 1 in Presque Isle
- East end: SR 167 in Presque Isle

Location
- Country: United States
- State: Maine
- Counties: Aroostook

Highway system
- Maine State Highway System; Interstate; US; State; Auto trails; Lettered highways
← SR 162	→ SR 164

State Route 163 (SR 163) is a 22.4-mile-long (36.0 km) state highway in the northern part of Maine, United States. It runs between Ashland at SR 11 and Presque Isle at SR 167, entirely in Aroostook County.

== Route description ==
SR 163 begins in Ashland's business district at Main Street (SR 11). It heads due east along Presque Isle Road passing some gas stations, markets, Ashland District School, and houses. The road leaves the town center and enters a more rural area with it surrounded mostly by wooded areas. It curves to the northeast and enters the unincorporated Central Aroostook territory. It then curves back to the east where it enters the town of Castle Hill. SR 163 makes another curve to the northeast where it climbs a hill to the south of Haystack Mountain. On this climb, an extra climbing lane is provided for eastbound travelers. At the summit of this hill, the road passes the entrance to a park. After making a few more curves, homes begin to appear along the road again. After completing one more set of curves to the north, SR 163 enters the town of Mapleton and its town center. At first, the road (carrying the name Main Street) passes mostly houses, but also a church and the post office. After passing under a Maine Northern Railway railroad (formerly Bangor and Aroostook Railroad), the road enters the town's business center passing some eateries, markets, and a gas station. The business district gives way to a more residential setting passing a school along the way. Rolling hills are also found along SR 163 east of downtown Mapleton. The road crosses the aforementioned railroad at-grade and curves to the south to head around the south side of Northern Maine Regional Airport at Presque Isle.

While curving to the south to bypass the airport, SR 163 enters the city of Presque Isle. While curving back to the north, the street name of the road here is Industrial Street and passes in front of various stores, specialty businesses, and light industrial companies. It joins Mechanic Street heading east for three blocks before reaching a five-leg signalized intersection with State Street, Dyer Street, and Parson Street. SR 163 heads due north along Parson Street where SR 227 begins at the previous intersection forming a wrong-way concurrency (as SR 163 travels east, SR 227 travels west). The routes pass a mix of businesses, service corporations, and houses. The road briefly curves to the west and intersects State Road; SR 227 breaks off the concurrency here and heads northwest. SR 163 continues east on Parsons Road Connector around the north side of downtown Presque Isle. After passing over Presque Isle Stream, it reaches an intersection with US 1. Continuing east, it passes to the south of Aroostook Centre Mall and various other stores while it briefly expands to four lanes. It necks down to two lanes as it crosses over a railroad and ends at Fort Fairfield Road, SR 167.

== History ==
SR 163 formerly followed a different routing through Presque Isle and continued further east into Fort Fairfield. From the five-point intersection in Presque Isle, it traveled east along State Street to US 1. After traveling north along US 1 / Main Street, it turned east along North Street forming a concurrency with SR 167. The two routes traveled along the southern banks of the Aroostook River and intersected the southern terminus of SR 205 before SR 163 split from the road and traveled east along Maple Grove Road. It entered Fort Fairfield and ended at US 1A.

== Major junctions ==
The entire route is in Aroostook County.

Location	mi	km	Destinations	Notes
Ashland	0.00	0.00	SR 11 (Main Street) – Patten, Eagle Lake, Fort Kent	
Presque Isle	19.98	32.15	SR 227 begins / State Street / Dyer Street	Western end of SR 227 concurrency
Presque Isle	20.86– 20.96	33.57– 33.73	SR 227 west (State Road) – Ashland	Eastern end of SR 227 concurrency
Presque Isle	21.63	34.81	US 1 (Main Street) – Caribou, Mars Hill	
Presque Isle	22.43	36.10	SR 167 (Fort Fairfield Road) – Fort Fairfield	
1.000 mi = 1.609 km; 1.000 km = 0.621 mi: Concurrency terminus
