= Ashland Community High School =

Location
- 46 Hayward Street; Ashland, Aroostook, Maine 04732; United States
- Coordinates: 46°37′46″N 68°23′41″W

Information
- Type: High/Middle School
- Superintendent: Joel Hall
- School number: MSAD 32
- Principal: Joel Hall
- Faculty: 20
- Colors: Orange, black, and white
- Team name: Hornets
- Communities served: Ashland, Garfield Plantation, Masardis, Oxbow Plantation, and Portage Lake
- Website: https://www.sad32.org/

Ashland Community High School was located in Ashland, Maine, United States. It was part of Maine School Administrative District 32, or MSAD 32, which serves Ashland, Garfield Plantation, Masardis, Oxbow, Portage Lake and Sheridan, Maine. There was a student population of 200 in school grades 7–12, with eighteen faculty members as well as administrators, a counselor and three support personnel. The school had achieved accredited status with the New England Association of Schools and Colleges.

Sports programs offered at Ashland Community High School included baseball, basketball, cheering, cross country, golf, softball and soccer. The school's teams are known as the Hornets.

In fall 2010, Ashland Community High School was demolished to make way for new athletic fields for the completed Ashland District School which houses grades K-12. Construction began on the Ashland District School in 2008.
