= Maine State Route 227 =

State highway in Aroostook County, Maine, US

State Route 227

Route information
- Maintained by MaineDOT
- Length: 24.38 mi (39.24 km)

Major junctions
- West end: SR 11 in Ashland
- East end: SR 163 in Presque Isle

Location
- Country: United States
- State: Maine
- Counties: Aroostook

Highway system
- Maine State Highway System; Interstate; US; State; Auto trails; Lettered highways
| ← SR 226 | → SR 228 |

State Route 227 (SR 227) is a 24.38-mile-long (39.24 km) state highway located in Aroostook County in northeastern Maine. Its western terminus is at SR 11 in Ashland and its eastern terminus is at SR 163 in Presque Isle after sharing a one-mile-long (1.6 km) concurrency.

SR 227 roughly parallels SR 163 over its entire length. However, SR 163 takes a more direct route between Ashland and Presque Isle while SR 227 takes a more arc-like shape to the north, generally paralleling the Aroostook River.

== Route description ==
SR 227 begins at the intersection of Main Street, Station Street, and Sheridan Road in Ashland. Main Street to the south and Station Street to the west carry SR 11. With SR 227 heading east along Exchange Street, it first passes a diner and a bar, then a church, but it heads past mostly houses. Exiting the center of the town, the road heads up a small hill, passes an electrical substation, then heads through rolling hills and curves to the northeast traveling on Frenchville Road. Though most of the area consists of woods and houses, some farms line the road through the remainder of Ashland. Nearing the town line, SR 227 passes through Frenchville, consisting of more densely-spaced houses and a church and its cemetery. When the road crosses into the town of Castle Hill, it begins to head in a more easterly direction. The road make a long descent into a valley crossing Welts Brook at the bottom. It then climbs Castle Hill and reaches the settlement of the same name at the top. A church is visible along the road but the settlement is mostly made up of houses that line the road.

Before exiting Castle Hill, the road descends from the ridge passing a cemetery and additional houses. It exits Castle Hill and then enters Mapleton. At the settlement of State Road, SR 227 crosses a rail trail (formerly Bangor and Aroostook Railroad) and bends to the northeast after a stretch of traveling east. It then curves to the southeast and passes several large farms and churches. Houses continue to line the road as well. Continuing southeast, it enters the city of Presque Isle and passes to the north of Northern Maine Regional Airport at Presque Isle. The road turns further to the southeast and enters an industrialized area of the city. After passing Skyway Street, an access road to the industrial companies around the airport, SR 227 intersects with SR 163, the Parsons Road Connector.

SR 227 east is cosigned with SR 163 west along Parsons Street towards downtown Presque Isle. The opposing directions of the routes result in a wrong-way concurrency. The SR 227 designation ends at the intersection of Parsons Street, State Street, and Industrial Drive. Eastbound State Street (which formerly carried SR 163 east before it was rerouted around downtown) connects to U.S. Route 1 (US 1) downtown, while SR 163 west turns onto Mechanic Street towards Mapleton.

== History ==
SR 227 has maintained its original alignment since its designation in 1939. Originally, it ran alone on Parsons Street and terminated at SR 163 as it does today. At that time, SR 163 ran west-to-east along Industrial Drive and onto State Street to connect with US 1, with which it was cosigned in downtown Presque Isle.

In 1994, the Parsons Road Connector was built connecting SR 227 to US 1 at Maysville Street north of downtown. SR 163 was removed from State Street and rerouted up Parsons Street, onto the connector, and onto Maysville Street to divert traffic from the west away from downtown. The eastern terminus of SR 227 was not moved, however, resulting in a wrong-way concurrency between SR 163 and SR 227, the latter of which now terminates at unnumbered State Street.

== Major junctions ==
The entire route is in Aroostook County.

| Location | mi | km | Destinations | Notes |
|---|---|---|---|---|
| Ashland | 0.00 | 0.00 | SR 11 (Main Street / Station Street) / Sheridan Road – Patten, Fort Kent | Western terminus of SR 227 |
| Presque Isle | 23.40 | 37.66 | SR 163 east (Parsons Road Connector) to US 1 – Fort Fairfield | Western terminus of SR 163 concurrency |
| Presque Isle | 24.38 | 39.24 | SR 163 west (Mechanic Street) / State Street / Dyer Street – Business District, Mapleton | Eastern terminus of SR 227 |
1.000 mi = 1.609 km; 1.000 km = 0.621 mi: Concurrency terminus
