= Birch River (Maine) =

Location
- Country: United States

Physical characteristics
- Source
  - location: Maine
- Mouth
  - location: St. Froid Lake (Fish River)
  - elevation: 581 feet (177 m)
- Length: about 5 miles (8 km)

The Birch River is a 5.1-mile-long (8.2 km) river in Aroostook County, Maine, in the United States. From the confluence of its North Branch and South Branch (47°01′57″N 68°40′44″W) in the southwest corner of the town of Eagle Lake, the river runs southeast to St. Froid Lake in Winterville Plantation. The lake is drained by the Fish River, a tributary of the Saint John River.

== See also ==
- List of rivers of Maine
