= Mars Hill-Blaine, Maine =

- Former CDP
- Location within the state of Maine
- Coordinates: 46°30′45″N 67°52′00″W
- Country: United States
- State: Maine
- County: Aroostook
- Towns: Mars Hill, Blaine

Area
  - Total: 4.9 sq mi (12.6 km^{2})
  - Land: 4.8 sq mi (12.5 km^{2})
  - Water: 0.039 sq mi (0.1 km^{2})

Population (2000)
  - Total: 1,428
  - Density: 295/sq mi (113.9/km^{2})
- Time zone: UTC-5 (Eastern (EST))
  - Summer (DST): UTC-4 (EDT)
- Area code: 207
- FIPS code: 23-43745

Mars Hill-Blaine was a census-designated place (CDP) occupying parts of the towns of Mars Hill and Blaine in Aroostook County, Maine, United States. The population was 1,428 at the 2000 census. For the 2010 census the area was redelineated as two separate CDPs, Mars Hill and Blaine.

== Geography ==
Mars Hill-Blaine is located at 46°30′45″N 67°52′00″W (46.512409, -67.866553).

According to the United States Census Bureau, the CDP had a total area of 4.9 square miles (13 km^{2}), of which 4.8 square miles (12 km^{2}) was land and 0.04 square miles (0.10 km^{2}), or 0.62%, was water.

== Demographics ==
As of the census of 2000, there were 1,428 people, 602 households, and 399 families residing in the CDP. The population density was 294.9 inhabitants per square mile (113.9/km^{2}). There were 684 housing units at an average density of 141.3 per square mile (54.6/km^{2}). The racial makeup of the CDP was 97.13% White, 0.07% African American, 1.75% Native American, 0.07% Asian, 0.07% from other races, and 0.91% from two or more races. Hispanic or Latino of any race were 0.56% of the population.

There were 602 households, out of which 25.6% had children under the age of 18 living with them, 54.0% were married couples living together, 7.8% had a female householder with no husband present, and 33.7% were non-families. 30.6% of all households were made up of individuals, and 18.9% had someone living alone who was 65 years of age or older. The average household size was 2.31 and the average family size was 2.83.

In the CDP, the population was spread out, with 22.4% under the age of 18, 7.5% from 18 to 24, 25.9% from 25 to 44, 20.0% from 45 to 64, and 24.2% who were 65 years of age or older. The median age was 40 years. For every 100 females, there were 85.5 males. For every 100 females age 18 and over, there were 81.3 males.

The median income for a household in the CDP was $23,933, and the median income for a family was $34,934. Males had a median income of $26,413 versus $21,776 for females. The per capita income for the CDP was $14,264. About 13.2% of families and 17.1% of the population were below the poverty line, including 19.4% of those under age 18 and 21.0% of those age 65 or over.
