= North Branch Birch River =

Location
- Country: United States

Physical characteristics
- Source
  - location: Maine
- Mouth
  - location: Birch River
  - elevation: 670 feet (200 m)
- Length: about 9 miles (14 km)

The North Branch Birch River is a 9.6-mile-long (15.4 km) river in Aroostook County, Maine, in the United States. From the outlet of a small pond (47°04′31″N 68°47′52″W) in Maine Township 16, Range 8, WELS, it runs about 6 miles (10 km) east and about 3 miles (5 km) south to its confluence with the South Branch in the town of Eagle Lake to form the Birch River. It is part of the Fish River watershed, draining north to the Saint John River and ultimately southeast to the Bay of Fundy in New Brunswick, Canada.

== See also ==
- List of rivers of Maine
