= Daigle =

Daigle or D'Aigle is a surname of French origin. It is a variation of French surnames Daigre, meaning "from Aigre" or Deigne which was said to have derived from a Germanic name. Daigle may refer to:

== People ==
- Alain Daigle (born 1954), Canadian-born US ice hockey player
- Alexandre Daigle (born 1975), Canadian ice hockey player
- Angela Daigle (born 1976), US track and field athlete
- Anthony Daigle (born 1970), American football player
- Armand Daigle (1892–1957), Canadian politician
- Casey Daigle (born 1981), US baseball player
- Christian Daigle (1978–2021), Canadian ice hockey player and player agent
- France Daigle (born 1953), Canadian author
- Fred Daigle (born 1930), Canadian boxer
- Jeff Daigle, American diplomat
- Jennie Daigle (born 1980), US softball player, also known as Jennie Finch
- Joseph Daigle (New Brunswick politician) (born 1934), Canadian lawyer, politician, Justice
- Joseph Daigle (Quebec politician) (1831–1908), Canadian merchant, civil servant, politician
- Jules O. Daigle (1900–1998), Roman Catholic priest, author of first dictionary devoted to Cajun French language
- Lauren Daigle (born 1991) American singer
- Matt Daigle (born 1972), US graphic artist noted for providing International breastfeeding symbol
- Reuben D'Aigle (1874–1959), Canadian prospector in the Klondike, Ontario, Quebec and Labrador
- Sylvie Daigle (born 1962), Canadian speed skater

== Places ==
- Aigle, district in Switzerland
- Daigle, Maine, small town in Maine
- L'Aigle a town in the Orne department in Normandy in northwestern France.
- Le Bec d'Aigle, a massive rock which shelters Parc du Mugel in France ("Eagle's Beak")
- Colline d'Aigle, the second highest prominence in Louisiana ("Eagle Hill")
- Nid d'Aigle, a terminus of the Mont Blanc Tramway in France ("Eagle's Nest")

== Other ==
- Tremblay v. Daigle, a decision of the Supreme Court of Canada that a fetus has no legal status in Canada as a person
