= Maine School Administrative District 27 =

School district in Maine, United States

Address
- 84 Pleasant Street Fort Kent, Maine, 04743; United States
- Coordinates: 47°10′N 68°40′W

District information
- Type: Public
- Grades: PreK–12
- Superintendent: Benjamin Sirois
- NCES District ID: 2311100

Students and staff
- Students: 840 (2020–2021)
- Teachers: 68.95 (on an FTE basis)
- Staff: 86.8 (on an FTE basis)
- Student–teacher ratio: 12.18:1

Other information
- Website: www.sad27.org

Maine School Administrative District 27 is the northernmost school district in the U.S. state of Maine. The district is based in Fort Kent and covers the towns of Allagash, Eagle Lake, Fort Kent, New Canada, Saint Francis, and Wallagrass. It includes the territory of the former M.S.A.D. 10, which encompassed the town of Allagash, Maine until the mid-1990s. SAD 27 rejected a proposed unified school project that would involve building a new high school in a location it disagreed with.

== Schools ==
- Fort Kent Community High School (9-12)
- Valley Rivers Middle School (7-8)
- Fort Kent Elementary School (PK-6)
