= South Branch Birch River =

Location
- Country: United States

Physical characteristics
- Source
  - location: Maine
- Mouth
  - location: Birch River
  - elevation: 670 feet (200 m)
- Length: about 9 miles (14 km)

The South Branch Birch River is a 9.4-mile-long (15.1 km) river in Aroostook County, Maine, in the United States. From the outlet of a small pond (47°03′33″N 68°50′10″W) in Maine Township 16, Range 9, WELS, it runs southeast and east to its confluence with the North Branch in the town of Eagle Lake to form the Birch River. It is part of the Fish River watershed, draining north to the Saint John River, which flows southeast to the Bay of Fundy in New Brunswick, Canada.

== See also ==
- List of rivers of Maine
