= Ashland District School =

Location
- 180 Presque Isle Rd. Ashland, Aroostook, Maine 04732; United States; 46°37′40″N 68°23′39″W

Information
- Type: Pre-K, Kindergarten, Elementary, Middle, and High School
- Opened: September 8, 2010
- Superintendent: Gehrig T. Johnson
- School number: MSAD 32
- Principal: Joel Hall
- Faculty: 56
- Grades: Pre-K-12
- Hours in school day: 6 hr 40 min
- Classrooms: 30
- Campus size: 87,000 sq ft (8,100 m^{2})
- Colors: Orange, black, and white
- Athletics conference: Class D
- Sports: Golf, soccer, basketball, cross country skiing, and baseball/softball
- Mascot: Hornet
- Team name: Hornets
- Accreditation: New England Association of Schools and Colleges
- Communities served: Ashland, Garfield Plantation, Masardis, Oxbow Plantation, and Portage Lake
- Website: www.sad32.org

Ashland District School is located in Ashland, Maine, United States. It is part of Maine School Administrative District 32, or MSAD 32, which serves Ashland, Garfield Plantation, Masardis, Oxbow, Portage Lake, and Sheridan, Maine. There is a student population of approximately 320 from school grades Pre-K–12, with fifty-six faculty members as well as administrators, a counselor and three support personnel. The school had achieved accredited status with the New England Association of Schools and Colleges.

Sports programs offered at Ashland District School include: baseball, basketball, cheering, cross country, golf, softball, and soccer. The school's teams are known as the Ashland Hornets.

== History ==
Ashland District School was designed by Lewis & Malm Architecture of Bucksport, Maine, residing where the old soccer and baseball/softball fields used to be. Construction began on August 19, 2008, and completed just in time for the 2010–2011 school year. A public open house was held on September 1, 2010, and week later opened to students for the first day of school on September 8, 2010. The new lighted soccer and baseball/softball fields are adjacent to the school where the Ashland Community High School used to be.

== Catchment ==
The Maine Department of Education takes responsibility for coordinating school assignments in the unorganized territory. The state assigns Oxbow to Ashland District School. When Oxbow was a plantation, it was directly under the School Administrative District 32.
