= Ashland School District =

There are several school districts in the United States called Ashland School District, including:

- Ashland Independent School District — Ashland, Kentucky
- Ashland District School — Ashland, Maine
- Ashland City School District — Ashland, Ohio
- Ashland School District (Oregon) — Ashland, Oregon
- Ashland School District (Wisconsin) — Ashland, Wisconsin
