= Susan Bernard (politician) =

American politician

Member of the Maine Senate from the 1st district
- Incumbent
- Assumed office December 3, 2024
- Preceded by: Troy Jackson

Personal details
- Party: Republican

Susan Y. Bernard is an American politician from Maine. Bernard, a Republican, was elected to the Maine Senate in 2024 (District 1). She is a resident of Aroostook and previously in the state house. In the Legislature, Bernard represents a largely rural district covering the northernmost part of the state, made up of the majority of the County of Aroostook, a county known for its potato cultivation.

Prior to serving in electoral politics, Bernard worked as a television news director for 20 years for WAGM-TV 8 and a dean in Northern Maine Community College.
