= Bernard Ayotte =

American politician from Maine

Bernard L. A. Ayotte

Member of the Maine House of Representatives from the 3rd district
- In office 2006–2014

Personal details
- Party: Republican
- Education: St. Francis University
- Profession: Educator

Bernard Ayotte (November 25, 1943 - October 13, 2024) was an American politician from Maine. Ayotte represented District 3 in the Maine House of Representatives, which was part of Aroostook County. Ayotte is a resident of the town of Caswell. He is a Republican and was first elected in 2006. He was re-elected in 2008, 2010 and 2012. He was unable to run for re-election 2014 due to term-limits.

Ayotte graduated from St. Francis University in Biddeford, Maine (now the University of New England) with a degree in biology. He is a veteran of the United States Army and was a teacher and principal in New Sweden, Maine.

In 2009, Ayotte was named to the National Environmental Leadership Group at the National Conference of State Legislatures.

Ayotte died in October 2024.
