= Aroostook National Wildlife Refuge =

Protected area in Maine, United States

- IUCN category IV (habitat/species management area)
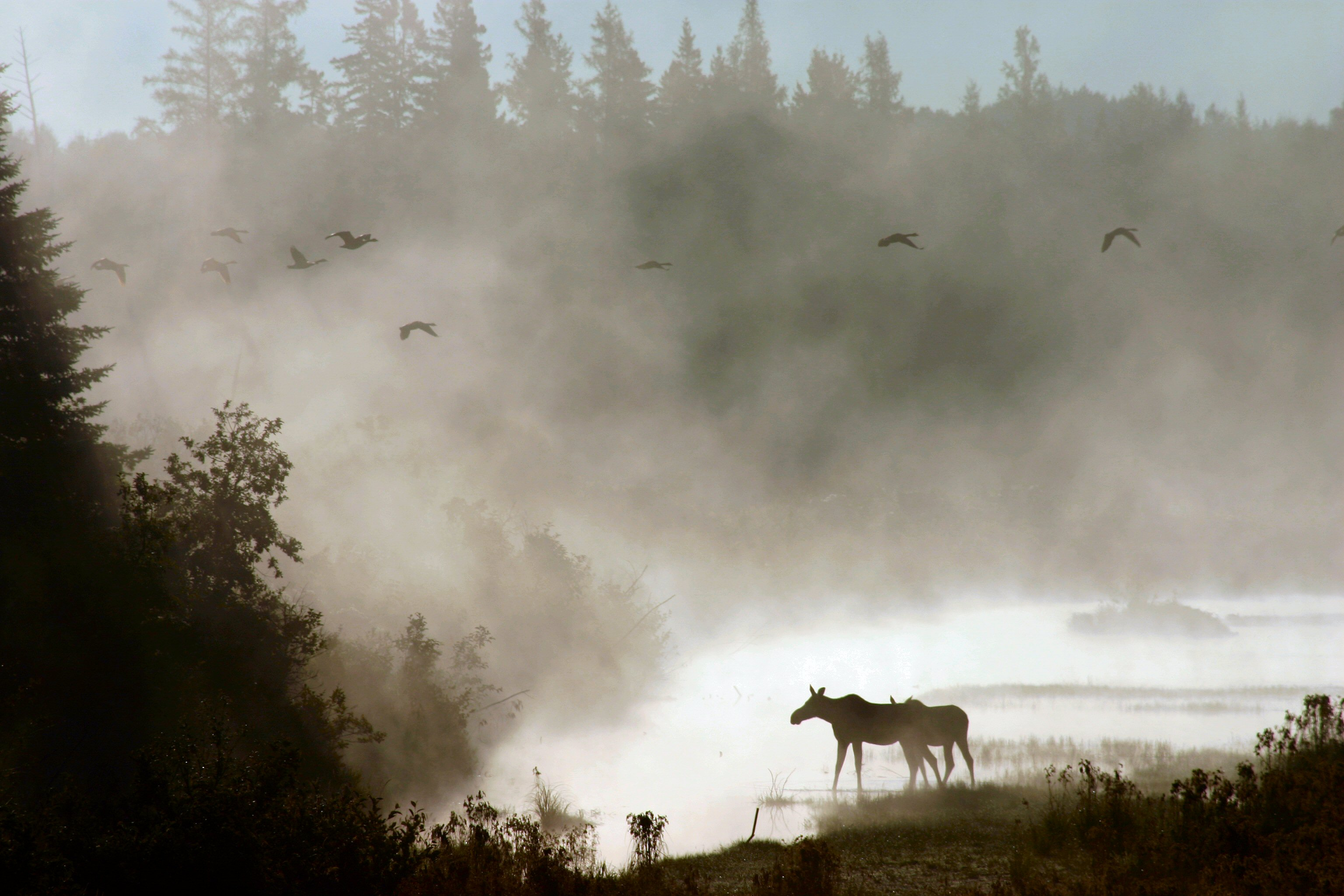
- Moose at Aroostook National Wildlife Refuge, August 2005

- Location within Maine Location within the United States
- Location: Aroostook County, Maine, United States
- Nearest city: Limestone
- Coordinates: 46.95°N 67.87°W
- Area: 5,252 acres (21.25 km^{2})
- Established: 1998
- Governing body: U.S. Fish and Wildlife Service
- Website: Aroostook National Wildlife Refuge

Aroostook National Wildlife Refuge is located on part of the former Loring Air Force Base, in Aroostook County, Maine. It was established in 1998, when 4,700 acres (19 km^{2}) were transferred from the United States Air Force to the United States Fish and Wildlife Service. This refuge also administers some 2,400 acres (970 ha) of wetland conservation easements throughout Aroostook County. It is close to the Aroostook State Park where visitors can camp, hike, fish, and cross-country ski. In a portion of Maine where the landscape is dominated by agricultural crops such as potatoes and broccoli, Aroostook National Wildlife Refuge protects valuable wildlife habitat. The variety of habitat types attracts a diversity of wildlife species.

The refuge has a surface area of 5,252 acres (21.25 km^{2}). It occurs in the towns of Limestone, Caswell, Connor, and Caribou.

== Wildlife ==
Numerous mammalian species inhabit the refuge, including:

- American black bear
- American mink
- Beaver
- Bobcat
- Canada lynx
- Coyote
- Fisher
- Groundhog
- Moose
- Muskrat
- Porcupine
- North American river otter
- Northern short-tailed shrew
- Raccoon
- Red fox
- Red squirrel
- Short-tailed weasel
- Snowshoe hare
- White-tailed deer

Waterfowl that use the refuge's wetlands include the American black duck, wood duck, green-winged teal and hooded merganser, among others; Canada geese may be seen on East Loring Lake and the Little Madawaska River, upstream from the dam during spring and fall migration. Common loons may be heard and observed on the refuge's larger bodies of water, and bald eagles are also commonly seen.

The majority of the refuge is forested upland, which offers ideal nesting habitat for migratory songbirds. Warblers, such as the black-throated green, Canada, bay-breasted, Cape May, and Blackburnian warbler are common in the spring and summer. These "neotropical migrants" breed in Maine and winter further south in México, various Caribbean islands, as well as on mainland Central and South America. The refuge's meadows and grassland habitats provide security for the upland sandpiper, bobolink and savannah sparrow. The American woodcock uses these grassy areas for courtship, and upland forested areas for nesting.

Reptile and amphibians in the refuge include the:

- American bullfrog
- American toad
- Blue-spotted salamander
- Common garter snake
- Common snapping turtle
- Eastern newt
- Eastern red-backed salamander
- Gray treefrog
- Green frog
- Mink frog
- Mole salamander
- Northern dusky salamander
- Northern leopard frog
- Northern two-lined salamander
- Painted turtle
- Pickerel frog
- Red-bellied snake
- Spotted salamander
- Spring peeper
- Wood frog
- Wood turtle

Many other species of birds inhabit the refuge, both seasonally and resident, as do numerous amphibians, reptiles, fish, insects, and other invertebrates.

The refuge contains numerous Cold War era concrete bunkers that reportedly housed early nuclear weapons prior to the closure of the Air Force Base. Now the vegetated tops of those bunkers serve as habitat for a variety of wildlife species.

Visitors are welcome to use the refuge for recreational activities, such as hiking, bicycling, wildlife photography, cross-country skiing, and snowshoeing. The refuge contains several roads and hiking trails, some of which are groomed in the winter for cross-country skiing and snowshoeing. The refuge has a visitor center and store near the main entrance to the refuge.
