= Fairmount Cemetery =

Fairmount Cemetery may refer to several cemeteries in the United States:

- Fairmount Cemetery (Denver, Colorado)
- Fairmount Cemetery (Presque Isle, Maine)
- Fairmount Cemetery (Newark, New Jersey)
