= Eagle Hill =

Mount Vision may refer to:

- Eagle Hill (Louisiana), a summit in Sabine Parish, Louisiana
- Eagle Hill (New York), a summit in Otsego County, New York
- Eagle Hill (Budapest), a hill in Hungary
