= Mapleton (CDP), Maine =

Mapleton, Maine
- Census-designated place
- Location of Mapleton, Maine
- Coordinates: 46°40′51″N 68°09′04″W
- Country: United States
- State: Maine
- County: Aroostook
- Town: Mapleton

Area
  - Total: 3.00 sq mi (7.78 km^{2})
  - Land: 3.00 sq mi (7.78 km^{2})
  - Water: 0 sq mi (0.00 km^{2})
- Elevation: 568 ft (173 m)

Population (2020)
  - Total: 623
  - Density: 207/sq mi (80.1/km^{2})
- Time zone: UTC-5 (Eastern (EST))
  - Summer (DST): UTC-4 (EDT)
- ZIP code: 04757
- Area code: 207
- FIPS code: 23-43220
- GNIS feature ID: 2583561

Mapleton is a census-designated place (CDP) comprising the main village within the town of Mapleton in Aroostook County, Maine, United States. The population of the CDP was 683 at the 2010 census, out of a population of 1,948 for the entire town.

== Geography ==
The Mapleton CDP is located in the southwestern part of the town of Mapleton, along Maine State Route 163. It is 5 miles (8 km) east to Presque Isle and 14 miles (23 km) west to Ashland.

According to the United States Census Bureau, the CDP has a total area of 3.0 square miles (7.8 km^{2}), all land.

== Demographics ==
Historical population
Census	Pop.	Note	%±
2020	623		—
U.S. Decennial Census

== Education ==
The school district for this community is School Administrative District 01.
