= Mars Hill (CDP), Maine =

Mars Hill, Maine
- Census-designated place
- Location of Mars Hill, Maine
- Coordinates: 46°31′22″N 67°52′36″W
- Country: United States
- State: Maine
- County: Aroostook
- Town: Mars Hill

Area
  - Total: 2.16 sq mi (5.60 km^{2})
  - Land: 2.13 sq mi (5.51 km^{2})
  - Water: 0.031 sq mi (0.08 km^{2})
- Elevation: 423 ft (129 m)

Population (2020)
  - Total: 818
  - Density: 384.3/sq mi (148.36/km^{2})
- Time zone: UTC-5 (Eastern (EST))
  - Summer (DST): UTC-4 (EDT)
- ZIP code: 04758
- Area code: 207
- FIPS code: 23-43675
- GNIS feature ID: 2583562

Mars Hill is a census-designated place (CDP) comprising the main village within the town of Mars Hill in Aroostook County, Maine, United States. The population of the CDP was 980 at the 2010 census, out of a population of 1,493 for the entire town. Prior to 2010, the village was part of the Mars Hill-Blaine CDP.

== Geography ==
The Mars Hill CDP is located near the southwestern corner of the town of Mars Hill, bordered by the town and CDP of Blaine to the south. U.S. Route 1 runs through the center of the CDP, leading northwest 14 miles (23 km) to Presque Isle and south 27 miles (43 km) to Houlton. U.S. Route 1A meets Route 1 at the center of the CDP and leads north 19 miles (31 km) to Fort Fairfield, eventually rejoining Route 1 in Van Buren.

According to the United States Census Bureau, the Mars Hill CDP has a total area of 2.2 square miles (5.6 km^{2}), of which 2.1 square miles (5.5 km^{2}) is land and 0.039 square miles (0.1 km^{2}), or 1.48%, is water.

== Demographics ==
Historical population
Census	Pop.	Note	%±
2020	818		—
U.S. Decennial Census
