= Portage, Maine =

- Village
- Location within Maine
- Coordinates: 46°45′47″N 68°28′33″W
- Country: United States
- State: Maine
- County: Aroostook
- Elevation: 650 ft (200 m)
- Time zone: UTC-5 (Eastern (EST))
  - Summer (DST): UTC-4 (EDT)
- ZIP code: 04768
- Area code: 207
- GNIS feature ID: 573678

Portage is an unincorporated village within the town of Portage Lake in Aroostook County, Maine, United States. The community is located on Maine State Route 11 and the southeastern shore of Portage Lake, 10 miles (16 km) north-northwest of Ashland. Portage has a post office, with ZIP code 04768, which opened on November 6, 1883.
