= Clayton Lake, Maine =

- Village
- Location within Maine
- Coordinates: 46°36′39″N 69°31′20″W
- Country: United States
- State: Maine
- County: Aroostook
- Elevation: 1,056 ft (322 m)
- Time zone: UTC-5 (Eastern (EST))
  - Summer (DST): UTC-4 (EDT)
- ZIP code: 04737
- Area code: 207
- GNIS feature ID: 579199

Clayton Lake is an unincorporated village in Aroostook County, Maine, United States. The community is located within the Northwest Aroostook unorganized territory, specifically T11 R14, on the north shore of its eponymous lake within the North Maine Woods in southwestern Aroostook County.

Clayton Lake has been a logging camp since the 1920s. It is periodically used as a base of operations as needs arise such as fighting forest fires.

The village had a post office until 2008 when the community post office was discontinued. The post office had the distinction of being the only post office in the country where mail going to another point in Maine had to pass through two other states as well as Canada. Mail for Clayton Lake was serviced by the post office in Portland, who sent the mail via truck to Boston, then by plane to Montreal and then by train to Lac de la Frontiere, Quebec, before being delivered to Clayton Lake.

== Clayton Lake ==
Clayton Lake is a lake located immediately south of Clayton Lake Village. The lake is 268 acres (108 ha) and has a maximum depth of 17 feet (5.2 m). The lake contains several species of fish, including landlocked salmon, brook trout and rainbow smelt.

== Transportation ==
Clayton Lake is only accessible via private roads within the North Maine Woods. There is a private turf landing strip located north of Clayton Lake.

== Climate ==
Like the rest of Maine, the climate is warm-summer humid continental (Köppen: Dfb) bordering on a subarctic climate (Dfc), with cold and very snowy winters, and pleasant summers on a few occasions being hot.

Climate data for Clayton Lake, Maine, 1991–2020 normals, extremes 1961–2011
Month	Jan	Feb	Mar	Apr	May	Jun	Jul	Aug	Sep	Oct	Nov	Dec	Year
Record high °F (°C)	53 (12)	59 (15)	71 (22)	81 (27)	90 (32)	92 (33)	93 (34)	91 (33)	93 (34)	83 (28)	66 (19)	58 (14)	93 (34)
Mean maximum °F (°C)	42.4 (5.8)	44.0 (6.7)	54.2 (12.3)	68.0 (20.0)	79.9 (26.6)	86.0 (30.0)	87.5 (30.8)	85.5 (29.7)	80.0 (26.7)	70.4 (21.3)	58.6 (14.8)	44.7 (7.1)	89.0 (31.7)
Mean daily maximum °F (°C)	19.6 (−6.9)	23.5 (−4.7)	33.8 (1.0)	46.3 (7.9)	61.2 (16.2)	71.3 (21.8)	75.7 (24.3)	74.1 (23.4)	66.0 (18.9)	51.4 (10.8)	38.4 (3.6)	26.2 (−3.2)	49.0 (9.4)
Daily mean °F (°C)	8.1 (−13.3)	9.9 (−12.3)	20.5 (−6.4)	35.4 (1.9)	49.1 (9.5)	59.0 (15.0)	64.1 (17.8)	62.0 (16.7)	53.5 (11.9)	41.4 (5.2)	30.0 (−1.1)	16.6 (−8.6)	37.5 (3.0)
Mean daily minimum °F (°C)	−3.5 (−19.7)	−3.7 (−19.8)	7.2 (−13.8)	24.5 (−4.2)	36.9 (2.7)	46.6 (8.1)	52.4 (11.3)	49.8 (9.9)	41.0 (5.0)	31.5 (−0.3)	21.7 (−5.7)	7.1 (−13.8)	26.0 (−3.4)
Mean minimum °F (°C)	−29.0 (−33.9)	−25.6 (−32.0)	−20.1 (−28.9)	9.0 (−12.8)	23.7 (−4.6)	31.4 (−0.3)	39.3 (4.1)	33.5 (0.8)	27.4 (−2.6)	17.5 (−8.1)	0.8 (−17.3)	−18.8 (−28.2)	−31.4 (−35.2)
Record low °F (°C)	−42 (−41)	−43 (−42)	−35 (−37)	−14 (−26)	10 (−12)	26 (−3)	30 (−1)	28 (−2)	17 (−8)	5 (−15)	−16 (−27)	−36 (−38)	−43 (−42)
Average precipitation inches (mm)	2.68 (68)	2.27 (58)	2.66 (68)	3.19 (81)	3.63 (92)	4.17 (106)	4.81 (122)	3.45 (88)	3.22 (82)	4.07 (103)	2.53 (64)	3.19 (81)	39.87 (1,013)
Average snowfall inches (cm)	20.1 (51)	15.7 (40)	13.3 (34)	5.5 (14)	0.4 (1.0)	0.0 (0.0)	0.0 (0.0)	0.0 (0.0)	0.0 (0.0)	2.9 (7.4)	10.3 (26)	16.4 (42)	84.6 (215.4)
Average extreme snow depth inches (cm)	22.3 (57)	26.2 (67)	25.3 (64)	9.4 (24)	0.0 (0.0)	0.0 (0.0)	0.0 (0.0)	0.0 (0.0)	0.0 (0.0)	1.4 (3.6)	6.5 (17)	13.2 (34)	32.1 (82)
Average precipitation days (≥ 0.01 in)	10.2	8.9	9.2	9.6	11.0	11.9	14.0	9.4	9.9	11.6	11.3	11.3	128.3
Average snowy days (≥ 0.1 in)	6.8	5.8	4.6	2.4	0.1	0.0	0.0	0.0	0.0	0.8	3.8	5.4	29.7
Source 1: NOAA
Source 2: XMACIS2 (mean maxima/minima, snow/snow days/snow depth 1981–2010)
