= Lucy Hayward Barker =

American painter

- Born: November 29, 1872; Portage Lake, Maine, U.S.
- Died: November 16, 1948 (aged 75)
- Education: School of the Museum of Fine Arts, Boston
- Occupation: Painter

Lucy Ellen Hayward Barker (November 29, 1872 – November 16, 1948) was an American painter.

Born in Portage Lake, Maine, Barker attended St. John's Academy in Presque Isle, before spending two years at St. Catherine's Hall, an Episcopal school in Augusta. She then studied at the School of the Museum of Fine Arts in Boston; her instructors included Frank Weston Benson, Alger V. Currier, Philip Leslie Hale, and Edmund Charles Tarbell. Associated with the American Impressionists, she kept a studio in Boston from 1898 until her marriage to Roy Barker in 1906. After motherhood, in 1929, she resumed her career in Maine, working in Presque Isle. She is buried in that town's Fairmount Cemetery; her daughter claimed that she literally died "with a paint brush in her hand".

A drawing of Alice Tobey by Barker is in the collection of the Metropolitan Museum of Art, and her work is also owned by the Fine Arts Museums of San Francisco and the Pennsylvania Academy of the Fine Arts. One of her pieces is in the Cathedral Church of St. Luke in Portland. A collection of her papers, donated by her daughter, is owned by the Archives of American Art at the Smithsonian Institution.
