= Aroostook State Park =

State park in Aroostook County, Maine

- Location within Maine
- Interactive map of Aroostook State Park
- Location: Presque Isle, Maine, United States
- Coordinates: 46°36′56″N 68°00′29″W
- Area: 898 acres (363 ha)
- Elevation: 978 ft (298 m)
- Established: 1938
- Administrator: Maine Department of Agriculture, Conservation and Forestry
- Website: Official website
- Maine State Parks

Aroostook State Park is public recreation area within the southern municipal boundary of the city of Presque Isle in Aroostook County, Maine. The state park's 898 acres (363 ha) encompass Quaggy Jo Mountain and sit adjacent to Echo Lake. "Quaggy Jo" is an altered version of the mountain's Native American name, "Qua Qua Jo", which means "twin-peaked."

The park is off U.S. Route 1 on the south side of Presque Isle. The similarly named Aroostook National Wildlife Refuge is some 30 miles (48 km) to the north.

== History ==
The park was formed in 1938 as the first of Maine's state parks three years after the creation of the Maine State Park Commission. It was formed through the donation of 100 acres (40 ha) of land by business persons from the Presque Isle Merchants Association. The park's first ski runs were built by a 35-member crew from the Works Progress Administration. In 1960, lift fees were $1 per person and the ski season was from approximately January 15 to April 15.

In 2009, the park was expanded with the addition of 145.6 acres (58.9 ha), which cost the Department of Conservation $60,000.

== Wildlife ==
While the park's forest provides a home for black bear and moose, smaller species such as foxes, squirrels, and chipmunks are more commonly seen by visitors. The forest's mix of hardwood trees and cold-tolerant softwoods typical of northern Maine includes various species of ash, maple, and birch, as well as hophornbeam, quaking aspen, American beech, and balsam fir. Common birds include hawks, owls, and woodpeckers. Brook trout are found in Echo Lake.

== Activities and amenities ==
The park offers a 30-site campground and trails for hiking, cross-country skiing, and snowshoeing. Swimming, fishing, and canoeing are offered on Echo Lake.
