= Fairmount Cemetery (Presque Isle, Maine) =

Historic cemetery in Aroostook County, Maine, US

- Interactive map of Fairmount Cemetery

Details
- Established: 1864
- Location: Presque Isle, Maine
- Country: United States
- Coordinates: 46°39′50″N 68°00′29″W
- Owned by: Fairmount Cemetery Association
- Size: 30 acres (12 ha)
- No. of graves: ~6,000
- Find a Grave: Fairmount Cemetery

Fairmount Cemetery is a historic cemetery in Presque Isle, Aroostook County, Maine. It is the largest cemetery in northern Maine, with over 30 acres of dedicated land. It overlooks the University of Maine at Presque Isle campus in the south of the city. More than 6,000 people are interred in the cemetery, including over 700 veterans. The cemetery was established in 1864 as a burial place for area Civil War veterans and is managed by the Fairmount Cemetery Association.

In 2009, a partnership began between the University of Maine at Presque Isle and the cemetery to create a database for historic, cultural, and social research that would be accessible via the Internet and use GPS and GIS technology. It involved at least five departments and multiple paid research assistants from the university. In 2012, upon completion of the project, a website was unveiled that produced a Web-based map of the cemetery, including detailed information on those interred.

Among those buried at Fairmount Cemetery are the painter Lucy Hayward Barker and fashion designer Jessica McClintock.
