= Daigle, Maine =

- Unincorporated community
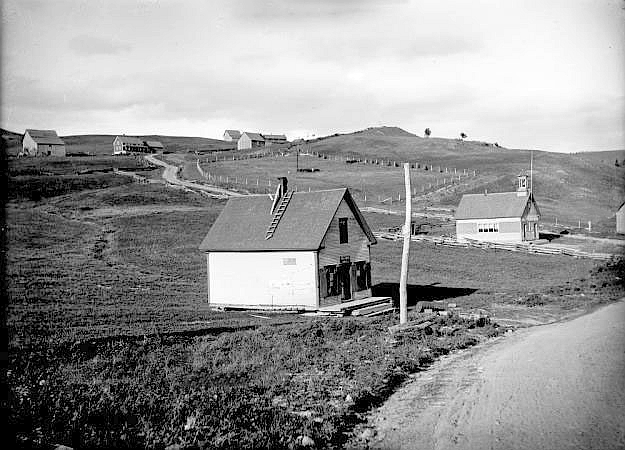
- Daigle, 1915

- Location within Maine Location within the United States
- Coordinates: 47°11′22″N 68°27′39″W
- Country: United States
- State: Maine
- County: Aroostook
- Town: New Canada
- Established: 1858
- Elevation: 712 ft (217 m)
- Time zone: UTC-5 (Eastern (EST))
  - Summer (DST): UTC-4 (EDT)
- ZIP Code: 04743 (New Canada)
- GNIS feature ID: 564738

Daigle is an unincorporated community in the town of New Canada, in Aroostook County, Maine, United States. It is the only named community in the town.

The settlement is located 8 mi (13 km) south of Fort Kent. Daigle Pond and Dam are located there.

== History ==
The first settlers were Vital Daigle and his wife Julie Cyr. They came from nearby Frenchville, Maine, seeking a new home for their family. The deed to the property was dated 1858, and listed 13 Daigle family members.

Other settlers from Frenchville followed, and the small community of Daigle developed.

In 1882, Vital Daigle developed a property called "New Canada Plantation" south of the family homestead, where Daigle manufactured lumber. The township adopted the name "New Canada".

Daigle had a post office from 1899 to 1933, and Vital Daigle was the first postmaster.

A church called Holy Family Parish was built in 1906. A cemetery was also established. In 1909, the church was destroyed by fire, but was rebuilt the following year. The church closed in 2000 and was demolished, and a monument was erected to mark its place. The property was sold to the town of New Canada, where a community center was to be built. The cemetery is extant, and contains the graves of many early families.
