= Eagle Hill (Louisiana) =

Mountain in Louisiana, United States

- Location within Louisiana

Highest point
- Elevation: 459 feet (140 m)
- Coordinates: 31°24′00″N 93°17′02″W

Geography
- Location: Sabine Parish, Louisiana, U.S.
- Topo map: USGS Peason

Eagle Hill (French: Colline d'Aigle) is a mountain in Sabine Parish, Louisiana, United States. It is among the highest points in Louisiana, with 459 feet at its highest.

== Location ==
Eagle Hill is located approximately 2 miles (3.2 km) south of Peason, Louisiana. It is also about 4 miles (6.4 km) west of the Kisatchie National Forest. This hill is primarily part of the foothills leading to the Ouachita Mountains in Arkansas.
