= Peason, Louisiana =

Peason
- Community, Ghost town
- Location within the state of Louisiana
- Coordinates: 31°24′49.6404″N 93°17′40.6062″W 31.4137888, -93.2946134
- Country: United States
- State: Louisiana
- Parish: Sabine Parish
- Time zone: UTC-6 (Central (CST))
  - Summer (DST): UTC-5 (CDT)

Louisiana Highway 118
- Location: Florien–Kisatchie
- Length: 26.89 mi (43.28 km)
- Existed: 1955–present

Peason is a small populated community and sawmill ghost town located on Louisiana highway 118 approximately 8.7 miles (14.0 km) east of Hornbeck, and the sawmill ghost town of Sandel, in Sabine Parish, Louisiana.

The Peavy Wilson mill ran from 1918 to 1929 before being transported to Florida.

== History ==
As the northern lumber began to cut out additional locations were sought. After the railroad came through Louisiana it allowed a way for lumber to be shipped to market. Anderson J. "Jasper" Peavy (A.J.) worked his way up in the lumber industry in Texas becoming president of Peavy-Byrnes Lumber Company, Peavy-Moore Lumber Company, and Peavy-Welsh Lumber Company. In 1916 Peavy received backing, purchased 40,000 acres (16,000 ha) in Ward 1, Sabine Parish, and went into partnership with Riley J. Wilson, forming the Peavy Wilson Lumber Company. A site was selected in 1917 and construction was completed in 1918. The name chosen for the town was Peason that was an acronym of the first and last names of the partners.

Twelve miles of "tap line" track was laid from Peason to just north of Hornbeck at Sandel (south of Ayers and Gandy) connecting to the Kansas City Southern Railroad and named the Christie and Eastern Railroad. The line went through Davis and the turpentine mill of Shutts. Later the tracks were extended east to connect to the Red River and Gulf Line at Kurthwood, Louisiana.

Peavy made Shreveport his headquarters and home until his death.

On January 9, 2022, a strong EF2 tornado impacted the town, damaging about 30 homes, 10 to 15 of which were heavily damaged or destroyed. Six people were injured, including all five people in a mobile home that was destroyed, some critically.
