= Oxbow, Maine =

Oxbow North, Maine
- Township
- Nickname: Oxbow
- Location of Oxbow, Maine
- Coordinates: 46°25′35″N 68°29′06″W
- Country: United States
- State: Maine
- County: Aroostook

Area
  - Total: 38.3 sq mi (99.1 km^{2})
  - Land: 37.8 sq mi (97.9 km^{2})
  - Water: 0.46 sq mi (1.2 km^{2})
- Elevation: 600 ft (180 m)

Population (2010)
  - Total: 66
  - Density: 1.7/sq mi (0.67/km^{2})
- Time zone: UTC-5 (Eastern (EST))
  - Summer (DST): UTC-4 (EDT)
- ZIP code: 04764
- Area code: 207
- FIPS code: 23-56205
- GNIS feature ID: 582657

Oxbow, officially Oxbow North and Township 9 Range 6, is an unincorporated township in Aroostook County, Maine, United States and part of the state's Unorganized Territory. The population was 66 at the 2010 census. As of 2016, the population was estimated to be 50.

== History ==
Oxbow was first settled in 1842 by Elias and Samuel Hayden, who had previously resided in Somerset County, Maine. More settlers came to set up farms and mills, which spurred residents to incorporate as Oxbow Plantation in 1870. In 1994, an attempt to deorganize was defeated by a vote of 21–9. In November 2015, Oxbow residents voted unanimously to deorganize, which was largely driven by a need to lower property tax rates. In March 2016, a panel of the Maine Legislature voted to accept the plantation's attempt to deorganize. In November 2016, residents voted 37–2 to move forward with the process. The plantation was officially deorganized on July 1, 2017.

== Geography ==
According to the United States Census Bureau, the township has a total area of 38.3 square miles (99.1 km^{2}), of which 37.8 square miles (97.9 km^{2}) is land and 0.46 square miles (1.2 km^{2}), or 1.22%, is water.

== Demographics ==
Historical population
Census	Pop.	Note	%±
1870	100		—
1880	127		27.0%
1890	94		−26.0%
1900	153		62.8%
1910	181		18.3%
1920	198		9.4%
1930	176		−11.1%
1940	178		1.1%
1950	189		6.2%
1960	137		−27.5%
1970	92		−32.8%
1980	84		−8.7%
1990	69		−17.9%
2000	56		−18.8%
2010	66		17.9%
2016 (est.)	50		−24.2%
U.S. Decennial Census

As of the census of 2000, there were 56 people, 29 households, and 20 families residing in the township. The population density was 1.5 inhabitants per square mile (0.58/km^{2}). There were 83 housing units at an average density of 2.2 per square mile (0.85/km^{2}). The racial makeup of the township was 100.00% White. Hispanic or Latino of any race were 1.79% of the population.

There were 29 households, out of which 13.8% had children under the age of 18 living with them, 62.1% were married couples living together, 6.9% had a female householder with no husband present, and 31.0% were non-families. 24.1% of all households were made up of individuals, and 20.7% had someone living alone who was 65 years of age or older. The average household size was 1.93 and the average family size was 2.20.

In the township, the population was spread out, with 8.9% under the age of 18, 5.4% from 18 to 24, 17.9% from 25 to 44, 35.7% from 45 to 64, and 32.1% who were 65 years of age or older. The median age was 52 years. For every 100 females there were 107.4 males. For every 100 females age 18 and over, there were 96.2 males.

The median income for a household in the township was $33,333, and the median income for a family was $35,000. Males had a median income of $37,917 versus $28,750 for females. The per capita income for the township was $15,247. There were 18.2% of families and 21.6% of the population living below the poverty line, including 50.0% of under eighteens and none of those over 64.

== Education ==
The Maine Department of Education takes responsibility for coordinating school assignments in the unorganized territory. The state assigns Oxbow to Maine School Administrative District 32, Ashland District School. When Oxbow was a plantation, it was directly under the School Administrative District 32.
