= Ashland (CDP), Maine =

Ashland, Maine
- Census-designated place
- Location of Ashland, Maine
- Coordinates: 46°37′55″N 68°23′40″W
- Country: United States
- State: Maine
- County: Aroostook
- Town: Ashland

Area
  - Total: 4.48 sq mi (11.61 km^{2})
  - Land: 4.46 sq mi (11.55 km^{2})
  - Water: 0.023 sq mi (0.06 km^{2})
- Elevation: 745 ft (227 m)

Population (2020)
  - Total: 639
  - Density: 143.3/sq mi (55.33/km^{2})
- Time zone: UTC-5 (Eastern (EST))
  - Summer (DST): UTC-4 (EDT)
- ZIP code: 04732
- Area code: 207
- FIPS code: 23-01675
- GNIS feature ID: 2583553

Ashland is a census-designated place (CDP) comprising the main village within the town of Ashland in Aroostook County, Maine, United States. The population of the CDP was 709 at the 2010 census, out of a population of 1,309 for the entire town.

== Geography ==
The Ashland CDP is located along the Aroostook River near the center of the town of Ashland. Maine State Routes 11, 227 and 163 intersect at the center of the CDP.

According to the United States Census Bureau, the CDP has a total area of 4.5 square miles (11.6 km^{2}), of which 4.4 square miles (11.5 km^{2}) is land and 0.039 square miles (0.1 km^{2}), or 0.52%, is water.

== Demographics ==
Historical population
Census	Pop.	Note	%±
2020	639		—
U.S. Decennial Census
