= Winterville Plantation, Maine =

Winterville Plantation Plantation de la Ville d'hiver
- Plantation
- Location of Winterville Plantation, Maine
- Coordinates: 46°59′13″N 68°36′16″W
- Country: United States
- State: Maine
- County: Aroostook

Area
  - Total: 39.0 sq mi (101.0 km^{2})
  - Land: 35.6 sq mi (92.2 km^{2})
  - Water: 3.4 sq mi (8.8 km^{2})
- Elevation: 584 ft (178 m)

Population (2020)
  - Total: 194
  - Density: 5.45/sq mi (2.10/km^{2})
- Time zone: UTC-5 (Eastern (EST))
  - Summer (DST): UTC-4 (EDT)
- ZIP code: 04739
- Area code: 207
- FIPS code: 23-86865
- GNIS feature ID: 582823

Winterville Plantation (French: Plantation de la Ville d'hiver) is a plantation in Aroostook County, Maine, United States. The population was 194 at the 2020 census.

== Geography ==
According to the United States Census Bureau, the plantation has a total area of 39.0 square miles (101.0 km^{2}), of which 35.6 square miles (92.2 km^{2}) is land and 3.4 square miles (8.8 km^{2}), or 8.74%, is water.

== Demographics ==
Historical population
Census	Pop.	Note	%±
1880	101		—
1890	72		−28.7%
1900	124		72.2%
1910	267		115.3%
1920	353		32.2%
1930	408		15.6%
1940	462		13.2%
1950	373		−19.3%
1960	215		−42.4%
1970	164		−23.7%
1980	235		43.3%
1990	217		−7.7%
2000	196		−9.7%
2010	224		14.3%
2020	194		−13.4%
U.S. Decennial Census

At the 2000 census there were 196 people, 79 households, and 57 families living in the plantation. The population density was 5.5 inhabitants per square mile (2.1/km^{2}). There were 261 housing units at an average density of 7.3 per square mile (2.8/km^{2}). The racial makeup of the plantation was 97.96% White, 0.51% Native American, and 1.53% from two or more races. Hispanic or Latino of any race were 1.02%.

Of the 79 households 26.6% had children under the age of 18 living with them, 65.8% were married couples living together, 5.1% had a female householder with no husband present, and 26.6% were non-families. 24.1% of households were one person and 12.7% were one person aged 65 or older. The average household size was 2.42 and the average family size was 2.86.

The age distribution was 25.0% under the age of 18, 4.1% from 18 to 24, 21.9% from 25 to 44, 31.1% from 45 to 64, and 17.9% 65 or older. The median age was 44 years. For every 100 females, there were 113.0 males. For every 100 females age 18 and over, there were 116.2 males.

The median household income was $27,917 and the median family income was $33,250. Males had a median income of $29,167 versus $23,750 for females. The per capita income for the plantation was $14,376. About 10.1% of families and 8.2% of the population were below the poverty line, including 5.3% of those under the age of 18 and none of those 65 or over.
