= St. Francis, Maine =

Town in Maine, United States

St. Francis Saint-François
- Town
- Location of St. Francis, Maine
- Coordinates: 47°08′20″N 68°52′42″W
- Country: United States
- State: Maine
- County: Aroostook
- Villages: St. Francis; Back Settlement; Bradbury

Area
  - Total: 30.36 sq mi (78.63 km^{2})
  - Land: 29.92 sq mi (77.49 km^{2})
  - Water: 0.44 sq mi (1.14 km^{2})
- Elevation: 1,093 ft (333 m)

Population (2020)
  - Total: 438
  - Density: 15/sq mi (5.7/km^{2})
- Time zone: UTC-5 (Eastern (EST))
  - Summer (DST): UTC-4 (EDT)
- Zip Code: 04774
- Area code: 207
- FIPS code: 23-65025
- GNIS feature ID: 582708
- Website: stfrancisme.com582708

St. Francis or Saint Francis (French: Saint-François) is a town in Aroostook County, Maine, United States on the Canada–United States border at the junction of the St. Francis River and the Saint John River. The population was 438 at the 2020 census. First settled by English speakers from southern Maine, the original population has been supplanted by French-speaking Acadians.

== Geography ==
According to the United States Census Bureau, the town has a total area of 30.36 square miles (78.63 km^{2}), of which 29.92 square miles (77.49 km^{2}) is land and 0.44 square miles (1.14 km^{2}) is water.

== Demographics ==
Historical population
Census	Pop.	Note	%±
1870	253		—
1880	299		18.2%
1890	461		54.2%
1900	568		23.2%
1910	918		61.6%
1920	1,241		35.2%
1930	1,367		10.2%
1940	1,489		8.9%
1950	1,384		−7.1%
1960	1,058		−23.6%
1970	811		−23.3%
1980	839		3.5%
1990	683		−18.6%
2000	577		−15.5%
2010	485		−15.9%
2020	438		−9.7%
U.S. Decennial Census

=== 2010 census ===
As of the census of 2010, there were 485 people, 234 households, and 143 families living in the town. The population density was 16.2 inhabitants per square mile (6.3/km^{2}). There were 316 housing units at an average density of 10.6 per square mile (4.1/km^{2}). The racial makeup of the town was 96.9% White, 1.9% Native American, and 1.2% from two or more races. Hispanic or Latino of any race were 0.6% of the population.

There were 234 households, of which 19.2% had children under the age of 18 living with them, 49.6% were married couples living together, 8.1% had a female householder with no husband present, 3.4% had a male householder with no wife present, and 38.9% were non-families. 33.8% of all households were made up of individuals, and 11.5% had someone living alone who was 65 years of age or older. The average household size was 2.07 and the average family size was 2.61.

The median age in the town was 51.3 years. 15.1% of residents were under the age of 18; 4.2% were between the ages of 18 and 24; 21.2% were from 25 to 44; 36.8% were from 45 to 64; and 22.5% were 65 years of age or older. The gender makeup of the town was 50.1% male and 49.9% female.

=== 2000 census ===
Languages (2000)	Percent
Spoke French at home	61.06%
Spoke English at home	38.94%

As of the census of 2000, there were 577 people, 236 households, and 172 families living in the town. The population density was 19.4 people per square mile (7.5/km^{2}). There were 336 housing units at an average density of 11.3 per square mile (4.4/km^{2}). The racial makeup of the town was 100.00% White.

There were 236 households, out of which 26.7% had children under the age of 18 living with them, 59.3% were married couples living together, 9.7% had a female householder with no husband present, and 26.7% were non-families. 24.6% of all households were made up of individuals, and 14.0% had someone living alone who was 65 years of age or older. The average household size was 2.44 and the average family size was 2.83.

In the town, the population was spread out, with 20.8% under the age of 18, 8.1% from 18 to 24, 23.9% from 25 to 44, 28.1% from 45 to 64, and 19.1% who were 65 years of age or older. The median age was 43 years. For every 100 females, there were 93.0 males. For every 100 females age 18 and over, there were 94.5 males.

The median income for a household in the town was $25,125, and the median income for a family was $35,333. Males had a median income of $24,688 versus $20,469 for females. The per capita income for the town was $13,496. About 3.8% of families and 7.7% of the population were below the poverty line, including none of those under age 18 and 16.3% of those age 65 or over.

== Education ==
There was one school, which was called the St. Francis Elementary School, and was part of the Maine School Administrative District 27. The school was closed in 2016. Pre-K–5 students from St. Francis now attend Fort Kent Elementary School in Fort Kent, Maine, which is also part of the Maine School Administrative District 27. The St. Francis town office now occupies the building.
