= Caswell, Maine =

Town in Maine, United States

- Town
- Location of Caswell, Maine
- Coordinates: 46°59′52″N 67°51′52″W
- Country: United States
- State: Maine
- County: Aroostook
- Village: Caswell Plantation

Area
  - Total: 41.56 sq mi (107.64 km^{2})
  - Land: 41.30 sq mi (106.97 km^{2})
  - Water: 0.26 sq mi (0.67 km^{2})
- Elevation: 794 ft (242 m)

Population (2020)
  - Total: 293
  - Density: 7.0/sq mi (2.7/km^{2})
- Time zone: UTC-5 (Eastern (EST))
  - Summer (DST): UTC-4 (EDT)
- ZIP Codes: 04750 (Caswell); 04736 (Caribou)
- Area code: 207
- FIPS code: 23-11335
- GNIS feature ID: 582398

Caswell is a town in Aroostook County, Maine, United States. The population was 293 at the 2020 census.

== History ==
The town was first organized on April 14, 1879, as Pleasant Ridge Plantation, before being reorganized and renamed after the towns first settler R.S. Caswell. It has suffered a large decline in population since its peak, largely due to the closure of the nearby Loring Air Force Base in 1994.

== Geography ==
According to the United States Census Bureau, the town has a total area of 41.56 square miles (107.64 km^{2}), of which 41.30 square miles (106.97 km^{2}) is land and 0.26 square miles (0.67 km^{2}) is water.

=== Adjacent municipalities ===
- Hamlin (north)
- Grand Falls, New Brunswick (east)
- Drummond Parish, New Brunswick (southeast)
- Limestone (south)
- Connor (west)

== Demographics ==
Historical population
Census	Pop.	Note	%±
1890	212		—
1900	368		73.6%
1910	529		43.8%
1920	558		5.5%
1930	642		15.1%
1940	650		1.2%
1950	687		5.7%
1960	853		24.2%
1970	693		−18.8%
1980	586		−15.4%
1990	408		−30.4%
2000	326		−20.1%
2010	306		−6.1%
2020	293		−4.2%
U.S. Decennial Census

=== 2010 census ===
As of the census of 2010, there were 306 people, 134 households, and 91 families living in the town. The population density was 7.4 inhabitants per square mile (2.9/km^{2}). There were 176 housing units at an average density of 4.3 per square mile (1.7/km^{2}). The racial makeup of the town was 96.4% White, 0.3% African American, 2.6% Native American, and 0.7% from two or more races. Hispanic or Latino of any race were 0.3% of the population.

There were 134 households, of which 32.8% had children under the age of 18 living with them, 44.8% were married couples living together, 11.9% had a female householder with no husband present, 11.2% had a male householder with no wife present, and 32.1% were non-families. 28.4% of all households were made up of individuals, and 14.2% had someone living alone who was 65 years of age or older. The average household size was 2.28 and the average family size was 2.68.

The median age in the town was 45.3 years. 22.9% of residents were under the age of 18; 2% were between the ages of 18 and 24; 24.5% were from 25 to 44; 26.1% were from 45 to 64; and 24.5% were 65 years of age or older. The gender makeup of the town was 50.0% male and 50.0% female.

=== 2000 census ===
Languages (2000)	Percent
Spoke English at home	62.04%
Spoke French at home	37.96%

As of the census of 2000, there were 326 people, 135 households, and 100 families living in the town. The population density was 7.9 inhabitants per square mile (3.1/km^{2}). There were 160 housing units at an average density of 3.9 per square mile (1.5/km^{2}). The racial makeup of the town was 95.71% White, 0.92% African American, 1.84% Native American, 1.53% from other races. Hispanic or Latino of any race were 2.15% of the population.

There were 135 households, out of which 25.2% had children under the age of 18 living with them, 60.0% were married couples living together, 8.9% had a female householder with no husband present, and 25.9% were non-families. 19.3% of all households were made up of individuals, and 7.4% had someone living alone who was 65 years of age or older. The average household size was 2.41 and the average family size was 2.78.

In the town, the population was spread out, with 19.9% under the age of 18, 6.1% from 18 to 24, 27.3% from 25 to 44, 28.8% from 45 to 64, and 17.8% who were 65 years of age or older. The median age was 43 years. For every 100 females, there were 100.0 males. For every 100 females age 18 and over, there were 105.5 males.

The median income for a household in the town was $20,625, and the median income for a family was $23,000. Males had a median income of $27,500 versus $21,406 for females. The per capita income for the town was $13,118. About 16.3% of families and 19.8% of the population were below the poverty line, including 8.9% of those under age 18 and 38.3% of those age 65 or over.

== Notable person ==
- Bernard Ayotte, state representative
