= Garfield Plantation, Maine =

- Plantation
- Location of Garfield Plantation, Maine
- Coordinates: 46°36′52″N 68°29′57″W
- Country: United States
- State: Maine
- County: Aroostook

Area
  - Total: 38.6 sq mi (99.9 km^{2})
  - Land: 38.3 sq mi (99.2 km^{2})
  - Water: 0.27 sq mi (0.7 km^{2})
- Elevation: 610 ft (190 m)

Population (2020)
  - Total: 79
  - Density: 2.1/sq mi (0.80/km^{2})
- Time zone: UTC-5 (Eastern (EST))
  - Summer (DST): UTC-4 (EDT)
- ZIP code: 04732
- Area code: 207
- FIPS code: 23-27120
- GNIS feature ID: 582487

Garfield Plantation is a plantation in Aroostook County, Maine, United States. The population was 79 at the 2020 census.

== History ==
Garfield Plantation is named for James A. Garfield, the 20th President of the United States.

== Geography ==
According to the United States Census Bureau, the plantation has a total area of 38.6 square miles (99.9 km^{2}), of which 38.3 square miles (99.2 km^{2}) is land and 0.27 square miles (0.7 km^{2}), or 0.71%, is water.

== Demographics ==
Historical population
Census	Pop.	Note	%±
1880	80		—
1890	86		7.5%
1900	111		29.1%
1910	121		9.0%
1920	142		17.4%
1930	91		−35.9%
1940	97		6.6%
1950	116		19.6%
1960	89		−23.3%
1970	104		16.9%
1980	107		2.9%
1990	102		−4.7%
2000	86		−15.7%
2010	81		−5.8%
2020	79		−2.5%
U.S. Decennial Census

At the 2000 census, there were 86 people, 37 households, and 24 families living in the plantation. The population density was 2.3 people per square mile (0.9/km^{2}). There were 78 housing units at an average density of 2.0 per square mile (0.8/km^{2}). The racial makeup of the plantation was 100.00% White. Of the 37 households 27.0% had children under the age of 18 living with them, 48.6% were married couples living together, 8.1% had a female householder with no husband present, and 35.1% were non-families. 27.0% of households were one person and 18.9% were one person aged 65 or older. The average household size was 2.32 and the average family size was 2.67.

The age distribution was 17.4% under the age of 18, 10.5% from 18 to 24, 23.3% from 25 to 44, 27.9% from 45 to 64, and 20.9% 65 or older. The median age was 44 years. For every 100 females, there were 100.0 males. For every 100 females age 18 and over, there were 121.9 males.

The median household income was $31,250 and the median family income was $33,750. Males had a median income of $28,750 versus $0 for females. The per capita income for the plantation was $15,455. There were 13.6% of families and 19.2% of the population living below the poverty line, including 47.1% of under eighteens and 5.9% of those over 64.
