= Patten (CDP), Maine =

Patten, Maine
- Census-designated place
- Location within Maine Location within the United States
- Coordinates: 45°59′59″N 68°26′34″W
- Country: United States
- State: Maine
- County: Penobscot
- Town: Patten

Area
  - Total: 1.99 sq mi (5.15 km^{2})
  - Land: 1.99 sq mi (5.15 km^{2})
  - Water: 0 sq mi (0.00 km^{2})
- Elevation: 584 ft (178 m)

Population (2020)
  - Total: 539
  - Density: 271.0/sq mi (104.64/km^{2})
- Time zone: UTC-5 (Eastern (EST))
  - Summer (DST): UTC-4 (EDT)
- ZIP Code: 04765
- Area code: 207
- FIPS code: 23-57115
- GNIS feature ID: 2806287

Patten is a census-designated place (CDP) and the primary village in the town of Patten, Penobscot County, Maine, United States. It is in the northeastern part of the town, mostly on the north side of Fish Stream, an eastward-flowing tributary of the West Branch Mattawamkeag River and part of the Penobscot River watershed.

Maine State Route 11 passes through the village, leading north 47 miles (76 km) to Ashland and south 9 miles (14 km) to Sherman and Interstate 95. State Route 159 leads east 10 miles (16 km) from Patten to Island Falls and the same distance northwest to Shin Pond.

Patten was first listed as a CDP prior to the 2020 census.

== Demographics ==
Historical population
Census	Pop.	Note	%±
2020	539		—
U.S. Decennial Census
