= Blaine (CDP), Maine =

Blaine, Maine
- Census-designated place
- Location of Blaine, Maine
- Coordinates: 46°30′07″N 67°52′08″W
- Country: United States
- State: Maine
- County: Aroostook
- Town: Blaine

Area
  - Total: 2.73 sq mi (7.07 km^{2})
  - Land: 2.73 sq mi (7.07 km^{2})
  - Water: 0 sq mi (0.00 km^{2})
- Elevation: 528 ft (161 m)

Population (2020)
  - Total: 250
  - Density: 91.6/sq mi (35.36/km^{2})
- Time zone: UTC-5 (Eastern (EST))
  - Summer (DST): UTC-4 (EDT)
- ZIP code: 04734
- Area code: 207
- FIPS code: 23-05350
- GNIS feature ID: 2652330

Blaine is a census-designated place (CDP) comprising the main village within the town of Blaine in Aroostook County, Maine, United States. The population of the CDP was 301 at the 2010 census, out of a population of 726 for the entire town. Prior to 2010, the village was part of the Mars Hill-Blaine CDP.

== Geography ==
The Blaine CDP is located along the northern edge of the town of Blaine, bordered by the town of Mars Hill to the north. U.S. Route 1 runs through the center of the CDP, leading north 15 miles (24 km) to Presque Isle and south 26 miles (42 km) to Houlton.

According to the United States Census Bureau, the CDP has a total area of 2.7 square miles (7.1 km^{2}), all land.

== Demographics ==
Historical population
Census	Pop.	Note	%±
2020	250		—
U.S. Decennial Census
