= New Canada, Maine =

Town in Maine, United States

New Canada Nouveau-Canada
- Town
- Location of New Canada, Maine
- Coordinates: 47°08′30″N 68°30′16″W
- Country: United States
- State: Maine
- County: Aroostook
- Village: Daigle

Area
  - Total: 36.36 sq mi (94.17 km^{2})
  - Land: 35.78 sq mi (92.67 km^{2})
  - Water: 0.58 sq mi (1.50 km^{2})
- Elevation: 837 ft (255 m)

Population (2020)
  - Total: 310
  - Density: 8.5/sq mi (3.3/km^{2})
- Time zone: UTC-5 (Eastern (EST))
  - Summer (DST): UTC-4 (EDT)
- ZIP Codes: 04743 (New Canada); 04781 (Wallagrass)
- Area code: 207
- FIPS code: 23-48575
- GNIS feature ID: 582616

New Canada (French: Nouveau-Canada) is a town in Aroostook County, Maine, United States. The population was 310 at the 2020 census.

== Geography ==
According to the United States Census Bureau, the town has a total area of 36.36 square miles (94.17 km^{2}), of which 35.78 square miles (92.67 km^{2}) is land and 0.58 square miles (1.50 km^{2}) is water.

== Demographics ==
Historical population
Census	Pop.	Note	%±
1890	301		—
1900	419		39.2%
1910	590		40.8%
1920	573		−2.9%
1930	538		−6.1%
1940	633		17.7%
1950	444		−29.9%
1960	288		−35.1%
1970	300		4.2%
1980	269		−10.3%
1990	253		−5.9%
2000	306		20.9%
2010	321		4.9%
2020	310		−3.4%
U.S. Decennial Census

=== 2010 census ===
As of the census of 2010, there were 321 people, 115 households, and 88 families living in the town. The population density was 9.0 inhabitants per square mile (3.5/km^{2}). There were 146 housing units at an average density of 4.1 units per square mile (1.6 units/km^{2}). The racial makeup of the town was 95.0% White, 0.3% Native American, and 4.7% from two or more races. Hispanic or Latino of any race were 1.9% of the population.

There were 115 households, of which 35.7% had children under the age of 18 living with them, 60.9% were married couples living together, 4.3% had a female householder with no husband present, 11.3% had a male householder with no wife present, and 23.5% were non-families. 15.7% of all households were made up of individuals, and 6.1% had someone living alone who was 65 years of age or older. The average household size was 2.79 and the average family size was 3.10.

The median age in the town was 41.3 years. 27.4% of residents were under the age of 18; 6.5% were between the ages of 18 and 24; 22.1% were from 25 to 44; 30.8% were from 45 to 64; and 13.1% were 65 years of age or older. The gender makeup of the town was 53.9% male and 46.1% female.

=== 2000 census ===
As of the census of 2000, there were 306 people, 108 households, and 89 families living in the town. The population density was 8.5 people per square mile (3.3 people/km^{2}). There were 121 housing units at an average density of 3.4 units per square mile (1.3 units/km^{2}). The racial makeup of the town was 99.02% White, 0.33% African American and 0.65% Native American.

There were 108 households, out of which 38.9% had children under the age of 18 living with them, 73.1% were married couples living together, 1.9% had a female householder with no husband present, and 16.7% were non-families. 13.0% of all households were made up of individuals, and 5.6% had someone living alone who was 65 years of age or older. The average household size was 2.83 and the average family size was 3.09.

In the town, the population was spread out, with 28.1% under the age of 18, 5.6% from 18 to 24, 32.7% from 25 to 44, 23.5% from 45 to 64, and 10.1% who were 65 years of age or older. The median age was 34 years. For every 100 females, there were 102.6 males. For every 100 females age 18 and over, there were 105.6 males.

The median income for a household in the town was $38,000, and the median income for a family was $39,500. Males had a median income of $30,962 versus $13,750 for females. The per capita income for the town was $15,415. About 8.2% of families and 9.6% of the population were below the poverty line, including 16.1% of those under the age of eighteen and none of those 65 or over.
