= Limestone, Maine =

Town in the United States

- Town
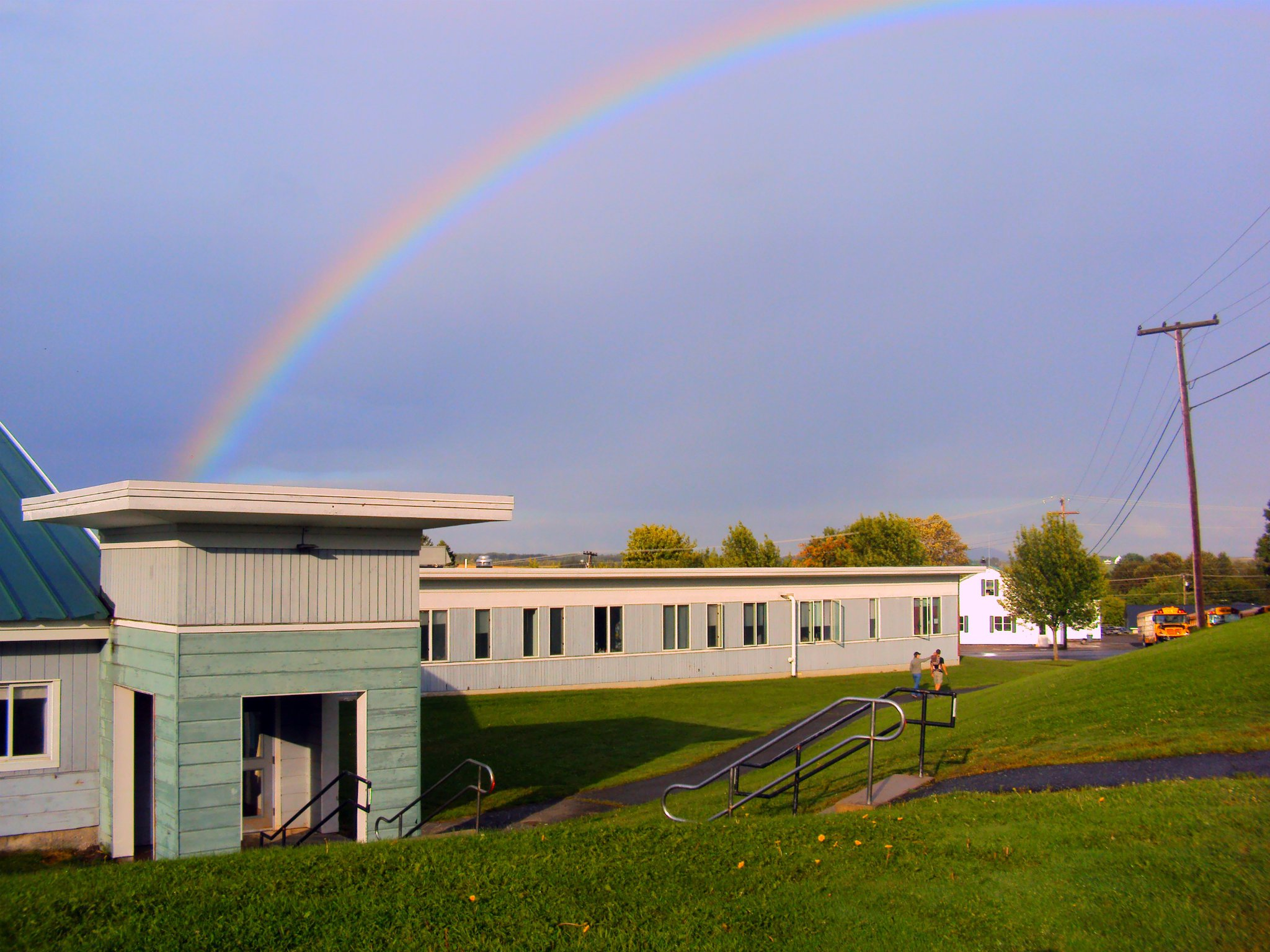
- Rainbow over Limestone in August 2011

- Flag
- Motto: "Experience our quality of life"
- Location of Limestone, Maine
- Coordinates: 46°53′50″N 67°52′46″W
- Country: United States
- State: Maine
- County: Aroostook
- Village: Limestone

Area
  - Total: 40.79 sq mi (105.65 km^{2})
  - Land: 40.49 sq mi (104.87 km^{2})
  - Water: 0.30 sq mi (0.78 km^{2})
- Elevation: 699 ft (213 m)

Population (2020)
  - Total: 1,526
  - Density: 38/sq mi (14.6/km^{2})
- Time zone: UTC-5 (Eastern (EST))
  - Summer (DST): UTC-4 (EDT)
- ZIP code: 04750
- Area code: 207
- GNIS feature ID: 582557
- Website: www.limestonemaine.org

Limestone is a town in Aroostook County, Maine, United States. The population was 1,526 at the 2020 census.

The town is best known for being the home of the Loring Commerce Centre (formerly Loring Air Force Base; also lying on its former territory is the Aroostook National Wildlife Refuge). The Maine School of Science and Mathematics (MSSM), which in 2019 ranked #2 in the United States by U.S. News & World Report, is located in the town itself, sharing its campus with the town high school.

The population center of the town is in Limestone (CDP), in the east-central part of the town.

== History ==
Mark Trafton (1785–1857) settled Limestone in 1849 when he was customs officer of Fort Fairfield; Trafton would later serve in the Maine House of Representatives in the early 1850s. Trafton, his son, and an associate co-founded the Limestone Mill Company three years earlier in 1846. Limestone was incorporated as a town on March 17, 1869, and was named for regional limestone deposits.

In 1952, the United States Air Force opened Loring Air Force Base near Limestone. The population of Limestone peaked at 13,102 in 1960. Following a recommendation by the 1991 Base Realignment and Closure Commission, Loring Air Force Base closed on September 30, 1994. The Maine School of Science and Mathematics, opened in 1995 as a public residential high school for gifted students, shares a building and campus with the town high school. Although the structure was formerly subsidized by the USAF to service its dependents, it also served the children of town residents. The school structure was not located on the Loring AFB itself, rather being situated in the town.

The Wall Street Journal reported in 2024 that since the closure of Loring AFB, Limestone was forced to make cutbacks to public services. Its police department closed in 2023, and there had been near-annual turnover of town managers since the mid-2010s.

== Geography ==
According to the United States Census Bureau, the town has a total area of 40.79 square miles (105.65 km^{2}), of which 40.49 square miles (104.87 km^{2}) is land and 0.30 square miles (0.78 km^{2}) is water.

=== Climate ===
This climatic region is typified by large seasonal temperature differences, with warm to hot (and often humid) summers and cold (sometimes severely cold) winters. According to the Köppen Climate Classification system, Limestone has a humid continental climate, abbreviated "Dfb" on climate maps.

Climate data for Limestone 4 NNW, Maine, 1991–2020 normals, extremes 1950–1970, 2002–present: 737ft (225m)
Month	Jan	Feb	Mar	Apr	May	Jun	Jul	Aug	Sep	Oct	Nov	Dec	Year
Record high °F (°C)	52 (11)	50 (10)	73 (23)	81 (27)	91 (33)	95 (35)	95 (35)	92 (33)	90 (32)	81 (27)	73 (23)	59 (15)	95 (35)
Mean maximum °F (°C)	41.4 (5.2)	40.9 (4.9)	49.4 (9.7)	66.7 (19.3)	82.9 (28.3)	85.2 (29.6)	86.9 (30.5)	85.3 (29.6)	81.3 (27.4)	71.8 (22.1)	59.6 (15.3)	46.9 (8.3)	87.1 (30.6)
Mean daily maximum °F (°C)	19.4 (−7.0)	22.5 (−5.3)	32.8 (0.4)	45.8 (7.7)	61.4 (16.3)	70.2 (21.2)	74.5 (23.6)	73.8 (23.2)	65.7 (18.7)	51.1 (10.6)	38.1 (3.4)	26.4 (−3.1)	48.5 (9.1)
Daily mean °F (°C)	9.4 (−12.6)	11.8 (−11.2)	23.0 (−5.0)	36.5 (2.5)	50.1 (10.1)	59.2 (15.1)	64.3 (17.9)	62.9 (17.2)	54.7 (12.6)	42.3 (5.7)	30.7 (−0.7)	18.0 (−7.8)	38.6 (3.7)
Mean daily minimum °F (°C)	−0.6 (−18.1)	1.1 (−17.2)	13.1 (−10.5)	27.1 (−2.7)	38.8 (3.8)	48.2 (9.0)	54.1 (12.3)	52.1 (11.2)	43.7 (6.5)	33.6 (0.9)	23.3 (−4.8)	9.5 (−12.5)	28.7 (−1.8)
Mean minimum °F (°C)	−22.2 (−30.1)	−21.3 (−29.6)	−11.7 (−24.3)	11.4 (−11.4)	27.1 (−2.7)	36.5 (2.5)	43.1 (6.2)	41.2 (5.1)	30.0 (−1.1)	20.9 (−6.2)	4.9 (−15.1)	−12.2 (−24.6)	−24.7 (−31.5)
Record low °F (°C)	−38 (−39)	−29 (−34)	−25 (−32)	−5 (−21)	20 (−7)	30 (−1)	37 (3)	36 (2)	24 (−4)	12 (−11)	−5 (−21)	−26 (−32)	−38 (−39)
Average precipitation inches (mm)	3.38 (86)	2.62 (67)	3.05 (77)	3.28 (83)	3.66 (93)	3.83 (97)	4.14 (105)	3.92 (100)	3.78 (96)	4.06 (103)	3.52 (89)	3.84 (98)	43.08 (1,094)
Average precipitation days (≥ 0.01 in)	16.5	14.5	14.2	15.0	15.3	15.2	14.7	14.4	11.7	14.2	14.4	18.4	178.5
Source 1: NOAA
Source 2: XMACIS2 (mean maxima/minima 2006–2020)

== Demographics ==
Historical population
Census	Pop.	Note	%±
1860	161		—
1870	263		63.4%
1880	655		149.0%
1890	933		42.4%
1900	1,131		21.2%
1910	1,293		14.3%
1920	1,506		16.5%
1930	1,953		29.7%
1940	1,855		−5.0%
1950	2,427		30.8%
1960	13,102		439.8%
1970	8,745		−33.3%
1980	8,719		−0.3%
1990	9,922		13.8%
2000	2,361		−76.2%
2010	2,314		−2.0%
2020	1,526		−34.1%
U.S. Decennial Census

=== 2010 census ===
As of the census of 2010, there were 2,314 people, 809 households, and 489 families living in the town. The population density was 57.1 inhabitants per square mile (22.0/km^{2}). There were 1,011 housing units at an average density of 25.0 per square mile (9.7/km^{2}). The racial makeup of the town was 89.2% White, 7.0% African American, 1.3% Native American, 0.7% Asian, 0.4% from other races, and 1.4% from two or more races. Hispanic or Latino of any race were 3.8% of the population.

There were 809 households, of which 24.7% had children under the age of 18 living with them, 45.5% were married couples living together, 10.0% had a female householder with no husband present, 4.9% had a male householder with no wife present, and 39.6% were non-families. 32.5% of all households were made up of individuals, and 12.6% had someone living alone who was 65 years of age or older. The average household size was 2.21 and the average family size was 2.74.

The median age in the town was 34.7 years. 22% of residents were under the age of 18; 20.1% were between the ages of 18 and 24; 18.3% were from 25 to 44; 24.6% were from 45 to 64; and 15.1% were 65 years of age or older. The gender makeup of the town was 53.5% male and 46.5% female.

=== 2000 census ===
Languages (2000)	Percent
Spoke English at home	89.41%
Spoke French at home	9.18%
Spoke Spanish at home	1.41%

At the 2000 census, there were 2,361 people, 801 households and 527 families living in the town. The population density was 58.4 inhabitants per square mile (22.5/km^{2}). There were 1,169 housing units at an average density of 28.9 per square mile (11.2/km^{2}). The racial makeup of the town was 90.05% White, 5.08% Black or African American, 0.72% Native American, 1.40% Asian, 0.04% Pacific Islander, 1.06% from other races, and 1.65% from two or more races. Hispanic or Latino of any race were 4.24% of the population.

There were 801 households, of which 28.3% had children under the age of 18 living with them, 52.7% were married couples living together, 9.0% had a female householder with no husband present, and 34.2% were non-families. 30.7% of all households were made up of individuals, and 11.9% had someone living alone who was 65 years of age or older. The average household size was 2.32 and the average family size was 2.86.

Age distribution was 25.7% under the age of 18, 18.0% from 18 to 24, 22.1% from 25 to 44, 22.1% from 45 to 64, and 12.2% who were 65 years of age or older. The median age was 31 years. For every 100 females, there were 112.5 males. For every 100 females age 18 and over, there were 109.9 males.

The median household income was $35,313, and the median family income was $39,135. Males had a median income of $30,579 versus $18,400 for females. The per capita income for the town was $13,502. About 7.7% of families and 20.1% of the population were below the poverty line, including 15.9% of those under age 18 and 12.4% of those age 65 or over.

== Economy ==
=== Military ===
Limestone was home to the former Loring Air Force Base. The base closed in 1994, after which it became known as the site of three large festivals by the Vermont jam band Phish. Tens of thousands of Phish fans poured into the site to temporarily make Limestone the most populous town in Maine during individual weekends of the summers of 1997 (The Great Went), 1998 (Lemonwheel) and 2003 (It).

It is now the Loring Commerce Centre, one of Maine's largest industrial parks.

== Attractions ==
Limestone is home to the Aroostook National Wildlife Refuge.

== Education ==
The school district for this community is Limestone Public Schools, an elementary school district.

The town is home to the Maine School of Science and Mathematics, a residential magnet high school specializing in math and science education, which was ranked #2 in the United States in 2019 by US News. Limestone is also home to the Loring Job Corps Center, located on part of the old Loring Air Force Base.

== Notable people ==
- Steve Bartalo, American football player
- Conrad Keefe Cyr, federal appellate judge
