= Portage Lake, Maine =

Town in Maine, United States

- Town
- Location of Portage Lake, Maine
- Coordinates: 46°46′11″N 68°30′07″W
- Country: United States
- State: Maine
- County: Aroostook
- Villages: Portage; Buffalo

Area
  - Total: 34.56 sq mi (89.51 km^{2})
  - Land: 30.78 sq mi (79.72 km^{2})
  - Water: 3.78 sq mi (9.79 km^{2})
- Elevation: 630 ft (190 m)

Population (2020)
  - Total: 359
  - Density: 12/sq mi (4.5/km^{2})
- Time zone: UTC-5 (Eastern (EST))
  - Summer (DST): UTC-4 (EDT)
- ZIP code: 04768
- Area code: 207
- FIPS code: 23-60300
- GNIS feature ID: 582681
- Website: www.townofportage.org

Portage Lake is a town in Aroostook County, Maine, United States. The population was 359 at the 2020 census.

== Geography ==
According to the United States Census Bureau, the town has a total area of 34.56 square miles (89.51 km^{2}), of which 30.78 square miles (79.72 km^{2}) is land and 3.78 square miles (9.79 km^{2}) is water.

Portage Lake is located along Maine State Route 11, which runs north–south and is the only state road in town. The town is located south of Fort Kent and west of both Caribou and Presque Isle, which are the closest commercial centers.

== Demographics ==
Historical population
Census	Pop.	Note	%±
1870	124		—
1880	132		6.5%
1890	140		6.1%
1900	241		72.1%
1910	500		107.5%
1920	721		44.2%
1930	886		22.9%
1940	773		−12.8%
1950	542		−29.9%
1960	458		−15.5%
1970	477		4.1%
1980	562		17.8%
1990	445		−20.8%
2000	390		−12.4%
2010	391		0.3%
2020	359		−8.2%
U.S. Decennial Census

=== 2010 census ===
As of the census of 2010, there were 391 people, 188 households, and 123 families living in the town. The population density was 12.7 inhabitants per square mile (4.9/km^{2}). There were 511 housing units at an average density of 16.6 per square mile (6.4/km^{2}). The racial makeup of the town was 95.9% White, 0.3% African American, 1.0% Native American, and 2.8% from two or more races.

There were 188 households, of which 17.0% had children under the age of 18 living with them, 57.4% were married couples living together, 5.9% had a female householder with no husband present, 2.1% had a male householder with no wife present, and 34.6% were non-families. 27.7% of all households were made up of individuals, and 12.8% had someone living alone who was 65 years of age or older. The average household size was 2.08 and the average family size was 2.45.

The median age in the town was 56.2 years. 12% of residents were under the age of 18; 3.6% were between the ages of 18 and 24; 15.8% were from 25 to 44; 41.2% were from 45 to 64; and 27.4% were 65 years of age or older. The gender makeup of the town was 50.4% male and 49.6% female.

=== 2000 census ===
As of the census of 2000, there were 390 people, 183 households, and 116 families living in the town. The population density was 12.7 people per square mile (4.9/km^{2}). There were 485 housing units at an average density of 15.8 per square mile (6.1/km^{2}). The racial makeup of the town was 99.74% White, 0.26% from other races. Hispanic or Latino of any race were 0.26% of the population.

There were 183 households, out of which 17.5% had children under the age of 18 living with them, 58.5% were married couples living together, 3.3% had a female householder with no husband present, and 36.1% were non-families. 26.8% of all households were made up of individuals, and 9.3% had someone living alone who was 65 years of age or older. The average household size was 2.11 and the average family size was 2.53.

In the town, the population was spread out, with 14.4% under the age of 18, 3.6% from 18 to 24, 25.1% from 25 to 44, 38.5% from 45 to 64, and 18.5% who were 65 years of age or older. The median age was 48 years. For every 100 females, there were 109.7 males. For every 100 females age 18 and over, there were 104.9 males.

The median income for a household in the town was $32,232, and the median income for a family was $40,000. Males had a median income of $35,104 versus $18,542 for females. The per capita income for the town was $17,983. About 8.2% of families and 9.8% of the population were below the poverty line, including none of those under age 18 and 22.4% of those age 65 or over.

== History ==
The name of the city was borrowed from the name of the lake that occupies much of the center of town. The word portage comes from French and means "to carry". The town was first settled in 1844 by lumbermen from Canada. In 1872, the settlement was organized as a plantation and in 1909 it was incorporated as a town. The Stevens were the founders of Portage.

== Notable person ==
- Lucy Hayward Barker, artist, born in Portage Lake
