= Mapleton, Maine =

Town in Maine, United States

- Town
- Location of Mapleton, Maine
- Coordinates: 46°42′18″N 68°07′50″W
- Country: United States
- State: Maine
- County: Aroostook
- Villages: Mapleton; State Road

Area
  - Total: 34.34 sq mi (88.94 km^{2})
  - Land: 33.97 sq mi (87.98 km^{2})
  - Water: 0.37 sq mi (0.96 km^{2})
- Elevation: 748 ft (228 m)

Population (2020)
  - Total: 1,886
  - Density: 55/sq mi (21.4/km^{2})
- Time zone: UTC-5 (Eastern (EST))
  - Summer (DST): UTC-4 (EDT)
- ZIP code: 04757
- Area code: 207
- FIPS code: 23-43255
- GNIS feature ID: 582579
- Website: mapleton.me

Mapleton is a town in Aroostook County, Maine, United States. The population was 1,886 at the 2020 census.

== Geography ==
According to the United States Census Bureau, the town has a total area of 34.34 square miles (88.94 km^{2}), of which 33.97 square miles (87.98 km^{2}) is land and 0.37 square miles (0.96 km^{2}) is water.

== Demographics ==
Historical population
Census	Pop.	Note	%±
1870	444		—
1880	705		58.8%
1890	832		18.0%
1900	853		2.5%
1910	1,120		31.3%
1920	1,128		0.7%
1930	1,283		13.7%
1940	1,354		5.5%
1950	1,367		1.0%
1960	1,514		10.8%
1970	1,598		5.5%
1980	1,895		18.6%
1990	1,853		−2.2%
2000	1,889		1.9%
2010	1,948		3.1%
2020	1,886		−3.2%
U.S. Decennial Census

=== 2010 census ===
At the 2010 census there were 1,948 people, 816 households, and 578 families living in the town. The population density was 57.3 inhabitants per square mile (22.1/km^{2}). There were 864 housing units at an average density of 25.4 per square mile (9.8/km^{2}). The racial makeup of the town was 98.0% White, 0.2% African American, 0.9% Native American, 0.3% Asian, and 0.6% from two or more races. Hispanic or Latino of any race were 0.3%.

Of the 816 households 28.4% had children under the age of 18 living with them, 60.5% were married couples living together, 7.0% had a female householder with no husband present, 3.3% had a male householder with no wife present, and 29.2% were non-families. 22.9% of households were one person and 8.8% were one person aged 65 or older. The average household size was 2.38 and the average family size was 2.79.

The median age in the town was 43.5 years. 20.6% of residents were under the age of 18; 6.9% were between the ages of 18 and 24; 24.8% were from 25 to 44; 33.2% were from 45 to 64; and 14.5% were 65 or older. The gender makeup of the town was 50.3% male and 49.7% female.

=== 2000 census ===
At the 2000 census there were 1,889 people, 749 households, and 548 families living in the town. The population density was 55.5 inhabitants per square mile (21.4/km^{2}). There were 787 housing units at an average density of 23.1 per square mile (8.9/km^{2}). The racial makeup of the town was 98.31% White, 1.01% Native American, 0.05% Pacific Islander, 0.32% from other races, and 0.32% from two or more races. Hispanic or Latino of any race were 0.48%.

Of the 749 households 32.2% had children under the age of 18 living with them, 65.3% were married couples living together, 4.5% had a female householder with no husband present, and 26.8% were non-families. 20.8% of households were one person and 8.8% were one person aged 65 or older. The average household size was 2.52 and the average family size was 2.91.

The age distribution was 24.2% under the age of 18, 6.6% from 18 to 24, 31.4% from 25 to 44, 25.5% from 45 to 64, and 12.3% 65 or older. The median age was 39 years. For every 100 females, there were 104.9 males. For every 100 females age 18 and over, there were 100.7 males.

The median household income was $36,188 and the median family income was $41,719. Males had a median income of $30,143 versus $22,875 for females. The per capita income for the town was $17,276. About 3.7% of families and 6.2% of the population were below the poverty line, including 6.2% of those under age 18 and 6.2% of those age 65 or over.

== Education ==
The school district for this community is School Administrative District 01.

== Notable person ==
- Alexander Willette, state legislator and Trump administration employee
