= Ashland, Maine =

- Town
- Location of Ashland in Aroostook County, Maine
- Coordinates: 46°38′40″N 68°22′23″W
- Country: United States
- State: Maine
- County: Aroostook

Area
  - Total: 81.54 sq mi (211.19 km^{2})
  - Land: 80.41 sq mi (208.26 km^{2})
  - Water: 1.13 sq mi (2.93 km^{2})
- Elevation: 709 ft (216 m)

Population (2020)
  - Total: 1,202
  - Density: 15/sq mi (5.8/km^{2})
- Time zone: UTC−5 (Eastern Time Zone)
  - Summer (DST): UTC−4 (EDT)
- ZIP Code: 04732
- Area code: 207
- FIPS code: 23-01710
- GNIS feature ID: 582331

Ashland is a town in Aroostook County, Maine, United States. The population was 1,202 at the 2020 census.

== Geography ==
According to the United States Census Bureau, the town has a total area of 81.54 square miles (211.19 km^{2}), of which 80.41 square miles (208.26 km^{2}) is land and 1.13 square miles (2.93 km^{2}) is water. Around Ashland are the smaller towns and townships of Masardis, Oxbow Plantation, Portage, Nashville Plantation, and Garfield Plantation. Most soils in the area have stony silt loam texture and show classic podzol profile development.

== History ==
In the 1830s William Dalton became the first American to establish residency at the site of the future town. The community was organized as a plantation in 1840, at which time there were 40 heads of household listed. It was incorporated as a town in 1862, under the name of Ashland. From 1869 to 1876 the town was renamed "Dalton," but then reverted to its historic and current name. The town grew geographically in size when Sheridan Plantation, which had been organized in 1878 to the north of Ashland, was annexed by Ashland in 1901 to form its present boundaries.

The town of Ashland was located on the nineteenth-century stage route from Patten to Fort Kent. In the nineteenth-century logging was the main industry. The lumber industry was at a peak about 1915, although some continues to the present.

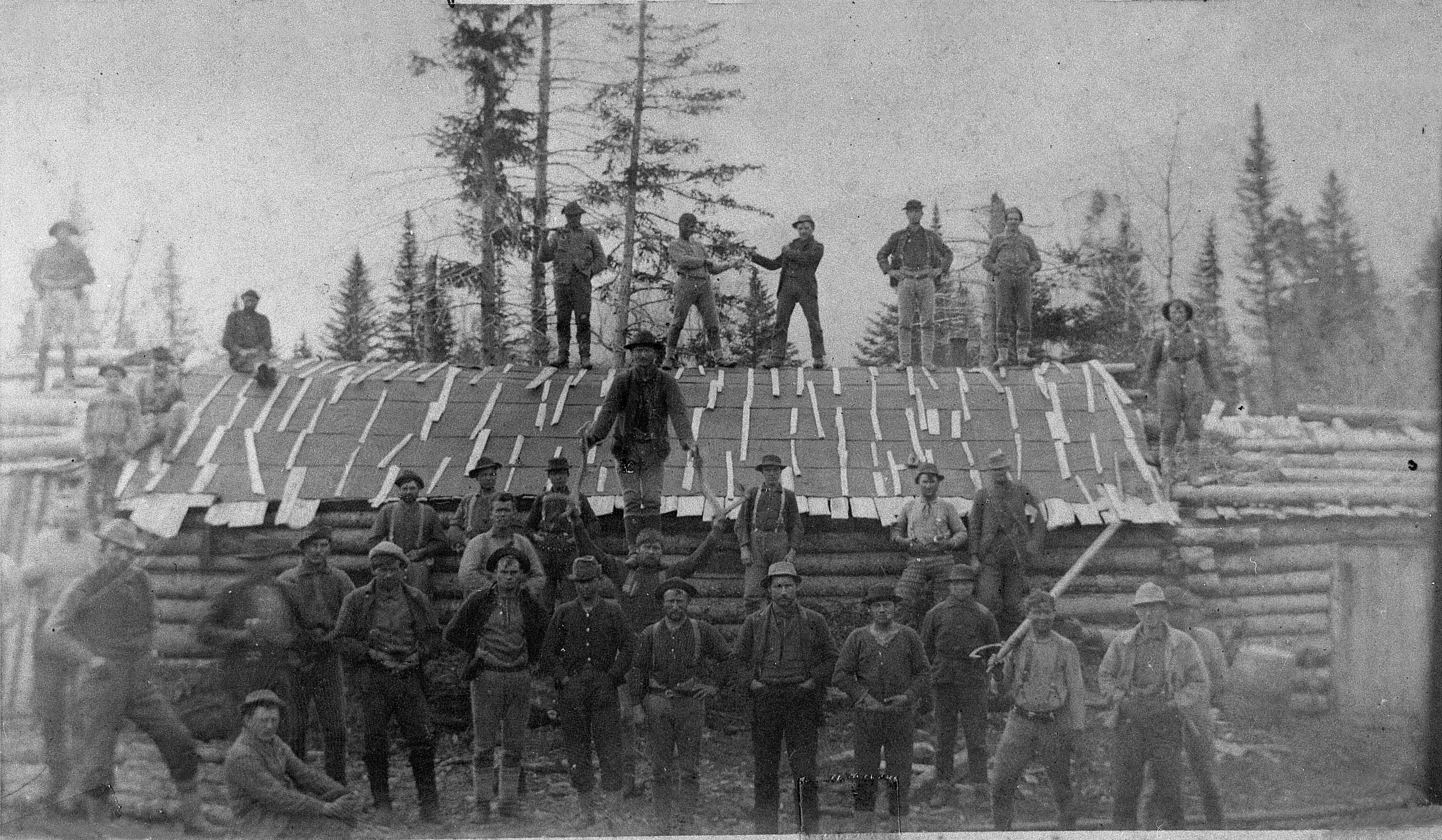
Russell Camp Maine c. 1900

== Demographics ==
Historical population
Census	Pop.	Note	%±
1860	606		—
1870	445		−26.6%
1880	505		13.5%
1890	568		12.5%
1900	1,080		90.1%
1910	2,173		101.2%
1920	2,391		10.0%
1930	2,198		−8.1%
1940	2,457		11.8%
1950	2,370		−3.5%
1960	1,980		−16.5%
1970	1,761		−11.1%
1980	1,865		5.9%
1990	1,542		−17.3%
2000	1,474		−4.4%
2010	1,302		−11.7%
2020	1,202		−7.7%
U.S. Decennial Census

=== 2010 census ===
At the 2010 census, there were 1,302 people, 603 households and 355 families living in the town. The population density was 16.2 per square mile (6.3/km^{2}). There were 733 housing units at an average density of 9.1 per square mile (3.5/km^{2}). The racial makeup of the town was 98.6% White, 0.7% African American, 0.2% Native American, 0.3% Asian, and 0.2% from two or more races. Hispanic or Latino of any race were 0.6% of the population.

There were 603 households, of which 23.9% had children under the age of 18 living with them, 46.4% were married couples living together, 6.6% had a female householder with no husband present, 5.8% had a male householder with no wife present, and 41.1% were non-families. 34.5% of all households were made up of individuals, and 17.5% had someone living alone who was 65 years of age or older. The average household size was 2.16 and the average family size was 2.74.

The median age in the town was 45.2 years. 19.7% of residents were under the age of 18; 7% were between the ages of 18 and 24; 23.2% were from 25 to 44; 29.3% were from 45 to 64; and 20.9% were 65 years of age or older. The gender makeup of the town was 50.8% male and 49.2% female.

=== 2000 census ===
At the 2000 census, there were 1,474 people, 629 households and 398 families living in the town. The population density was 18.3 per square mile (7.1/km^{2}). There were 760 housing units at an average density of 9.4 per square mile (3.6/km^{2}). The racial makeup of the town was 98.78% White, 0.88% Native American, 0.20% Asian and 0.14% from two or more races. Hispanic or Latino of any race were 0.07% of the population.

There were 629 households, of which 27.5% had children under the age of 18 living with them, 54.2% were married couples living together, 5.4% had a female householder with no husband present, and 36.6% were non-families. 30.0% of all households were made up of individuals, and 13.2% had someone living alone who was 65 years of age or older. The average household size was 2.34 and the average family size was 2.90.

23.7% of the population were under the age of 18, 6.0% from 18 to 24, 29.1% from 25 to 44, 25.6% from 45 to 64, and 15.6% who were 65 years of age or older. The median age was 40 years. For every 100 females, there were 104.4 males. For every 100 females age 18 and over, there were 101.3 males.

The median household income was $33,472 and the median family income was $40,185. Males had a median income of $32,768 and females $21,027. The per capita income was $15,328. About 6.1% of families and 9.7% of the population were below the poverty line, including 7.4% of those under age 18 and 15.2% of those age 65 or over.

== Education ==
The town was served by Ashland Community High School for grades 7–12 and the Ashland Central School for grades K–6. In 2010 construction was completed and the new consolidated Ashland District School, next to the former high school, was opened for grades K–12. The building that housed Ashland Community High School for nearly 50 years was demolished that year to make way for new athletic fields.
