= Eagle Lake, Maine =

Town in Maine, United States

Eagle Lake Lac Aigle
- Town
- Location of Eagle Lake, Maine
- Coordinates: 47°03′28″N 68°36′43″W
- Country: United States
- State: Maine
- County: Aroostook
- Villages: Eagle Lake; Plaisted

Area
  - Total: 4.26 sq mi (11.04 km^{2})
  - Land: 3.95 sq mi (10.24 km^{2})
  - Water: 0.31 sq mi (0.80 km^{2})
- Elevation: 1,079 ft (329 m)

Population (2020)
  - Total: 553
  - Density: 139.8/sq mi (53.99/km^{2})
- Time zone: UTC-5 (Eastern (EST))
  - Summer (DST): UTC-4 (EDT)
- ZIP code: 04739
- Area code: 207
- FIPS code: 23-19420
- GNIS feature ID: 582451
- Website: www.townofeaglelake.org

Eagle Lake (French: Lac Aigle) is a town in Aroostook County, Maine, United States. The population was 772 at the 2020 census. The town was named by a body of troops heading from Bangor to the Aroostook War for the many eagles that they saw around the lake. A total of 49.0% of the population speaks French, reflecting a trend in Northeastern Maine.

== Geography ==
According to the United States Census Bureau, the town has a total area of 39.48 square miles (102.25 km^{2}), of which 37.36 square miles (96.76 km^{2}) is land and 2.12 square miles (5.49 km^{2}) is water.

== Demographics ==
Historical population
Census	Pop.	Note	%±
1870	143		—
1880	233		62.9%
1890	313		34.3%
1900	406		29.7%
1910	1,421		250.0%
1920	1,772		24.7%
1930	1,780		0.5%
1940	1,891		6.2%
1950	1,516		−19.8%
1960	1,138		−24.9%
1970	908		−20.2%
1980	1,019		12.2%
1990	942		−7.6%
2000	815		−13.5%
2010	864		6.0%
2020	772		−10.6%
U.S. Decennial Census

=== 2010 census ===
As of the census of 2010, there were 864 people, 378 households, and 221 families living in the town. The population density was 23.1 inhabitants per square mile (8.9/km^{2}). There were 667 housing units at an average density of 17.9 units per square mile (6.9 units/km^{2}). The racial makeup of the town was 97.2% White, 1.3% Native American, 0.1% Pacific Islander, 0.1% from other races, and 1.3% from two or more races. Hispanic or Latino of any race were 0.7% of the population.

There were 378 households, of which 20.1% had children under the age of 18 living with them, 46.0% were married couples living together, 5.6% had a female householder with no husband present, 6.9% had a male householder with no wife present, and 41.5% were non-families. 36.8% of all households were made up of individuals, and 19.5% had someone living alone who was 65 years of age or older. The average household size was 2.08 and the average family size was 2.69.

The median age in the town was 52.7 years. 15.6% of residents were under the age of 18; 4.8% were between the ages of 18 and 24; 18.2% were from 25 to 44; 32.9% were from 45 to 64; and 28.5% were 65 years of age or older. The gender makeup of the town was 49.9% male and 50.1% female.

=== 2000 census ===
As of the census of 2000, there were 815 people, 330 households, and 203 families living in the town. The population density was 21.9 inhabitants per square mile (8.5/km^{2}). There were 599 housing units at an average density of 16.1 units per square mile (6.2 units/km^{2}). The racial makeup of the town was 98.65% White, 0.12% Native American, 0.74% Asian, and 0.49% from two or more races. Hispanic or Latino of any race were 0.12% of the population.

There were 330 households, out of which 25.8% had children under the age of 18 living with them, 46.7% were married couples living together, 10.3% had a female householder with no husband present, and 38.2% were non-families. 32.4% of all households were made up of individuals, and 17.6% had someone living alone who was 65 years of age or older. The average household size was 2.21 and the average family size was 2.77.

In the town, the population was spread out, with 17.5% under the age of 18, 7.9% from 18 to 24, 24.5% from 25 to 44, 28.0% from 45 to 64, and 22.1% who were 65 years of age or older. The median age was 45 years. For every 100 females, there were 94.5 males. For every 100 females age 18 and over, there were 90.4 males.

The median income for a household in the town was $22,159, and the median income for a family was $34,375. Males had a median income of $30,956 versus $17,917 for females. The per capita income for the town was $14,315. About 11.4% of families and 21.9% of the population were below the poverty line, including 17.4% of those under age 18 and 40.5% of those age 65 or over.

== Notable person ==
- John Martin, state representative, former speaker of the Maine House of Representatives
