= Aroostook County, Maine =

County in Maine, United States

- County
- Aroostook County Courthouse

- Flag Seal

- Location within the U.S. state of Maine
- Coordinates: 46.65°N 68.59°W
- Country: United States
- State: Maine
- Founded: May 1, 1839
- Named for: Miꞌkmaq word meaning "beautiful water"
- Seat: Houlton
- Largest city: Presque Isle

Area
  - Total: 6,828 sq mi (17,680 km^{2})
  - Land: 6,671 sq mi (17,280 km^{2})
  - Water: 156 sq mi (400 km^{2}) 2.3%

Population (2020)
  - Total: 67,105
  - Estimate (2025): 66,609 ▼
  - Density: 10.06/sq mi (3.884/km^{2})
- Time zone: UTC−5 (Eastern)
  - Summer (DST): UTC−4 (EDT)
- Congressional district: 2nd
- Website: aroostook.me.us

Aroostook County (/əˈruːstək, -ˈrʊs-/ ə-ROO-stək, -RUU-; French: Comté d'Aroostook) is the northernmost county in the U.S. state of Maine, located along the Canada–United States border. As of the 2020 census, the population was 67,105. The county seat is Houlton, with offices in Caribou and Fort Kent.

Known in Maine as "The County", it is the largest county in Maine by total area, the second-largest in the United States east of the Mississippi River by total area (behind St. Louis County, Minnesota), and the 31st-largest county in the entire contiguous U.S. With over 6,800 square miles (18,000 km^{2}) of land, it is larger than the three smallest U.S. states. The state's northernmost village, Estcourt Station, is also the northernmost community in the New England region and in the contiguous United States east of the Great Lakes.

Aroostook County is known for its potato cultivation, and it is an emerging hub for wind power. Historically, Acadian culture and heritage is well-represented in the county. In the Saint John Valley (northern Aroostook County), which borders Madawaska County, New Brunswick, many of the residents are bilingual in English and Acadian French. Elsewhere in Maine, New England French is the predominant form of French spoken. Additionally, the original inhabitants of the area, the Wolastoqiyik, still remain in their country (Wolastokuk) as the Houlton Band of Metaksonekiyak Wolastoqewiyik.

Aroostook County forms the entirety of the Presque Isle media market, according to Nielsen Media Research.

== Etymology ==
The name Aroostook comes from the Wolastoqey (or Maliseet) word Wolastoq or "Woolahstook", which means "beautiful river", referring to the Saint John River.

== History ==
Named for the Wolastoq River, Aroostook's bounds fall completely within Wolastoqey Country, natively called Wolastokuk. Confederated with neighboring nations like the Mi'kmaq and Abenaki, the Wolastoqiyik (or Maliseet) Nation and their country comprised and still comprises one part of the Wabanaki Confederacy. This confederation covering several countries across Dawnland (what is now New England and the Canadian Maritimes) came together and confederated during the European and British colonization of the Americas.

The sparsely populated North Maine Woods, roughly defined as the headwaters of the Saint John, Penobscot and Kennebec Rivers, was populated during the colonial era by refugees fleeing oppressive governments. Native Americans, particularly Dawnlanders, (retreating from hostile European colonists, and smugglers trading with them, and between English Massachusetts and French Acadia) lived in small communities along the Atlantic coast on the disputed border between those colonies. As England dominated the Gulf of Maine following the French and Indian Wars, these occupants of the border region retreated up the large rivers into the interior, joined by Acadians escaping the Acadian Expulsion. Most Acadians and Wolastoqewiyik found refuge in Canada's Madawaska county, but several communities stayed in what would become the United States, including the Houlton Band of Maliseet Indians, also known as the Metaksonekiyak Wolastoqewiyik. Although the survivors might have preferred to remain independent, surrounding governments dividing their refuge, considering Aroostook County as the west bank of the Saint John River drainage basin upstream of Canada. Under United States control, the area was initially dominated by lumber manufacturing interests, although agriculture became important as population increased. Transportation along the Saint John River, and early rail connections into New Brunswick, created strong business ties with Canada, until the county was connected to the United States rail network by the Bangor and Aroostook Railroad in 1894. Aroostook County residents retain an independent cultural identity established during their history of isolation on the border frontier.

Aroostook County was formed, in 1839, from parts of Penobscot and Washington counties. Between 1843 and 1844, the county gained more land from Penobscot County, and further exchanged land with Piscataquis County. In 1889, Aroostook gained a small amount of Penobscot land, subsequently giving it back in 1903, when Aroostook County took on its current form. Some of the territory in the county was part of the land dispute that led to the "Aroostook War", a dispute which would be settled by the Webster–Ashburton Treaty.

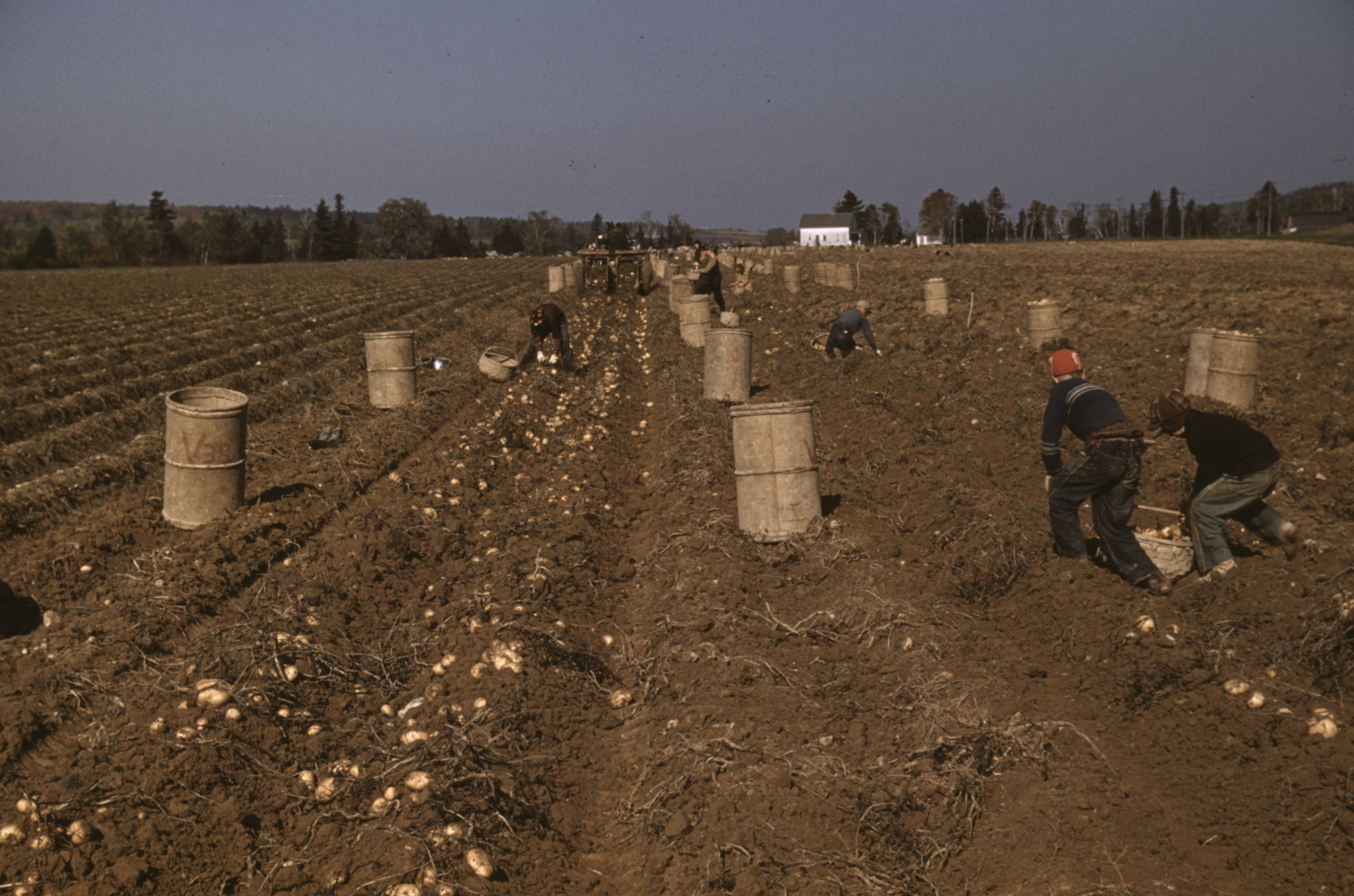
Children gathering potatoes on a large farm in Aroostook County, 1940. Schools did not open until the potatoes were harvested. Photo by Jack Delano.

The county was also part of a route on the Underground Railroad, and was one of the last stops before entering Canada. Slaves would meet and hide just outside Aroostook or in deserted areas. Friends Quaker Church near Fort Fairfield was often a final stop.

Much of Aroostook County's economy was dominated by military spending through the Cold War. Limestone Army Air Field was built in Limestone, Maine, in 1947. It was renamed Loring Air Force Base (AFB) in 1953 as the home of the Strategic Air Command (SAC) 42d Bombardment Wing operating Convair B-36 Peacemaker bombers. Aroostook County was chosen due to its strategic location as the closest point in the Continental United States to the Middle East and Europe including the Soviet Union west of the Ural Mountains. Loring AFB could accommodate one hundred of these large bombers; and had both the largest fuel storage capacity, at 9,200,000 US gallons (35,000,000 L), and the largest weapons storage capacity, at 4700 tonnes NEW, of any SAC base. The 42d Bombardment Wing at Loring operated Boeing B-52 Stratofortress bombers until the 1991 Base Realignment and Closure Commission recommended closure and the base closed in 1994.

The 2014 Acadian World Congress was held along the Canada–United States border, co-hosted by Aroostook County and a number of neighboring counties in Canada (Témiscouata in Quebec, and Victoria, Madawaska and Restigouche in New Brunswick). Organizers planned a Tintamarre that was held in the town of Madawaska, Maine, as well as a giant tug of war across the Saint John River.

== Geography ==
According to the U.S. Census Bureau, the county has a total area of 6,828 square miles (17,680 km^{2}), of which 6,671 square miles (17,280 km^{2}) is land and 156 square miles (400 km^{2}) (2.3%) is water. Aroostook County is Maine's largest county by area, about the size of Connecticut and Rhode Island combined. The county high point is Peaked Mountain, elevation 2,230 feet (680 m), whose western slopes are in the north east corner of Piscataquis County.

=== Adjacent counties and municipalities ===
- Washington County – southeast
- Penobscot County – south
- Piscataquis County – south
- Somerset County – southwest
- Montmagny Regional County Municipality, Quebec – west
- L'Islet Regional County Municipality, Quebec – west
- Kamouraska Regional County Municipality, Quebec – northwest
- Témiscouata Regional County Municipality, Quebec – north
- Madawaska County, New Brunswick – northeast
- Victoria County, New Brunswick – east
- Carleton County, New Brunswick – east
- York County, New Brunswick – southeast

=== National protected area ===
- Aroostook National Wildlife Refuge
- Aroostook State Park

=== Major highways ===
- I-95
- US 1
- US 1A
- US 2
- US 2A
- SR 10
- SR 11
- SR 89
- SR 157
- SR 158
- SR 161
- SR 161B
- SR 164
- SR 167
- SR 171

== Government and politics ==
Although the county is more socially conservative than Maine's southern and coastal counties, it was won by the Democratic presidential candidate in the six elections from 1992 to 2012 before going for Republican Donald Trump in 2016, 2020 and 2024. In the Maine Legislature, the county's delegation in 2013 included three Democrats and seven Republicans. In 2009, it voted 73% in favor of a referendum rejecting same-sex marriage and 54% against the Maine Medical Marijuana Act. In 2012, it voted 67% against a measure to legalize same-sex marriage in Maine.

=== Voter registration ===
Voter registration and party enrollment as of March 2024
Republican	15,642	37.45%
Unenrolled	12,116	29.01%
Democratic	11,694	28%
Green Independent	1,754	4.2%
No Labels	343	0.82%
Libertarian	216	0.52%
Total	41,765	100%

United States presidential election results for Aroostook County, Maine
Year	Republican / Whig		Democratic		Third party(ies)	
Year	No.	%	No.	%	No.	%
1840	289	37.58%	480	62.42%	0	0.00%
1844	398	29.95%	907	68.25%	24	1.81%
1848	431	30.68%	868	61.78%	106	7.54%
1852	724	45.51%	787	49.47%	80	5.03%
1856	837	51.04%	795	48.48%	8	0.49%
1860	1,142	66.01%	414	23.93%	174	10.06%
1864	1,059	60.93%	679	39.07%	0	0.00%
1868	1,706	72.66%	642	27.34%	0	0.00%
1872	1,757	78.58%	479	21.42%	0	0.00%
1876	1,839	59.30%	1,262	40.70%	0	0.00%
1880	2,560	47.81%	2,738	51.14%	56	1.05%
1884	3,028	53.62%	2,192	38.82%	427	7.56%
1888	3,365	60.73%	1,808	32.63%	368	6.64%
1892	2,893	54.18%	1,917	35.90%	530	9.93%
1896	4,816	74.47%	1,383	21.39%	268	4.14%
1900	4,192	76.07%	1,030	18.69%	289	5.24%
1904	4,681	83.19%	736	13.08%	210	3.73%
1908	4,783	77.56%	1,157	18.76%	227	3.68%
1912	898	11.49%	1,924	24.63%	4,991	63.88%
1916	5,770	69.58%	2,425	29.24%	98	1.18%
1920	11,191	88.48%	1,407	11.12%	50	0.40%
1924	9,554	81.61%	1,510	12.90%	643	5.49%
1928	14,545	71.45%	5,771	28.35%	41	0.20%
1932	14,054	59.47%	9,409	39.82%	168	0.71%
1936	14,708	64.69%	7,704	33.88%	324	1.43%
1940	13,888	58.34%	9,877	41.49%	39	0.16%
1944	11,678	59.23%	8,017	40.66%	22	0.11%
1948	9,459	56.51%	7,183	42.91%	98	0.59%
1952	16,851	68.85%	7,561	30.89%	64	0.26%
1956	16,001	72.44%	6,089	27.56%	0	0.00%
1960	18,698	55.82%	14,799	44.18%	0	0.00%
1964	9,994	36.28%	17,552	63.71%	3	0.01%
1968	13,919	47.61%	15,044	51.46%	273	0.93%
1972	19,051	62.37%	11,474	37.56%	22	0.07%
1976	15,550	48.52%	15,484	48.31%	1,017	3.17%
1980	16,343	48.29%	14,492	42.82%	3,011	8.90%
1984	21,837	63.59%	12,348	35.96%	153	0.45%
1988	17,213	53.38%	14,850	46.05%	183	0.57%
1992	12,409	32.16%	15,682	40.64%	10,494	27.20%
1996	10,400	29.89%	18,022	51.80%	6,370	18.31%
2000	16,555	47.11%	17,196	48.93%	1,392	3.96%
2004	17,564	46.55%	19,569	51.86%	600	1.59%
2008	15,898	44.17%	19,345	53.75%	751	2.09%
2012	15,196	44.88%	17,777	52.50%	887	2.62%
2016	19,419	55.33%	13,386	38.14%	2,292	6.53%
2020	21,113	59.06%	13,956	39.04%	677	1.89%
2024	22,246	62.40%	12,900	36.18%	507	1.42%

== Demographics ==
Historical population
Census	Pop.	Note	%±
1840	9,413		—
1850	12,529		33.1%
1860	22,479		79.4%
1870	29,609		31.7%
1880	41,700		40.8%
1890	49,589		18.9%
1900	60,744		22.5%
1910	74,664		22.9%
1920	81,728		9.5%
1930	87,843		7.5%
1940	94,436		7.5%
1950	96,039		1.7%
1960	106,064		10.4%
1970	92,463		−12.8%
1980	91,331		−1.2%
1990	86,936		−4.8%
2000	73,938		−15.0%
2010	71,870		−2.8%
2020	67,105		−6.6%
2025 (est.)	66,609	▼	−0.7%
U.S. Decennial Census; 1790–1960 1900–1990; 1990–2000 2010–2016

=== 2020 census ===
Aroostook County, Maine – Racial composition
Race (NH = Non-Hispanic)	2020	2010	2000	1990	1980
White alone (NH)	92.6% (62,163)	95.1% (68,341)	96.4% (71,309)	96.9% (84,269)	97.2% (88,801)
Black alone (NH)	0.6% (423)	0.6% (430)	0.4% (269)	1% (909)	1% (884)
American Indian alone (NH)	1.8% (1,206)	1.7% (1,195)	1.3% (993)	0.9% (790)	0.6% (587)
Asian alone (NH)	0.6% (392)	0.4% (310)	0.5% (342)	0.5% (395)	0.5% (434)
Pacific Islander alone (NH)	0% (18)	0% (11)	0% (16)		
Other race alone (NH)	0.2% (131)	0% (14)	0% (32)	0% (19)	0.1% (79)
Multiracial (NH)	2.8% (1,860)	1.3% (902)	0.7% (536)	—	—
Hispanic/Latino (any race)	1.4% (912)	0.9% (667)	0.6% (441)	0.6% (554)	0.6% (546)

As of the 2020 census, there were 67,105 people, 29,784 households, and 38,303 housing units.

Of the residents, 19.0% were under the age of 18 and 25.3% were 65 years of age or older; the median age was 48.9 years. For every 100 females there were 97.5 males, and for every 100 females age 18 and over there were 95.4 males. 14.4% of residents lived in urban areas and 85.6% lived in rural areas.

There were 29,784 households in the county, of which 22.5% had children under the age of 18 living with them and 25.7% had a female householder with no spouse or partner present. About 33.5% of all households were made up of individuals and 16.7% had someone living alone who was 65 years of age or older.

There were 38,303 housing units, of which 22.2% were vacant. Among occupied units, 70.9% were owner-occupied and 29.1% were renter-occupied, with a homeowner vacancy rate of 3.0% and a rental vacancy rate of 9.8%.

The racial makeup of the county was 93.2% White, 0.7% Black or African American, 1.8% American Indian and Alaska Native, 0.6% Asian, 0.0% Native Hawaiian and Pacific Islander, 0.4% from some other race, and 3.3% from two or more races. Hispanic or Latino residents of any race comprised 1.4% of the population.

The most commonly reported ancestries were English (28.4%), French (15.3%), Irish (11.8%), German (4.4%), Scottish (3.3%), and French Canadian (2.6%).

=== 2010 census ===
As of the 2010 United States census, there were 71,870 people, 30,961 households, and 19,578 families residing in the county. The population density was 10.8 inhabitants per square mile (4.2/km^{2}). There were 39,529 housing units at an average density of 5.9 per square mile (2.3/km^{2}). The racial makeup of the county was 95.7% White, 1.7% Native American, 0.6% Black or African American, 0.4% Asian, 0.2% from other races, and 1.4% from two or more races. Those of Hispanic or Latino origin made up 0.9% of the population. In terms of ancestry, 27.2% were of French origin, 18.1% English, 17.4% Irish, 8.2% French Canadian (counted separately from French), 8.1% American, and 5.2% of German heritage.

In 2010, 18.0% of the population reported speaking French at home; other than speakers of English, there were no other significant linguistic groups.

Of the 30,961 households, 25.5% had children under the age of 18 living with them, 49.6% were married couples living together, 9.4% had a female householder with no husband present, 36.8% were non-families, and 30.8% of all households were made up of individuals. The average household size was 2.26 and the average family size was 2.79. The median age was 45.3 years.

The median income for a household in the county was $36,574 and the median income for a family was $47,114. Males had a median income of $37,222 versus $28,244 for females. The per capita income for the county was $20,251. About 10.6% of families and 15.4% of the population were below the poverty line, including 20.4% of those under age 18 and 11.7% of those age 65 or over.

=== 2000 census ===
As of the census of 2000, there were 73,938 people, 30,356 households, and 20,429 families residing in the county. The population density was 11 people per square mile (4.2 people/km^{2}). There were 38,719 housing units at an average density of 6 per square mile (2.3/km^{2}). The racial makeup of the county was 96.80% White, 0.38% Black or African American, 1.36% Native American, 0.47% Asian, 0.03% Pacific Islander, 0.17% from other races, and 0.80% from two or more races. 0.60% of the population were Hispanic or Latino of any race. 22.6% were of French, 15.4% United States or American, 14.6% English, 14.3% French Canadian and 10.2% Irish ancestry.

There were 30,356 households, out of which 28.40% had children under the age of 18 living with them, 55.60% were married couples living together, 8.10% had a female householder with no husband present, and 32.70% were non-families. 27.60% of all households were made up of individuals, and 13.10% had someone living alone who was 65 years of age or older. The average household size was 2.36 and the average family size was 2.86.

In the county, 22.60% of the population was under the age of 18, 7.90% was from 18 to 24, 26.30% from 25 to 44, 26.20% from 45 to 64, and 17.00% was 65 years of age or older. The median age was 41 years. For every 100 females there were 95.40 males. For every 100 females age 18 and over, there were 92.70 males.

The median income for a household in the county was $28,837, and the median income for a family was $36,044. Males had a median income of $29,747 versus $20,300 for females. The per capita income for the county was $15,033. About 9.80% of families and 14.30% of the population were below the poverty line, including 16.20% of those under age 18 and 16.00% of those age 65 or over.

== Communities ==
=== Cities ===
- Caribou
- Presque Isle

=== Incorporated towns ===
- Allagash
- Amity
- Ashland
- Blaine
- Bridgewater
- Castle Hill
- Caswell
- Chapman
- Crystal
- Dyer Brook
- Eagle Lake
- Easton
- Fort Fairfield
- Fort Kent
- Frenchville
- Grand Isle
- Hamlin
- Hammond
- Haynesville
- Hersey
- Hodgdon
- Houlton
- Island Falls
- Limestone
- Linneus
- Littleton
- Ludlow
- Madawaska
- Mapleton
- Mars Hill
- Masardis
- Merrill
- Monticello
- New Canada
- New Limerick
- New Sweden
- Oakfield
- Orient
- Perham
- Portage Lake
- Saint Agatha
- Saint Francis
- Sherman
- Smyrna
- Stockholm
- Van Buren
- Wade
- Wallagrass
- Washburn
- Westfield
- Westmanland
- Weston
- Woodland

=== Plantations ===
- Cyr Plantation
- Garfield Plantation
- Glenwood Plantation
- Macwahoc Plantation
- Moro Plantation
- Nashville Plantation
- Reed Plantation
- Saint John Plantation
- Winterville Plantation

=== Census-designated places ===
- Ashland
- Blaine
- Eagle Lake
- Fort Fairfield
- Fort Kent
- Grand Isle
- Houlton
- Island Falls
- Limestone
- Madawaska
- Mapleton
- Mars Hill
- Oakfield
- Patten
- Van Buren
- Washburn

=== Unincorporated communities within towns ===
- California
- Clayton Lake
- Crouseville
- Daigle
- Estcourt Station
- Fort Kent Mills
- Portage
- Saint David
- Sinclair
- Smyrna Mills
- Wytopitlock

=== Unorganized territories ===
- Bancroft (formerly a town)
- Cary
- Central Aroostook
- Connor
- Northwest Aroostook
- Oxbow
- Sinclair
- South Aroostook
- Square Lake

=== Indian reservations ===
- Aroostook Band of Mi'kmaq Indians Reservation, located in Presque Isle
- Houlton Band of Maliseet Indians Reservation, located in Houlton

== Education ==
K-12 school districts include the following:

- Bridgewater School District
- Caswell School District
- Eagle Lake Public Schools
- Easton School District
- Glenwood Plantation School District
- Grand Isle School District
- Macwahoc Plantation School District
- Madawaska School District
- Moro Plantation Public Schools
- Nashville Plantation School District
- New Sweden School District
- Orient School District
- Reed Plantation School District
- Westmanland School District
- Winterville Plantation Public Schools
- Woodland School District
- School Administrative District 01
- School Administration District 10
- School Administrative District 14
- School Administrative District 20
- School Administrative District 24
- School Administrative District 27
- School Administrative District 29
- School Administrative District 32
- School Administrative District 33
- School Administrative District 42
- School Administrative District 45
- School Administrative District 70
- Regional School Unit 39
- Regional School Unit 50
- Regional School Unit 89

There is also a single elementary school district, Limestone Public Schools.

There is also the Aroostook Unorganized Territory, which is not in any municipality. The Maine Department of Education takes responsibility for coordinating school assignments in the unorganized territories. The department operates one school, Connor Consolidated School, in Connor Township. It previously operated another school in the unorganized territory, Patrick Therriault School in Sinclair Township.

When Bancroft was a town, it was under the Bancroft School District. When Oxbow was a plantation, it was directly under the School Administrative District 32.

The University of Maine at Fort Kent, University of Maine at Presque Isle, and Northern Maine Community College are based in Aroostook County, as was the former Ricker College.

== See also ==
- National Register of Historic Places listings in Aroostook County, Maine
