= Maine School Administrative District 1 =

Public school district in Aroostook County, Maine, US

Address
- 79 Blake St Suite #1 Presque Isle, Maine, 04769; United States
- Coordinates: 46°39′N 68°04′W

District information
- Grades: PK–12
- Schools: 6
- NCES District ID: 2310860
- District ID: ME-551

Students and staff
- Students: 1,687 (2021–22)
- Teachers: 125.51 (FTE)
- Student–teacher ratio: 13.44

Other information
- Website: sad1.org

Maine School Administrative District 1 (MSAD 1) is an operating school district in the U.S. state of Maine, covering the towns of Castle Hill, Chapman, Mapleton, Presque Isle and Westfield.

== Schools ==
=== High schools ===
- Presque Isle High School (9-12)
- Presque Isle Tech Center

=== Middle schools ===
- Presque Isle Middle School (7-8)

=== Elementary schools ===
- Mapleton Elementary School (PK-5)
- Pine Street Elementary School (PK-1)
- Skyway Elementary School (2-6)
