= Kevin St. Jarre =

American teacher and novelist (born 1968)

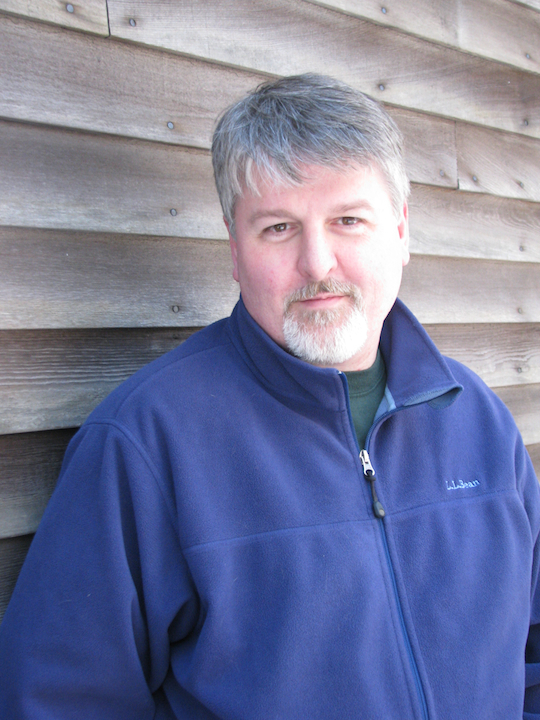
- St. Jarre in April 2011
- Born: July 26, 1968 (age 58); Pittsfield, Massachusetts, US
- Education: BS, UMaine Fort Kent (1997); MFA, U Southern Maine (2010)
- Occupations: Soldier; teacher; writer
- Writing career
- Pen name: Michael Hawke
- Genres: Historical fiction; sci-fi; thriller
- Military career
- Branch: United States Army
- Years: 1986–1992
- Unit: 1st Armored Division
- Conflicts: Operation Desert Storm

Kevin St. Jarre (born July 26, 1968) is an American teacher, author, and former soldier.

== Personal life ==
Son of Cecile and Guy St. Jarre, Kevin St. Jarre was born on July 26, 1968 in Pittsfield, Massachusetts. He grew up in Madawaska, Maine, and graduated from Madawaska High School in 1986, where he was president of the chess club and wanted to work in military intelligence. St. Jarre earned his Bachelor of Science from the University of Maine at Fort Kent in 1997; his 2010 Master of Fine Arts from the University of Southern Maine was a product of the Stonecoast MFA Program in Creative Writing. As of August 2023, he was a resident of Cape Elizabeth, Maine.

== Career ==
St. Jarre served in the United States Army from 1986–1992, working in military intelligence with the 1st Armored Division during Operation Desert Storm. After his enlistment, he was elected to the Madawaska, Maine board of selectmen as well as town manager of Grand Isle, Maine. From 1998, he worked for Aprisma Management Technologies at the corporate level.

=== Education ===
Since 1997 through at least 2020, St. Jarre has been teaching, either at universities or high schools, including at Caribou High School (1997–1998), Noble High School (2003–2005), Fort Kent Community High School (2005–2010), Massabesic High School (2010–2014), University of Maine at Farmington (2013–2016), and Cape Elizabeth High School (2014 – at least 2020).

=== Writing ===
A writer since childhood, St. Jarre's first sale was to his father for ten cents. St. Jarre has typically been a writer of historical fiction and thrillers.

In 2005–2006, he published a three-volume series of military-thriller novels with characters based on his friends and coworkers: Night Stalkers, Night Stalkers: Coercion, and Night Stalkers: Homefront were respectively released in January 2005, July 2005, and January 2006. St. Jarre used the pen name Michael Hawke because he didn't want to be typecast by that type of fiction.

His novel Aliens, Drywall, and a Unicycle, published on November 6, 2020, is a character piece about a New Hampshirite divorcé and the unusual people he meets in his new apartment building. St. Jarre's next book, Celestine, was a science-fiction novel released in 2021. That same year, he published The Twin, followed by Absence of Grace and The Book of Emmaus in 2022. In August 2023, his most-recent book was Paris, California, a novel about when community displacement "goes completely off the rails."
