= Alexander Willette =

American politician

Alexander R. Willette
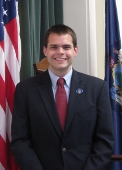

Member of the Maine House of Representatives from the 7th district
- In office December 2010 – September 4, 2014
- Preceded by: Patricia Sutherland
- Succeeded by: Robert Foley

Personal details
- Born: Alexander Reginald Willette; April 2, 1989 (age 37) Presque Isle, Maine
- Party: Republican
- Spouse: Melissa Lacroix
- Education: University of Maine at Farmington (B.A.); University of Maine School of Law (J.D.)
- Profession: Real estate broker, Attorney, Army Officer

Military service
- Branch/service: United States Army; Maine Army National Guard
- Years of service: 2017–present
- Rank: Captain
- Unit: 120th Regional Support Group

Alexander Reginald Willette (born April 2, 1989) is an American politician from Maine. In 2010, the Republican Willette was elected to represent District 7 in the Maine House of Representatives, covering much of central Aroostook County including part of the city of Presque Isle. He served as the Assistant Republican Leader, and, during his time in the Legislature, was both the youngest member of legislative leadership in Maine's history and the youngest in the United States.

== Early life and education ==
Willette was born in Presque Isle, Maine and lives in Mapleton. A graduate of Presque Isle High School, Willette earned a B.A. in political science from the University of Maine at Farmington in May 2011. He has a Juris Doctor degree from the University of Maine School of Law.

== Career ==
=== Maine House of Representatives ===
==== Elections ====
In 2010, Willette decided to run for Maine's 7th House district, based in Aroostook County. He was the Republican nominee and defeated Democratic nominee Troy Haines 54%-46%. Willette thus became the youngest person to ever win an election for the Maine House of Representatives. In 2012, he won re-election to a second term, defeating Haines again, 52%-48%.

==== Tenure ====
The district includes 10 towns: Castle Hill, Chapman, Hammond, Littleton, Mapleton, Masardis, Monticello, Wade, Washburn, and Oxbow. In addition, it includes part of the city of Presque Isle and unorganized territory of Central Aroostook.

Willette was also the House Chairman of the Legislative Youth Advisory Council for the 125th Legislature. In the next session, he was elected as Assistant Minority Leader of the House GOP leadership. In his first term in the Maine House, Willette sponsored a resolution which passed raising the speed limit on I-95 between Houlton and Old Town. He resigned his seat on September 4, 2014, stating that his work on Governor Paul LePage's reelection campaign rendered him unable to adequately represent his district.

==== Committee assignments ====
- Leaves of Absence
- Rules and Business
- Transportation
- Veterans and Legal Affairs

=== 2014 congressional election ===
On July 1, 2013, Willette announced he would run for the open Maine's 2nd congressional district seat, after incumbent congressman Mike Michaud announced he would run for governor, though he suspended his campaign on August 28, 2013.

=== State of Maine ===
In 2014, Willette served as Director of Communications and Coalitions for Paul LePage's Campaign for Governor. During 2014 and 2015, he served as Director of Legislative Affairs and Communications for the Department of Administrative and Financial Services. From 2015 to 2019, Willette served as an Assistant District Attorney.

== Other activities ==
From 2008 to 2018, Willette was an Associate Broker for Big Bear Real Estate. After leaving the Trump administration, he returned to that position. From 2013 to 2019, Willette served as a member of the Republican National Committee representing the State of Maine.

== Military service ==
He joined the Maine Army National Guard in May 2017. As a captain, he served as a State Trial Defense Counsel. Previously he had served As the Assistant Brigade Judge Advocate for the 120th Regional Support Group in Bangor, Maine.

== Trump administration ==
Willette joined the Trump administration in 2019. From April 2019 to January 2021, he served as a Special Assistant to the President and Deputy Director of Political Affairs for Outreach in the Executive Office of the President.

== Personal life ==
Willette is married to Melissa Willette and they live in Mapleton. He is a Master Mason with the Trinity lodge. Willette is an Eagle Scout with Troop 170 in Mapleton and 171 in Presque Isle. His father, Michael Willette, served in the Maine House of Representatives from 2008 to 2012, representing District 5 in Presque Isle.
