= Presque Isle High School =

Location
- 16 Griffin St; Presque Isle, Maine 04769; United States
- Coordinates: 46°41′07″N 68°00′20″W

Information
- Type: Public secondary
- School district: Maine School Administrative District 1
- Principal: David Bartlett
- Teaching staff: 34.70 (FTE)
- Grades: 9–12
- Enrollment: 484 (2024-2025)
- Student to teacher ratio: 13.66
- Colors: Columbia blue and white
- Mascot: Wildcats
- National ranking: 67th in Maine
- Yearbook: The Ship
- Website: www.sad1.org/o/pihs

Presque Isle High School is a secondary school for students located in Presque Isle, Maine, United States. Associated with Maine School Administrative District No. 1 (MSAD1), the school serves the communities of Castle Hill, Chapman, Mapleton, Presque Isle, and Westfield. In sports it is a class B school. It has about 530 students.

On September 11, 2011, it was announced that MSAD1 students, including PIHS students, could someday study in Beijing, People's Republic of China due to a growing partnership between the district and Niulanshan First Secondary School. In 2014 the district announced that the school will offer a Chinese class and will also host six Chinese students for the 2014–2015 school year. However, a few short years later, the Chinese language class was dropped from the curriculum after the district failed to renew the instructor's work visa, and to this date, no SAD1 student has studied abroad in Beijing.

== Alumni ==
- John Cariani, actor (Fiddler on the Roof Tony nominee, Something Rotten!, Law & Order) and playwright (Almost, Maine)
- Jessica McClintock (Jessie Earle Gagnon), class of 1948, fashion designer
- Ellis Paul (Paul Plissey), folk musician, author
- Warren Silver, state supreme court justice
- Alexander Willette, state legislator
- Gerald E. Williams, World War II pilot
- Warren Zubrick, Famous Engineer
