= Andy Palmer (runner) =

American distance runner (born 1953)

Personal information
- Born: November 26, 1953 Madawaska, Maine, United States
- Died: February 2, 2002 (aged 48) Blowing Rock, North Carolina, United States

Sport
- Country: United States
- Event(s): Marathon, half marathon
- College team: University of Maine at Presque Isle

Achievements and titles
- Personal best(s): Marathon: 2:16:25; 20 km: 1:01:53; 10 miles: 47:52

Andy Palmer was an American distance runner and coach. He competed in the U.S. Olympic Trials marathon in 1984 and 1988. Palmer was also the Founder of ZAP Endurance, a high-performance training center for endurance athletes.

== Early life ==
Palmer grew up in Madawaska, Maine and attended Madawaska High School, where he played basketball. He continued his basketball career at the University of Maine at Presque Isle. Palmer didn't start running until after college at age 23.

He relocated to Boston in the late 1970s and began training with elite marathoners, Bill Rodgers and Charlie Spedding. Palmer ran 150 to 190 miles per week, far more than most runners can tolerate, and he routinely did hill workouts wearing a 40-pound vest.

== Career ==
His training led to world-class performances beginning in 1981. At the Cherry Blossom 10-mile in Washington, DC, Palmer placed fifth in a time of 47:52. In 1983, he recorded a 2:16:25 marathon, which qualified him for the 1984 U.S. Olympic Trials Marathon. He also placed in the top 10 at the USA 20 km Championship in New Haven, CT. He repeated the feat in 1984.

Palmer made it to the 1988 Olympic Trials Marathon before stepping back from competitive racing to focus on teaching and coaching. He owned and operated the Maine Running Camp in Bar Harbor, Maine for over 20 years.

With his wife, Zika, Palmer founded ZAP Endurance in Blowing Rock, North Carolina, a high-performance training center for top-tier post-collegiate distance runners. Although Palmer died suddenly of a heart attack in 2002 shortly before ZAP opened, it ended its operation at the end of 2025.

Palmer was inducted into the Maine Running Hall of Fame in 2000.
