= Grand Isle (CDP), Maine =

Grand Isle, Maine
- Census-designated place
- Location within Maine Location within the United States
- Coordinates: 47°18′23″N 68°09′19″W
- Country: United States
- State: Maine
- County: Aroostook
- Town: Grand Isle

Area
  - Total: 0.69 sq mi (1.80 km^{2})
  - Land: 0.62 sq mi (1.60 km^{2})
  - Water: 0.073 sq mi (0.19 km^{2})
- Elevation: 505 ft (154 m)

Population (2020)
  - Total: 184
  - Density: 297.0/sq mi (114.68/km^{2})
- Time zone: UTC-5 (Eastern (EST))
  - Summer (DST): UTC-4 (EDT)
- ZIP Code: 04746
- Area code: 207
- FIPS code: 23-28555
- GNIS feature ID: 2804663

Grand Isle is a census-designated place (CDP) and the primary village in the town of Grand Isle, Aroostook County, Maine, United States. It is in the northwestern corner of the town, situated on high ground overlooking the St. John River, which forms the Canada–United States border. The Canadian province of New Brunswick is to the northeast across the river.

U.S. Route 1 passes through Grand Isle, leading northwest 9 miles (14 km) to Madawaska and southeast 15 miles (24 km) to Van Buren.

Grand Isle was first listed as a CDP prior to the 2020 census.

== Demographics ==
Historical population
Census	Pop.	Note	%±
2020	184		—
U.S. Decennial Census
