= Emily Turner =

Emily Turner may refer to:

- Emily Turner (ice hockey)
- Emily Turner (philanthropist)
