= Valley Times =

The Valley Times may refer to any of the following newspapers:

- Valley Times (North Las Vegas), a defunct daily in North Las Vegas, Nevada, U.S.
- The Valley Times (Scottsdale, Arizona), a U.S. weekly
- Alberni Valley Times, in Port Alberni, Vancouver Island, B.C., Canada
- Beaverton Valley Times (named simply The Valley Times from 1962 to 1989), in Beaverton, Oregon, U.S.
- Dupont Valley Times, in Fort Wayne, Indiana, U.S.
- San Fernando Valley Times, a newspaper serving California's San Fernando Valley
- St. John Valley Times, in Maine, U.S.
- Contra Costa Times, in Walnut Creek, California, U.S., which publishes (or published) some editions as the Valley Times
