= Caribou High School =

Location
- 308 Sweden Street; Caribou, Aroostook, Maine 04736; United States
- 46°51′49″N 68°02′00″W

Information
- School type: Public, high school
- Opened: 1966
- School district: RSU 39 | Eastern Aroostook
- CEEB code: 200225
- Principal: Jamie Selfridge
- Teaching staff: 28.30
- Grades: 9–12
- Enrollment: 440 (2023-2024)
- Student to teacher ratio: 15.55
- Colors: Maroon, Gold, and White
- Mascot: The Viking
- Nickname: Caribou
- Team name: The Vikings
- Yearbook: Spectator
- Communities served: Caribou; Connor; Stockholm; Woodland
- Feeder schools: Caribou Community School
- Website: www.rsu39.org/o/chs

Caribou High School is a public high school in Caribou, Maine, United States. It serves students in grades 9-12 from Caribou, Connor Township, Stockholm, and Woodland. The school's Future Farmers of America chapter is one of the oldest chapters in the state, and one of the school's first clubs.

== Athletics & activities ==
=== Classification ===
Caribou High School participates in Class B/Class B North for all of its respective sports.

=== State Championships ===
- Boys' Basketball: 1969, 2019, 2020
- Girls' Basketball: 1983
- Boys' Cross Country: 2010
- Girls' Cross Country: 1990
- E-Sports:
  - Rocket League: Fall 2022
- Alpine Ski: 2023
- Ski: 1974
- Girls' Soccer: 1986
- Boys' Tennis: 2008, 2018
- Girls' Tennis: 1992-1995
- Boys' Outdoor Track: 2018

==== Runner-Up ====
- Baseball: 2014
- Boys' Basketball: 1958, 1975, 1983
- Girls' Basketball: 1984
- E-Sports:
  - Rocket League: Fall 2021, Spring 2022
- Boys' Soccer: 2019
- Girls' Soccer: 1988, 2010
- Softball: 1989
- Girls' Tennis: 1999, 2000, 2004, 2005, 2010, 2017, 2018

=== Maine Principals' Association (MPA) Sportsmanship Awards ===
This award recognizes high school sports teams that exemplify good sportsmanship.

- Boys' Basketball: 1986, 1989, 1990, 1994, 1998, 2001, 2006
- Girls' Basketball: 1987, 1988, 1993, 2003, 2014, 2017
- Boys' Cross Country: 2014-2016, 2022
- Girls' Cross Country: 2014-2016, 2022 (Note: Shared with Cony High School.)
- Boys' Alpine ski: 2016
- Girls' Alpine ski: 2017
- Boys' Nordic ski: 2016
- Girls' Nordic ski: 2016
- Softball: 2012, 2022, 2023
- Boys' Outdoor Track: 2016-2018
- Girls' Outdoor Track: 2016, 2018, 2023 (Note: Shared with Presque Isle High School.)
- Wrestling: 1991, 1998, 2002, 2008, 2018

== Demographics ==
=== Gender ===
- Male: 243 (53%)
- Female: 216 (47%)

=== Race/Ethnicity ===
- American Indian/Alaska Native: 3.1%
- Asian: 0.7%
- Native Hawaiian/Pacific Islander: 0%
- Hispanic: 3.1%
- Black, non-Hispanic: 2%
- White, non-Hispanic: 87.4%
- Two or More Races: 3.9%

== Notable people ==
=== Alumni ===
- Samuel Collins, Jr., judge and member of the Maine Senate
- Susan Collins, United States senator for Maine
- Gregory Johnson, Navy admiral
- Jessica Meir, astronaut and marine biologist.

=== Staff ===
- John Lisnik, politician and former teacher
- Kevin St. Jarre, author, soldier, and former teacher
