= Mabel Desmond =

Member of the Maine House of Representatives

Member of the Maine House of Representatives for the 146th District
- In office December 1994 – December 2002

Personal details
- Born: Mabel J. Lenentine; January 30, 1929 Southampton, New Brunswick, Canada
- Died: March 2, 2023 (aged 94) Mapleton, Maine, U.S.
- Party: Democrat
- Spouse: Jerry Desmond (m. 1951; died 2007)
- Children: 4
- Education: University of Maine at Presque Isle
- Profession: public school teacher

Mabel J. Desmond (née Lenentine; January 30, 1929 – March 2, 2023) was an American politician and schoolteacher from Maine.

Desmond was born in Southampton, New Brunswick, the daughter of Charles and Ada (née Ritchie) Lenentine. She graduated from Aroostook State Normal School in 1949. She married Jerry Desmond in 1951, and they would have four children. She taught public school from 1949 to 1994 in Bridgewater, Presque Isle, Mapleton, and Ashland. Meanwhile, Desmond earned a bachelor's from the Aroostook State Teacher's College in 1964 and a Master's in Education from the University of Maine in 1975. She was also an adjunct professor at University of Maine at Presque Isle from 1991 to 1994. In 2007, the former teacher was appointed by Governor John Baldacci to the Maine State Board of Education.

Desmond, a Democrat, served four terms (1994–2002) as representative to the Maine House of Representatives. District 146 included parts of northern Aroostook County, including Ashland, Castle Hill, Mapleton, New Sweden, Wade, Washburn and Woodland. She served on the education and cultural affairs committee.
