= Madawaska School Department =

School district in Aroostook County, Maine, United States

Location
- Madawaska, Maine United States
- Coordinates: 47°21′15″N 68°19′33″W

District information
- Type: Public
- Grades: PreK–12
- Schools: 2
- NCES District ID: 2307800

Students and staff
- Students: 369
- Teachers: 35.00 (on FTE basis)
- Student–teacher ratio: 10.54:1
- District mascot: Owls

Other information
- Website: www.madawaskaschools.org

The Madawaska School Department in Madawaska, Maine serves the area of Madawaska, St. David, and Grand Isle. There are two schools that serve the student population: The Madawaska Elementary School and the Madawaska Middle/High School.

== Schools ==
Madawaska Elementary School is located at 353 11th Avenue in Madawaska. Built in 1994, this school serves students from pre-K through 5th grades.

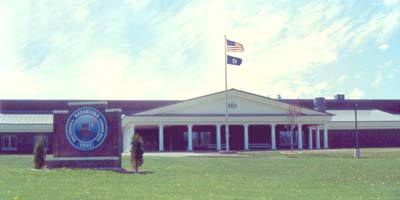
Madawaska Elementary School, 353 11th Avenue, Madawaska, ME 04756

Madawaska Middle/High School is located at 135 Seventh Avenue in Madawaska. This school serves students from 6th to 12th grade. The first section of this school was built in 1940s, with major additions and renovations through the years.
