= John Lisnik =

American politician (1946–2020)

Member of the Maine House of Representatives
- In office 1980–1990

Personal details
- Born: December 19, 1946 Presque Isle, Maine
- Died: April 24, 2020 (aged 73) Presque Isle, Maine
- Party: Democratic

John Lisnik (December 19, 1946 – April 24, 2020) was an American politician and administrator in the University of Maine System. In 1980, Lisnik was elected to the Maine House of Representatives as a Democrat, replacing retiring Republican Bruce Roope. Lisnik was born in Presque Isle, Maine and graduated from area schools in 1965 before enlisting in the United States Army during the Vietnam War. He was a paratrooper and was honorably discharged in 1968 after serving in the 101st Airborne Division. He graduated from the University of Maine at Presque Isle in 1972 and taught social studies in Falmouth, Maine for a year. He then received a fellowship to study at the University of Notre Dame, where he earned a M.A. in government and international affairs. He returned to Aroostook County thereafter and taught at Caribou High School. At the time of his announcement to run for the House of Representatives, Lisnik was vice chairman of the Presque Isle city democratic committee.

He was the Assistant to the Chancellor for Governmental Relations for the University of Maine system, where he represented the system in the Maine Legislature.

He died on April 24, 2020, in Presque Isle, Maine at age 73.
