= Aroostook Farm =

Experimental farm in Maine, U.S.

Coordinates: 46°39′22″N 68°00′59″W

Aroostook Farm is an experimental farm near Presque Isle, Maine. Founded in 1914, it is the largest (507 acres (205 ha) of the University of Maine's five experimental farms. In January 2020, Potato Grower Magazine wrote that "over the last century-plus, much has been accomplished on that plot of land that has brought the entire North American potato industry into the future, while remaining steadfastly focused on the growers, processors and wholesalers of Maine."
