= Emilien Levesque =

American politician

Emilien A. Levesque (1922 – August 21, 2003) was an American politician from Maine. Levesque, a Democrat from Madawaska, served five terms (1960–1970) in the Maine House of Representatives. He spent his final three terms in leadership, including one term as House Majority Leader (1964–1966) and two as House Minority Leader (1966–1970).

Levesque was born in 1922 in Grand Isle, Maine. He attended high school in Van Buren, Maine. He was drafted into the United States Army to fight in World War II in 1943. During the war, Levesque saw action primarily in Italy and Germany before being taken prisoner in Germany. He was released from the prisoner hospital in 1945. Levesque was of French-Canadian descent, as was the majority of residents of the St. John Valley area of northern Maine.
