= Easton, Maine =

Town in Maine, United States

- Town
- Seal

- Location of Easton, Maine
- Coordinates: 46°38′15″N 67°51′18″W
- Country: United States
- State: Maine
- County: Aroostook
- Villages: Easton; Easton Center; Easton Station

Area
  - Total: 38.93 sq mi (100.83 km^{2})
  - Land: 38.71 sq mi (100.26 km^{2})
  - Water: 0.22 sq mi (0.57 km^{2})
- Elevation: 807 ft (246 m)

Population (2020)
  - Total: 1,320
  - Density: 34/sq mi (13.2/km^{2})
- Time zone: UTC-5 (Eastern (EST))
  - Summer (DST): UTC-4 (EDT)
- ZIP code: 04740
- Area code: 207
- FIPS code: 23-21380
- GNIS feature ID: 582459
- Website: www.eastonme.com

Easton is a town in Aroostook County, Maine, United States. The population was 1,320 at the 2020 census.

== History ==
In 1851, the first known residence in the Easton wilderness was built by Henry Wilson, who had taught school in Presque Isle. When Solomon Bolster arrived in 1854, he joined Henry Wilson and Augustus Rackliffe, its sole residents. In 1855–1856, Noah Barker partitioned the township into 142 lots of 160 acres in size, thereby determining its layout. The state opened it for settlement and, on July 26, 1856, it was organized as the Fremont Plantation. A schoolhouse was built in 1858 and the first of several lumber mills was constructed in another year. By 1860, the population was 320. Growth of the population slowed during the Civil War, and the town of Easton was incorporated 1865. Economic growth was slow, evidenced by an 1862 record that taxes should be paid in grain or shingles. The first store was opened in 1863. A starch factory was built in 1877, and a steam shingle mill in 1879. Easton became "one of the greatest potato producing towns in the County". The 1880s saw the appearance of the Methodists, Free Will Baptists and the Odd Fellows. By 1880 the population was 835; by 1890, 978.

== Geography ==
According to the United States Census Bureau, the town has a total area of 38.93 square miles (100.83 km^{2}), of which 38.71 square miles (100.26 km^{2}) is land and 0.22 square miles (0.57 km^{2}) is water.

=== Climate ===
This climatic region is typified by large seasonal temperature differences, with warm to hot (and often humid) summers and cold (sometimes severely cold) winters. According to the Köppen Climate Classification system, Easton has a humid continental climate, abbreviated "Dfb" on climate maps.

== Demographics ==
Historical population
Census	Pop.	Note	%±
1860	320		—
1870	522		63.1%
1880	835		60.0%
1890	978		17.1%
1900	1,215		24.2%
1910	1,300		7.0%
1920	1,451		11.6%
1930	1,505		3.7%
1940	1,605		6.6%
1950	1,664		3.7%
1960	1,389		−16.5%
1970	1,305		−6.0%
1980	1,305		0.0%
1990	1,291		−1.1%
2000	1,249		−3.3%
2010	1,287		3.0%
2020	1,320		2.6%
U.S. Decennial Census

=== 2010 census ===
At the 2010 census, there were 1,287 people, 536 households and 352 families living in the town. The population density was 33.2 people per square mile (12.8 people/km^{2}). There were 596 housing units at an average density of 15.4 units per square mile (5.9 units/km^{2}). The racial makeup of the town was 96.6% White, 0.3% African American, 0.9% Native American, 0.1% Asian, 0.1% from other races, and 2.0% from two or more races. Hispanic or Latino of any race were 0.9% of the population.

There were 536 households, of which 28.4% had children under the age of 18 living with them, 52.4% were married couples living together, 9.0% had a female householder with no husband present, 4.3% had a male householder with no wife present, and 34.3% were non-families. 29.1% of all households were made up of individuals, and 13.1% had someone living alone who was 65 years of age or older. The average household size was 2.40 and the average family size was 2.94.

The median age was 42.5 years. 23.7% of residents were under the age of 18; 6% were between the ages of 18 and 24; 23.4% were from 25 to 44; 31.1% were from 45 to 64; and 15.9% were 65 years of age or older. The gender makeup of the town was 49.7% male and 50.3% female.

=== 2000 census ===
At the 2000 census, there were 1,249 people, 524 households and 355 families living in the town. The population density was 32.2 inhabitants per square mile (12.4/km^{2}). There were 566 housing units at an average density of 14.6 units per square mile (5.6 units/km^{2}). The racial makeup of the town was 97.28% White, 0.32% African American, 1.68% Native American, 0.32% Asian, and 0.40% from two or more races. Hispanic or Latino of any race were 0.56% of the population.

There were 524 households, of which 28.8% had children under the age of 18 living with them, 56.5% were married couples living together, 8.0% had a female householder with no husband present, and 32.1% were non-families. 27.9% of all households were made up of individuals, and 13.5% had someone living alone who was 65 years of age or older. The average household size was 2.38 and the average family size was 2.90.

23.1% of the population were under the age of 18, 8.0% from 18 to 24, 28.3% from 25 to 44, 25.7% from 45 to 64, and 15.0% who were 65 years of age or older. The median age was 40 years. For every 100 females, there were 94.2 males. For every 100 females age 18 and over, there were 90.3 males.

The median household income was $29,922 and the median family income was $36,500. Males had a median income of $27,917 and females $20,735. The per capita income was $15,227. About 7.4% of families and 12.5% of the population were below the poverty line, including 18.8% of those under the age of 18 and 13.5% of those 65 and older.

== Places of interest ==
- Francis Malcolm Science Institute (Planetarium)

== Education ==
Easton is part of the Easton School System.

== Notable people ==
- Tyler Clark, politician
- Daniel Wathen, Chief Justice of the Maine Supreme Judicial Court
