= University of Maine at Presque Isle =

Public university in Presque Isle, Maine, US

- Former names: Aroostook State Normal School (1903–1952); The Aroostook State Teachers College (1952–1965); The Aroostook State College (1965–1971)
- Motto: North of Ordinary
- Type: Public university
- Established: 1903; 123 years ago
- Parent institution: University of Maine System
- Endowment: $5M
- Chancellor: Dannel Malloy
- President: Ray Rice
- Vice-Chancellor: Carolyn Dorsey
- Provost: Alana Margeson
- Students: 2,171 (fall 2024)
- Undergraduates: 2,056 (fall 2024)
- Postgraduates: 115 (fall 2024)
- Location: Presque Isle, Maine, United States; 46°40′15″N 68°1′0″W
- Campus: 150 acres (0.61 km^{2})
- Colors: Blue and gold
- Nickname: Owls
- Sporting affiliations: NCAA Division III – NAC; EISA
- Mascot: Hootie the Owl
- Website: www.umpi.edu

The University of Maine at Presque Isle (UMaine Presque Isle or UMPI) is a public university in Presque Isle, Maine. It is part of the University of Maine System and one of two University of Maine System schools in Aroostook County (the other being the University of Maine at Fort Kent).

== History ==
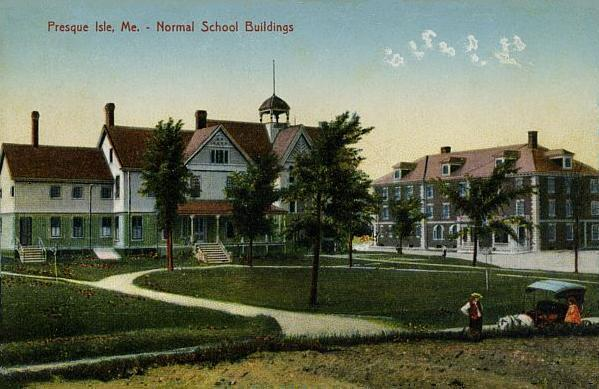
Aroostook State Normal School in 1908, now the University of Maine at Presque Isle

The college began in 1903 as Aroostook State Normal School which offered a two-year teacher preparation program. It has undergone four name changes since then: The Aroostook State Teachers College in 1952; The Aroostook State College in 1965; The Aroostook State College of the University of Maine when it joined the new University of Maine System in 1968; and finally the University of Maine at Presque Isle in 1971.

UMPI's wind turbine began generating clean energy in late spring 2009 after the university reached an agreement with general contractor Lumus Construction Inc. on a $2 million project to install a 600-kilowatt wind turbine on the campus. This agreement established UMPI as the first college or university in the state and one of only a handful in New England to install a midsize wind turbine, according to officials. The wind turbine produces about 1 million kilowatt-hours of electricity per year and saves the institution more than $100,000 annually in electricity charges and saves an estimated 572 tons of carbon dioxide from being released into the atmosphere each year.

In January 2015, officials from the Foundation of the University of Maine at Presque Isle announced their completion of efforts to completely divest from all fossil fuels on campus. This effort began in fall 2013 and ended in November 2014. UMPI installed a 999 voltage solar panel array on the roof of its major classroom buildings Folsom and Pullen Halls as well as a biomass boiler and heat pump technology inside those buildings.

== Academics ==
UMPI currently offers 2 master's degree programs, 22 baccalaureate degree programs, 7 associate degree programs, and 5 certificate programs.

The institution began using a proficiency-based model for certain programs in 2018. It also began allowing students who would otherwise fail a course to re-do material to ensure they pass.

The college received a $2.25 million grant to add programs in computer science and health administration in 2019.

=== Online learning ===
UMPI offers self-paced online baccalaureate programs. In 2020 UMPI added its first masters program, a Masters in Organizational Leadership. UMPI also offers three semester-based online bachelor's degrees.

UMPI's OpenU program allows learners of all ages to take specific online and on-site course for free if they are not currently enrolled in a degree program. In April 2026, The Washington Post featured UMPI's YourPace program in a story about "degree hacking". The article reported that "of the nearly 300 students who earned a bachelor’s in the YourPace program in fall 2024, the vast majority finished in less than a year. More than 1 in 4 finished their entire degree course load in a single eight-week session, half the length of a traditional academic semester." One student, Christie Williams, finished eleven classes in four weeks and a master's degree program in five weeks.

== Northern Maine Museum of Science ==
The Northern Maine Museum of Science began in the early 1970s on the UMPI campus. It is located in Folsom Hall.

== Student life ==
Undergraduate demographics as of Fall 2023
Race and ethnicity	Total
White	60%
Hispanic	20%
Black	10%
International student	10%
Two or more races	4%
Unknown	3%
Asian	2%
American Indian/Alaska Native	1%
Economic diversity
Low-income (Note: The percentage of students who received an income-based federal Pell grant intended for low-income students.)	43%
Affluent (Note: The percentage of students who are a part of the American middle class at the bare minimum.)	57%

=== Athletics ===
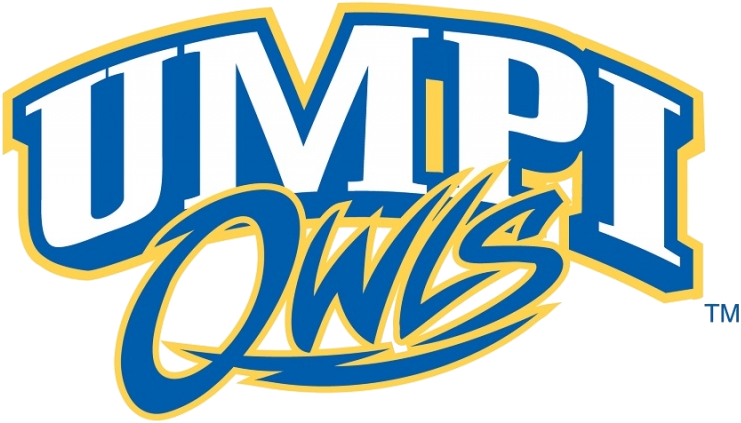
UMPI Owls wordmark

UMPI has 12 varsity sport programs and is a member of NCAA Division III and in 2018 joined the North Atlantic Conference. The college previously competed in the National Association of Intercollegiate Athletics (NAIA) and in the United States Collegiate Athletic Association as part of the Sunrise Athletic Conference Men's and women's sports include: cross country running, soccer, basketball and Nordic skiing (governed by the USCSA). Male only sports include: golf and baseball.

Women only sports: softball and volleyball. In addition, the university also hosts a variety of intramural sports and one club sport, ice hockey. The University Ice Hockey Club Team was the first team to play in the Alfond Arena against the University of Maine Black Bears losing 4–3 on February 4, 1977. The 1979 Wrestling team won the Northern New England Wrestling Championship, and the 1978 Women's Field Hockey team won the Maine State Championships.

The school's sports teams are called the Owls and team colors are blue and gold.

=== Greek life ===
UMPI is the location of chapters of Kappa Delta Phi national fraternity, the affiliated Kappa Delta Phi sorority, and Phi Eta Sigma honor society.

== Notable faculty and alumni ==
=== Faculty ===
- Caroline D. Gentile – Associate Professor Emeritus of Physical Education; longest-serving faculty member of the University of Maine at Presque Isle.

=== Alumni ===
- Mabel Desmond – Class of 1964, served four terms in the Maine House of Representatives, from 1994 to 2002
- James "Chico" Hernandez – Class of 1979, USA National Champion, FIAS World Cup Vice-Champion in Sambo wrestling, featured on a box of Wheaties
- John Lisnik – Class of 1972, served in the Maine House of Representatives.
- John Tuttle – served in the Maine House of Representatives.
- Tyler Clark - Maine House of Representatives for the 6th District.
- Ghazaleh "Oz" Sailors - Former Professional Female Baseball Player & Coach .
- Andy Palmer, distance runner and coach
