= Madawaska High School =

Madawaska Middle/High School

Location
- 135 Seventh Avenue; Madawaska, Aroostook, Maine 04756; United States
- Coordinates: 47°21′10″N 68°19′33″W

Information
- Type: Public school
- Authority: Madawaska School Department
- Principal: Wayne Anderson
- Teaching staff: 18.50
- Grades: 7–12
- Gender: Boys and Girls
- Age range: 12 to 20 years old
- Enrollment: 205 (2024–2025)
- Student to teacher ratio: 11.08
- Language: French and English
- Colors: Blue and White
- Mascot: Owl
- Team name: Madawaska Owls
- Accreditation: New England Association of Schools and Colleges (NEASC)
- Website: mmhs.madawaskaschools.org/en-US

Madawaska Middle/High School is a public secondary school, serving grades 7 through 12, located in Madawaska, Maine, United States. The school serves students in from Madawaska, Saint David, and Grand Isle. The building also hosts the area's adult education program. It was first established in the 1940s.

Madawaska Middle/High school is in the Maine Principal's Association Class "C" for sports. The school's mascot is the owl. The school colors are blue and white.
