= Saint David, Maine =

Saint David Saint-David (French)
- Village
- Location within Maine Location within the United States
- Coordinates: 47°20′22″N 68°13′53″W
- Country: United States
- State: Maine
- County: Aroostook
- Town: Madawaska
- Elevation: 522 ft (159 m)
- Time zone: UTC-5 (Eastern (EST))
  - Summer (DST): UTC-4 (EDT)
- ZIP code: 04773
- Area code: 207
- GNIS feature ID: 574700

Saint David is an unincorporated village in the town of Madawaska, in Aroostook County, Maine, United States. The community is located on U.S. Route 1 in the Saint John River Valley, 4.5 miles (7.2 km) east of the village of Madawaska. Saint David has a post office, with ZIP code 04773.
