= Tyler Clark =

American politician

Tyler A. Clark

Member of the Maine House of Representatives for the 6th District (Easton)
- In office December 2008 – December 2014
- Preceded by: Jackie Lundeen
- Succeeded by: Aj Edgecomb

Personal details
- Born: Easton, Maine
- Party: Republican
- Spouse: Kristin Clark
- Education: University of Maine at Presque Isle
- Profession: Campaign Marketing

Tyler A. Clark is an American politician from Maine. A Republican, Clark served in the Maine House of Representatives from 2008 until 2014. He ran unsuccessfully in 2006. He earned a B.A. from the University of Maine at Presque Isle in 2008, and a Masters in Business from New England College of Business During his second and third term in the Legislature, Clark was a member of the influential Appropriations and Financial Affairs Committee.

Citing the low pay for state legislators, Clark announced in July 2014 that he would not seek a 4th term in the Maine House.
