= Oz Sailors =

American baseball coach and former professional pitcher

Ghazaleh "Oz" Sailors
Personal information
- Nationality: American
- Born: June 10, 1993 (age 33)
- Education: University of Maine at Presque Isle
- Occupations: Baseball player, coach

Sport
- Sport: Baseball
- Position: Pitcher
- Team: San Rafael Pacifics

Ghazaleh "Oz" Sailors (born June 10, 1993) is an American baseball coach and former professional pitcher. She is recognized as the first woman to pitch in an NCAA Division I baseball game and the first female head varsity baseball coach in California. Sailors has been inducted into the University of Maine's Owls Athletics Hall of Fame.

== Early life and education ==
Born in Santa Barbara, California, Sailors played baseball throughout her youth. Despite excelling in high school baseball, she faced challenges in securing a college baseball opportunity, as many programs directed her toward softball. She eventually enrolled at the University of Maine at Presque Isle (UMPI), where she played as a pitcher and infielder from 2011 to 2015. In 2015, she served as team captain and became the first woman to pitch in an NCAA Division I baseball game in a matchup against the University of Maine. The National Baseball Hall of Fame in Cooperstown later preserved artifacts from this game.

In addition to baseball, Sailors participated in cross-country running and skiing at UMPI. She graduated in 2015 and was inducted into the University of Maine at Presque Isle Hall of Fame in 2024.

== Career ==
=== Playing career ===
Following graduation, Sailors signed with the Virginia Marlins of the World Baseball Pro League. She later played for the San Rafael Pacifics in California and Kyoto Flora in Japan's Women's Baseball League.

She also competed internationally, playing for the Central Coast Marlins in Australia and coaching youth baseball. In China, she worked with Major League Baseball. on a development initiative and played for the Shanghai Buccaneers. During this time, she contributed to a baseball curriculum designed for integration into Chinese physical education programs.

Sailors previously ran a youth baseball academy in the San Francisco Bay Area and served as the head baseball coach for Urban High School of San Francisco.

=== Coaching career ===
After sustaining an arm injury, Sailors transitioned to coaching, first in Oregon and later in California, where she became the head varsity baseball coach at Moreau Catholic High School in Hayward. This appointment made her the first female head varsity baseball coach in California and, at the time, the only female varsity baseball head coach in the United States. From 2018 to 2022, she coached at two high schools in the San Francisco Bay Area. She also served as the Director of International Development of The Desert League of Professional Baseball in 2018.

Between 2014 and 2024, Sailors was involved with Baseball for All, a nonprofit promoting girls’ participation in baseball, serving as an advisory board member and director of player development. She later joined the San Francisco Seals as a development coach, focusing on player conditioning, mental skills training, and academic preparation.

Sailors previously ran a youth baseball academy in the San Francisco Bay Area and served as the head baseball coach for Urban High School of San Francisco.

== Recognition ==
Sailors was nominated for NCAA Woman of the Year in 2015. That same year, the National Baseball Hall of Fame in Cooperstown recognized her contributions. In 2024, she was inducted into the University of Maine at Presque Isle Hall of Fame and received the International Women's Baseball Center Hustle Award.

== False death report ==
On June 28, 2024, Baseball For All erroneously reported Sailors’ death in a post that was later deleted. The misinformation was widely circulated by media outlets, including the Daily News, San Francisco Chronicle, and People Magazine. At the time of the announcement, Sailors was alive and receiving treatment for a critical and unconfirmed brain injury.

== Personal life ==
Sailors is a devout Christian who frequently speaks to youth about the importance of healthy living and abstaining from drugs and alcohol. In addition to her baseball career, she serves as a wilderness guide in the Southwest United States and supports programs for at-risk and abused children.
