= Presque Isle, Maine =

City in Maine, United States

- City
- The Downtown as of 2026.

- Seal
- Nickname: The Star City
- Motto: The Hub of Aroostook
- Location of Presque Isle, Maine

- Location Presque Isle (the United States)
- Coordinates: 46°40′46″N 68°00′08″W
- Country: United States
- State: Maine
- County: Aroostook
- Incorporated (town): April 4, 1859
- Incorporated (city): January 1, 1940

Area
  - Total: 77.60 sq mi (200.99 km^{2})
  - Land: 75.78 sq mi (196.27 km^{2})
  - Water: 1.82 sq mi (4.72 km^{2})
- Elevation: 637 ft (194 m)

Population (2020)
  - Total: 8,797
  - Density: 116.1/sq mi (44.82/km^{2})
- Demonym: Presqueillian
- Time zone: UTC−5 (Eastern (EST))
  - Summer (DST): UTC−4 (EDT)
- ZIP Code: 04769
- Area code: 207
- FIPS code: 23-60825
- GNIS feature ID: 582686
- Website: presqueislemaine.gov

Presque Isle (/prɛsk/ PRESK) is the commercial center and largest city in Aroostook County, Maine, United States. The population was 8,797 at the 2020 Census. The city is home to the University of Maine at Presque Isle, Northern Maine Community College, Northern Maine Fairgrounds, the Aroostook Centre Mall, and the Presque Isle International Airport.

Presque Isle is the headquarters of the Mi'kmaq Nation, a federally recognized tribe.

It is located less than 20 miles from the Canadian border.

== History ==
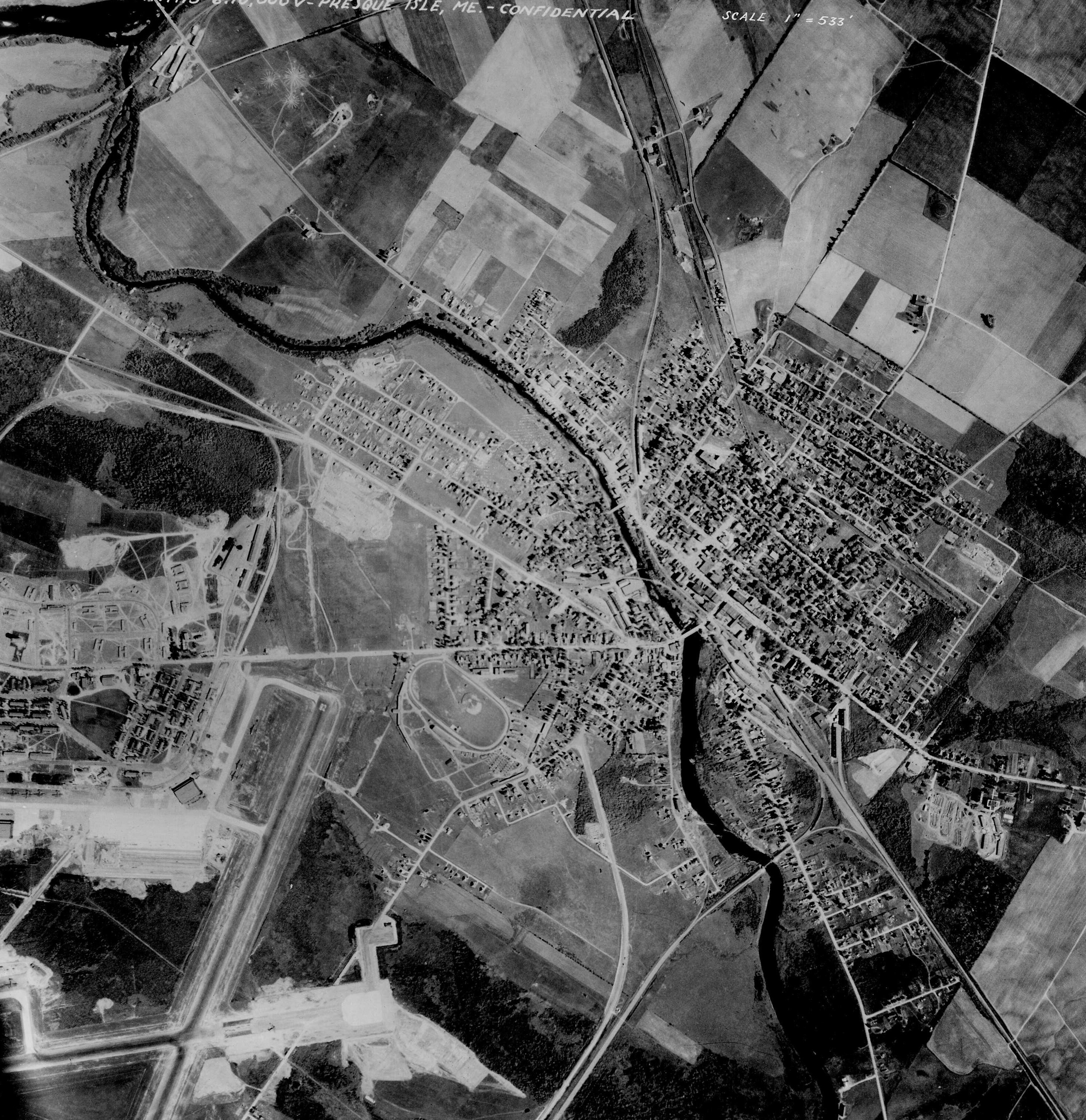
Presque Isle in 1944

The first European settlers were British Loyalists who reached the area in 1819 hoping to obtain land for lumber. Border disputes between the United States and the United Kingdom over the area, however, made it impossible for pioneers to gain title to the land. In response, the government of the neighboring British colony of New Brunswick (now a Canadian province) gave out patents for pioneers to live on the land but not claim ownership or sell it. By 1825, surveyors traveling along the Aroostook River noted that twenty families lived along it and noted that while agriculture was present, all of the families employed most of their time towards wood production.

The boundary dispute slowed development in the area, but the government of Massachusetts, which governed the territory at the time, saw the territory as theirs and encouraged the development of settlements in northern Maine by offering land grants and mill privileges in the 1820s. The first American to settle in the area was Dennis Fairbanks in 1828 who gained ownership over the land under the provisions set up by Massachusetts and later Maine, which gained statehood in 1820.

=== Name and incorporation ===
Originally known as Fairbanks for its founder Dennis Fairbanks, Presque Isle was settled in 1828 on land that was unknown to be part of British North America (Canada) or the United States. The Aroostook War broke out in 1838 because of boundary disputes between the two countries, which were resolved in 1842 by the Webster-Ashburton Treaty. The township was incorporated from Plantations F, G and H on April 4, 1859, as Presque Isle, derived from the French term for peninsula (presqu'île), as the courses of the Aroostook River and Presque Isle Stream form a peninsula. In 1864, Fairmount Cemetery was established in the south of Presque Isle to accommodate Union soldiers returning from the Civil War. The town of Maysville was annexed in 1883. Presque Isle was incorporated as a city on January 1, 1940.

=== Industry, agriculture and transportation ===
==== Lumbering and early industries ====
The first industry to form in Presque Isle was the lumber industry. By the 1880s, industry included two lumbermills, a gristmill, a wool carding mill, a furniture factory, a carriage factory and a tinware factory.

==== Agriculture ====
During the last 30 years of the 19th century, agriculture became important, and the entire county became noted for its production of potatoes. On October 9, 1851, the first Northern Maine Fair exhibition opened. A starch factory was opened in 1874, providing a ready market for local potatoes. In 1914 the Aroostook Farm was purchased as a Maine Agricultural Experiment Station.

==== Railroad ====
In 1881, the New Brunswick Railway created the first rail connection in Presque Isle. The Bangor and Aroostook Railroad arrived in 1895.

==== Airport ====
A small airport was established in 1931. It was expanded within the decade and later assumed major military importance. The Presque Isle Air Force Base, in operation between 1941 and 1961, was a major departure point for U.S. fighter planes during World War II and the Korean War due to its relative proximity to Europe. When the base was sold, a piece of it became the Northern Maine Regional Airport. In June 2018, the Northern Maine Regional Airport was renamed Presque Isle International Airport.

On July 2, 2018, United Airlines began service from the Presque Isle International Airport in Presque Isle, Maine to Newark Liberty International Airport in Newark, New Jersey. These flights were federally subsidized through the Essential Air Service (EAS) program, and were operated by United Express carrier, GoJet Airlines.

On 4 June 2024, the US Dept. of Transportation awarded Jet Blue its first ever essential air service contract to replace United Airlines at Presque Isle. The service is less frequent, but offers more capacity to Boston Logan than the previous service offered to Newark Liberty International.

=== Hospitals ===
The first Presque Isle Hospital was established on April 8, 1912. Four physicians were affiliated with the hospital, whose dual aims were to serve the community and to provide a training school for nurses. The building was a white-frame structure, enlarged from a home under construction. The need and demand for the hospital increased so rapidly that in 1921 a new three-story brick hospital was dedicated. This hospital was in operation for nearly four decades, when it, too, proved inadequate. A major fundraising campaign was launched in the late 1950s. After a large donation was given by Mr. and Mrs. W. H. Wildes, the daughter of the late Senator Arthur Gould, the Arthur R. Gould Memorial Hospital was constructed and opened in 1960. The hospital has expanded and been modernized in recent years, and in 1981 became part of The Aroostook Medical Center. The hospital remains in the community, it is owned and operated by Northern Light Healthcare System. The name of the facility is now known as Northern Light A.R. Gould Hospital.

=== The Double Eagle II ===
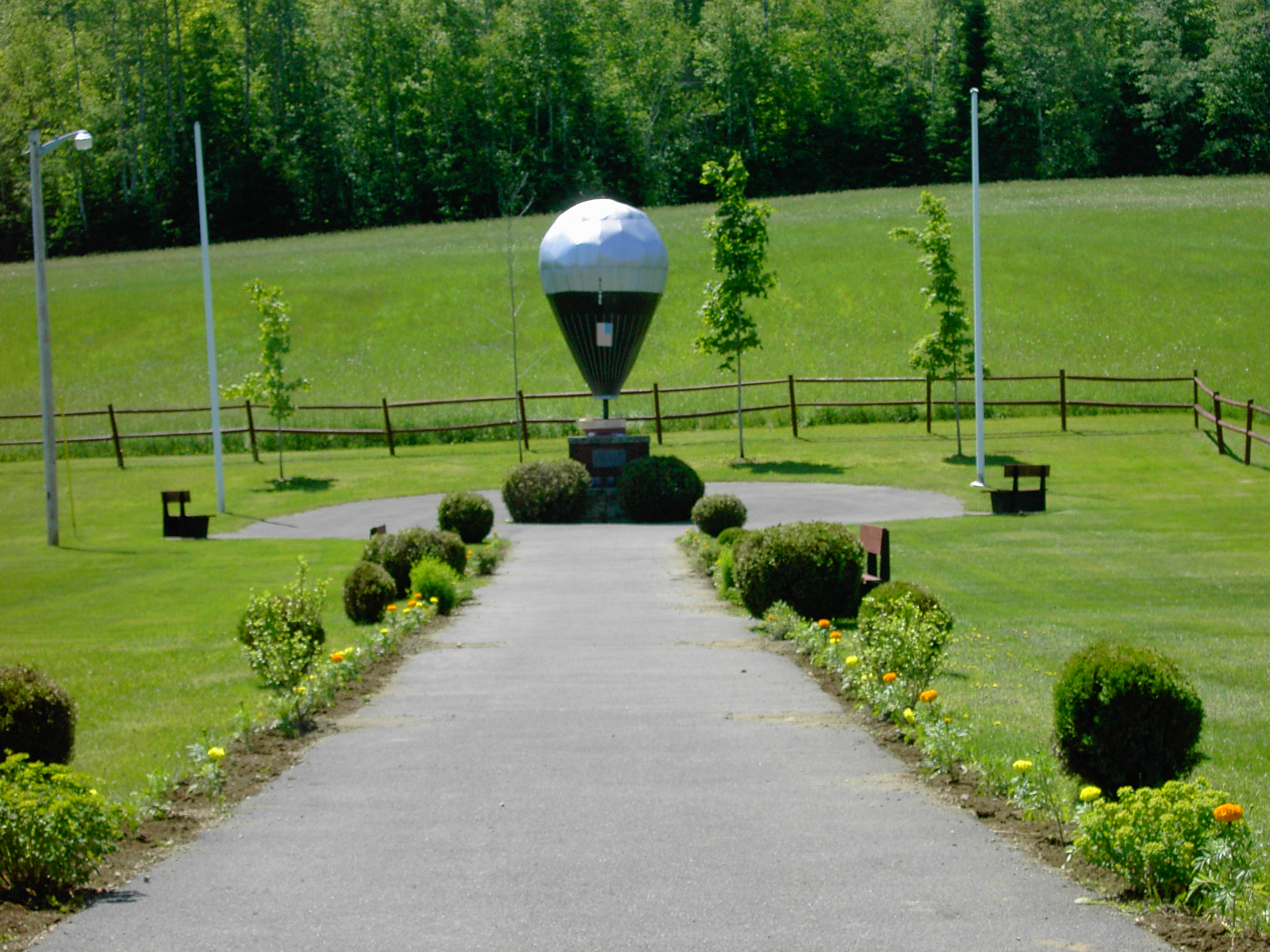
Commemorative model of Double Eagle II

On August 11, 1978, the Double Eagle II was launched from a Presque Isle field carrying three passengers. It made the first successful transatlantic balloon crossing. In honor of the Double Eagle II, the city holds an annual celebration called The Crown of Maine Balloon Festival. The popular event includes balloon rides, plane tours, amateur photo contests and children's fair rides. Sponsored by the Chamber of Commerce and other local organizations, it is held in late August. The field from which the Double Eagle II lifted off now features a commemorative model balloon.

=== All American City ===
Presque Isle was named an All American City in 1966.

=== Historic images ===
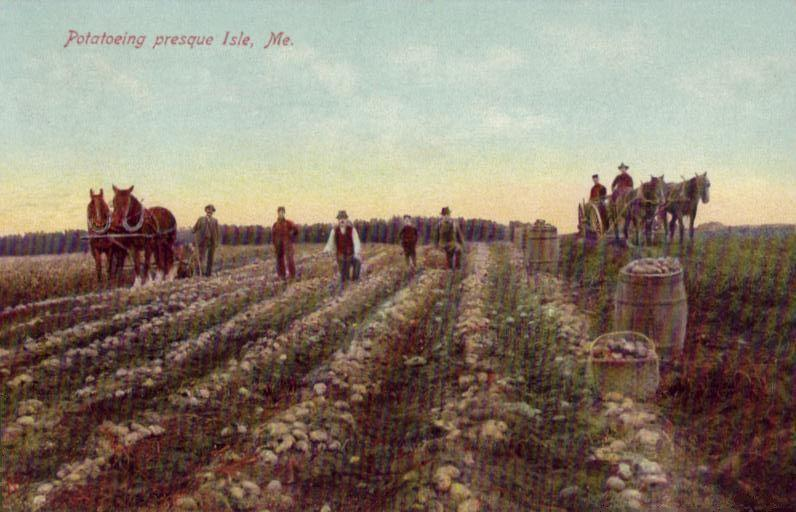
Potato harvesting in 1909

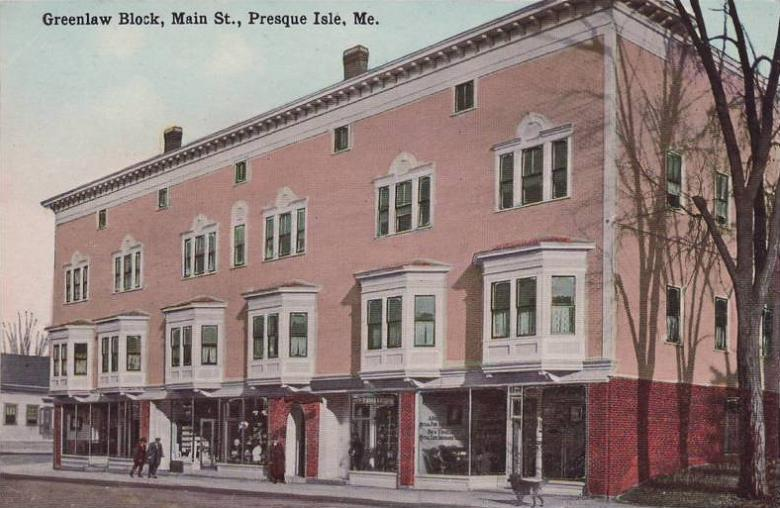
Greenlaw Block c. 1912

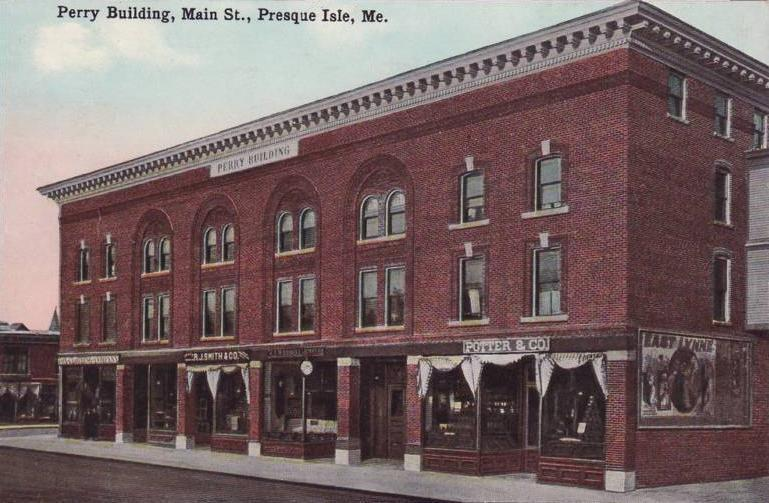
Old opera house c. 1912

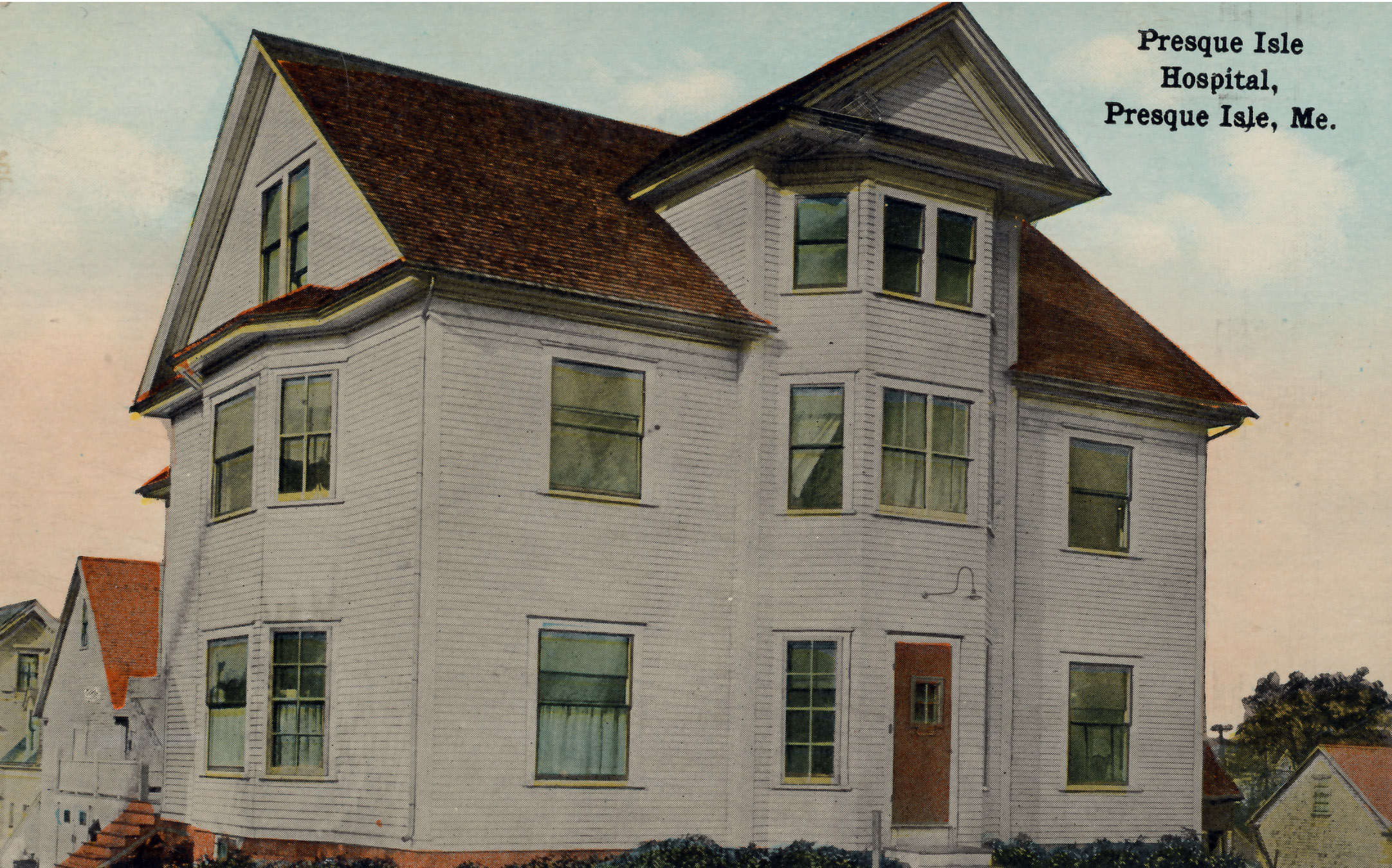
Presque Isle General Hospital, mid-1910s

== Geography and climate ==
According to the United States Census Bureau, the city has a total area of 77.60 square miles (200.98 km^{2}), of which 75.76 square miles (196.22 km^{2}) is land and 1.84 square miles (4.77 km^{2}) is water. Presque Isle is drained by the Aroostook River and Presque Isle Stream (also called Prestile Stream).

Presque Isle has a humid continental climate (Köppen: Dfb) typified by long cold winters and short warm summers.

Presque Isle is the driest city in Maine, with an annual precipitation of 38.5 in (980 mm). The local weather station operated from 1893 to 2019.

Climate data for Presque Isle, Maine (1991–2020 normals, extremes 1893–2019)
Month	Jan	Feb	Mar	Apr	May	Jun	Jul	Aug	Sep	Oct	Nov	Dec	Year
Record high °F (°C)	55 (13)	59 (15)	76 (24)	85 (29)	94 (34)	95 (35)	99 (37)	99 (37)	91 (33)	84 (29)	70 (21)	57 (14)	99 (37)
Mean maximum °F (°C)	44.0 (6.7)	41.8 (5.4)	51.4 (10.8)	69.0 (20.6)	81.9 (27.7)	87.1 (30.6)	88.6 (31.4)	87.5 (30.8)	82.7 (28.2)	72.0 (22.2)	59.7 (15.4)	47.2 (8.4)	90.8 (32.7)
Mean daily maximum °F (°C)	22.3 (−5.4)	25.9 (−3.4)	35.7 (2.1)	49.6 (9.8)	65.2 (18.4)	73.7 (23.2)	78.5 (25.8)	77.3 (25.2)	69.1 (20.6)	54.5 (12.5)	40.0 (4.4)	28.2 (−2.1)	51.7 (10.9)
Daily mean °F (°C)	12.8 (−10.7)	15.6 (−9.1)	25.9 (−3.4)	39.5 (4.2)	53.2 (11.8)	62.0 (16.7)	67.4 (19.7)	65.9 (18.8)	58.0 (14.4)	45.4 (7.4)	33.0 (0.6)	20.4 (−6.4)	41.6 (5.3)
Mean daily minimum °F (°C)	3.3 (−15.9)	5.3 (−14.8)	16.0 (−8.9)	29.3 (−1.5)	41.3 (5.2)	50.4 (10.2)	56.3 (13.5)	54.5 (12.5)	46.8 (8.2)	36.3 (2.4)	26.0 (−3.3)	12.5 (−10.8)	31.5 (−0.3)
Mean minimum °F (°C)	−21.2 (−29.6)	−17.0 (−27.2)	−9.3 (−22.9)	13.5 (−10.3)	28.4 (−2.0)	36.5 (2.5)	44.3 (6.8)	40.7 (4.8)	29.8 (−1.2)	21.0 (−6.1)	6.7 (−14.1)	−11.8 (−24.3)	−23.7 (−30.9)
Record low °F (°C)	−41 (−41)	−37 (−38)	−30 (−34)	−5 (−21)	16 (−9)	25 (−4)	35 (2)	29 (−2)	15 (−9)	8 (−13)	−15 (−26)	−35 (−37)	−41 (−41)
Average precipitation inches (mm)	2.53 (64)	1.92 (49)	2.35 (60)	2.79 (71)	3.29 (84)	3.81 (97)	3.66 (93)	3.81 (97)	3.51 (89)	4.16 (106)	3.06 (78)	3.16 (80)	38.05 (966)
Average snowfall inches (cm)	21.1 (54)	21.7 (55)	19.0 (48)	6.3 (16)	0.2 (0.51)	0.0 (0.0)	0.0 (0.0)	0.0 (0.0)	0.2 (0.51)	1.2 (3.0)	6.1 (15)	21.7 (55)	97.5 (248)
Average extreme snow depth inches (cm)	19.6 (50)	25.2 (64)	24.7 (63)	10.0 (25)	0.0 (0.0)	0.0 (0.0)	0.0 (0.0)	0.0 (0.0)	0.0 (0.0)	0.6 (1.5)	3.8 (9.7)	10.6 (27)	25.6 (65)
Average precipitation days (≥ 0.01 in)	11.0	8.1	9.7	11.5	12.7	13.0	14.0	11.5	10.3	12.9	11.1	11.2	137.0
Average snowy days (≥ 0.1 in)	9.0	6.7	6.0	2.1	0.2	0.0	0.0	0.0	0.0	0.4	3.1	7.3	34.8
Average relative humidity (%)	92	92	93	86	75	78	78	80	80	82	82	89	84
Mean daily sunshine hours	2.6	2.1	3.2	5.4	7.4	8.2	9.4	9.5	7.3	5.5	4.0	3.1	5.6
Mean daily daylight hours	9.1	10.4	12.0	13.6	15.1	15.8	15.4	14.1	12.5	10.9	9.4	8.6	12.2
Average ultraviolet index	1	1	1	2	4	5	5	4	3	2	1	1	3
Source 1: NOAA
Source 2: Weather Atlas (UV and humidity)

== Government ==
Presque Isle operates under the council-manager form of government. The city manager is Sonja Eyler.

== Demographics ==
Historical population
Census	Pop.	Note	%±
1860	723		—
1870	970		34.2%
1880	1,305		34.5%
1890	3,046		133.4%
1900	3,804		24.9%
1910	5,179		36.1%
1920	5,581		7.8%
1930	6,965		24.8%
1940	7,939		14.0%
1950	9,954		25.4%
1960	12,886		29.5%
1970	11,452		−11.1%
1980	11,172		−2.4%
1990	10,550		−5.6%
2000	9,511		−9.8%
2010	9,692		1.9%
2020	8,797		−9.2%
U.S. Decennial Census

=== Racial and ethnic composition ===
Racial Makeup
Race (NH = Non-Hispanic)	% 2020	% 2010	% 2000	Pop. 2020	Pop. 2010	Pop. 2000
White Alone (NH)	90%	93.7%	94.8%	7,920	9,077	9,013
Black Alone (NH)	0.9%	0.6%	0.3%	82	58	28
American Indian Alone (NH)	2.4%	2.2%	2.3%	210	218	215
Asian Alone (NH)	1.4%	0.9%	0.8%	127	85	80
Pacific Islander Alone (NH)	0%	0%	0%	1	4	3
Other Race Alone (NH)	0.3%	0%	0%	28	2	3
Multiracial (NH)	3%	1.2%	1.1%	266	121	107
Hispanic (Any race)	1.9%	1.3%	0.7%	163	127	62

=== 2020 census ===
As of the 2020 census, Presque Isle had a population of 8,797. The median age was 44.7 years. 19.6% of residents were under the age of 18 and 22.4% of residents were 65 years of age or older. For every 100 females there were 93.3 males, and for every 100 females age 18 and over there were 89.6 males age 18 and over.

60.9% of residents lived in urban areas, while 39.1% lived in rural areas.

There were 4,016 households in Presque Isle, of which 22.8% had children under the age of 18 living in them. Of all households, 38.3% were married-couple households, 21.0% were households with a male householder and no spouse or partner present, and 32.4% were households with a female householder and no spouse or partner present. About 38.8% of all households were made up of individuals and 17.7% had someone living alone who was 65 years of age or older.

There were 4,486 housing units, of which 10.5% were vacant. The homeowner vacancy rate was 2.2% and the rental vacancy rate was 7.8%.

=== 2010 census ===
As of the census of 2010, there were 9,692 people, 4,201 households, and 2,413 families residing in the city. The population density was 127.9 inhabitants per square mile (49.4/km^{2}). There were 4,608 housing units at an average density of 60.8 per square mile (23.5/km^{2}). The racial makeup of the city was 94.5% White, 0.6% African American, 2.4% Native American, 0.9% Asian, 0.2% from other races, and 1.4% from two or more races. Hispanic or Latino residents of any race were 1.3% of the population.

There were 4,201 households, of which 25.7% had children under the age of 18 living with them, 41.1% were married couples living together, 12.1% had a female householder with no husband present, 4.2% had a male householder with no wife present, and 42.6% were non-families. 34.2% of all households were made up of individuals, and 13.3% had someone living alone who was 65 years of age or older. The average household size was 2.19 and the average family size was 2.78.

The median age in the city was 40.2 years. 19.6% of residents were under the age of 18; 12.4% were between the ages of 18 and 24; 24.1% were from 25 to 44; 27.8% were from 45 to 64; and 16.2% were 65 years of age or older. The gender makeup of the city was 48.2% male and 51.8% female.

=== 2000 census ===
As of the census of 2000, there were 9,511 people, 3,963 households, and 2,464 families residing in the city. The population density was 125.6 inhabitants per square mile (48.5/km^{2}). There were 4,405 housing units at an average density of 58.2 per square mile (22.5/km^{2}). The racial makeup of the city was 95.13% White, 0.36% African American, 2.26% Native American, 0.84% Asian, 0.03% Pacific Islander, 0.17% from other races, and 1.21% from two or more races. Hispanic or Latino residents of any race were 0.65% of the population.

There were 3,963 households, out of which 28.1% had children under the age of 18 living with them, 47.8% were married couples living together, 11.0% had a female householder with no husband present, and 37.8% were non-families. 31.0% of all households were made up of individuals, and 13.7% had someone living alone who was 65 years of age or older. The average household size was 2.25 and the average family size was 2.82.

In the city, 21.6% of the population was under the age of 18, 13.1% was from 18 to 24, 27.0% from 25 to 44, 22.4% from 45 to 64, and 15.9% was 65 years of age or older. The median age was 37 years. For every 100 females, there were 91.3 males. For every 100 females age 18 and over, there were 88.2 males.

The median income for a household in the city was $29,325, and the median income for a family was $37,090. Males had a median income of $27,510 versus $19,785 for females. The per capita income for the city was $15,712. About 9.2% of families and 14.5% of the population were below the poverty line, including 16.1% of those under age 18 and 15.2% of those age 65 or over.

== Economy ==
As Aroostook County's largest city, Presque Isle is the retail center for a large number of both American and Canadian towns. The Aroostook Centre Mall became a major shopping center for residents during the 1990s. Agriculture remains a top industry of Presque Isle and the surrounding area, with potatoes being the top crop. During the winter months many local businesses rely on the snowmobiling industry as there is a highly regarded trail system connecting far away towns and cities with Presque Isle. Presque Isle is also home to a significant industrial park near the Presque Isle International Airport.

The unemployment rate in Presque Isle is typically somewhat higher than the average across Maine.

== Sports ==
Presque Isle is home to the Northern Maine Pioneers, a Tier II junior hockey team in the United States Premier Hockey League. They play their home games at The Forum.

== Media ==
=== Television ===
Presque Isle is home to one of the smallest TV markets as defined by Nielsen market research. It consists of WAGM-TV channel 8 (a CBS/Fox/CW+ affiliate), sister station WWPI-LD channel 16 (an NBC affiliate which launched on January 7, 2020), and WMEM-TV channel 10 (affiliated with the Maine Public Broadcasting Network ("Maine Public") and PBS). While not part of the Presque Isle TV market, WVII-TV, the ABC affiliate out of Bangor, Maine, airs in Presque Isle, as does NBC affiliate WLBZ.

=== Radio ===
Several radio stations have studios located in Presque Isle, including WBPW, WOZI and WQHR, all owned by Townsquare Media. The city is also home to WUPI, the University of Maine Presque Isle's student radio station which broadcasts on 91.1, originally broadcasting on 92.1. WMEM 106.1 is Maine Public's radio outlet for the area, affiliated with National Public Radio.

=== Newspaper ===
There are no daily newspapers in Aroostook County. The Presque Isle Star-Herald is published Wednesdays, one of several weekly newspapers published in Aroostook County. Others include Caribou's Aroostook Republican, Madawaska's St. John Valley Times, The Fort Fairfield Journal and Houlton's Pioneer Times. The Bangor Daily News has an Aroostook County edition.

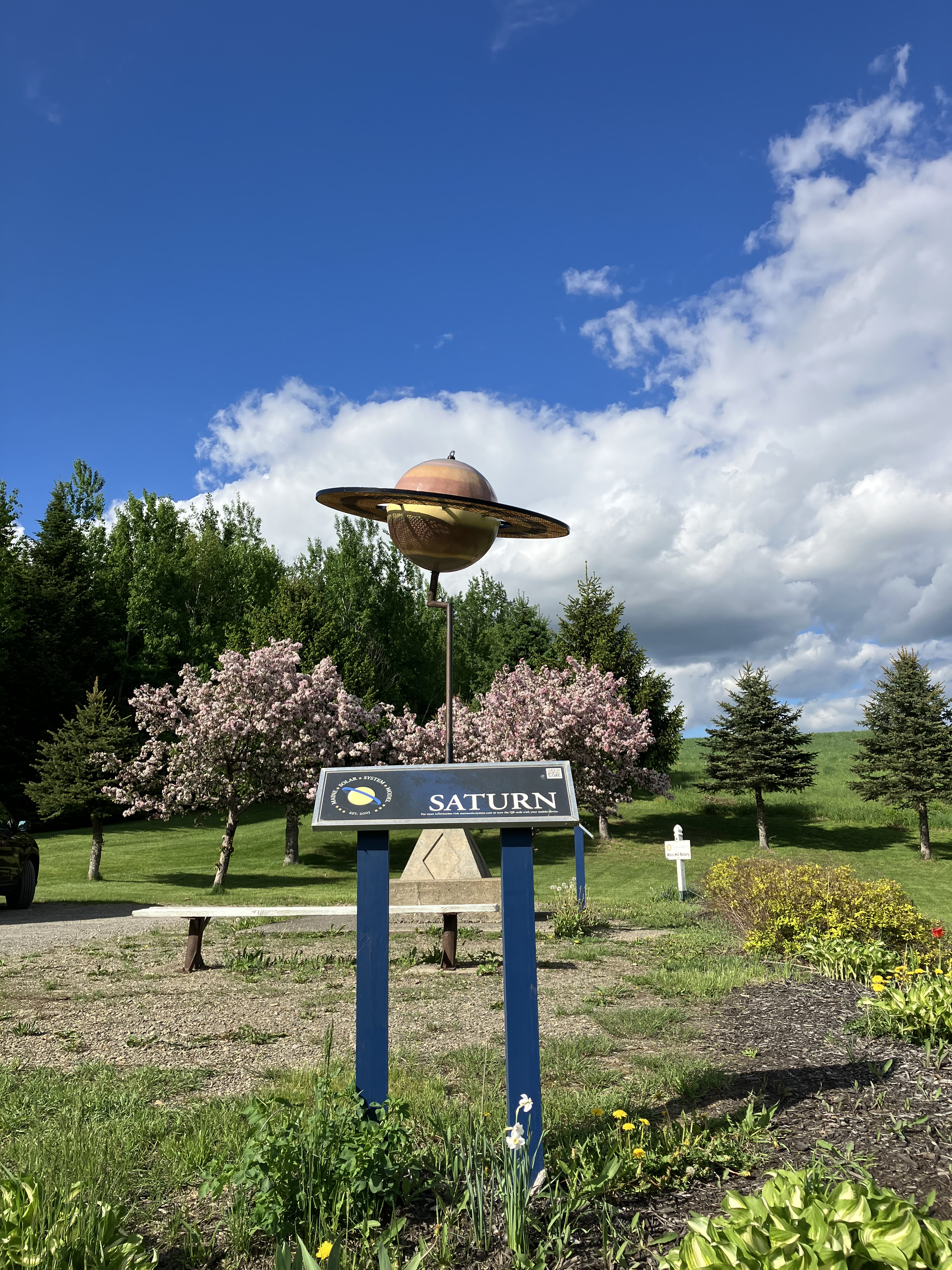
Presque Isle Solar system - Saturn

== Sites of interest ==
- Aroostook Farm
- Aroostook State Park
- Mark and Emily Turner Memorial Library
- Northern Maine Museum of Science
- Presque Isle Air Museum
- Presque Isle Historical Society & Museum
- Nordic Heritage Center and Ski Trails
- The Maine Solar System Model
- Mantle Lake Park

== Education ==
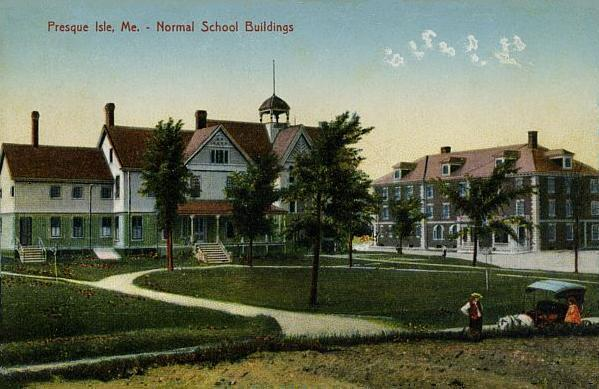
Aroostook State Normal School in 1908, now the University of Maine at Presque Isle

The school district for Presque Isle is MSAD 01 Maine School Administrative District 01. The local high school is the Presque Isle High School.

=== Colleges and universities ===
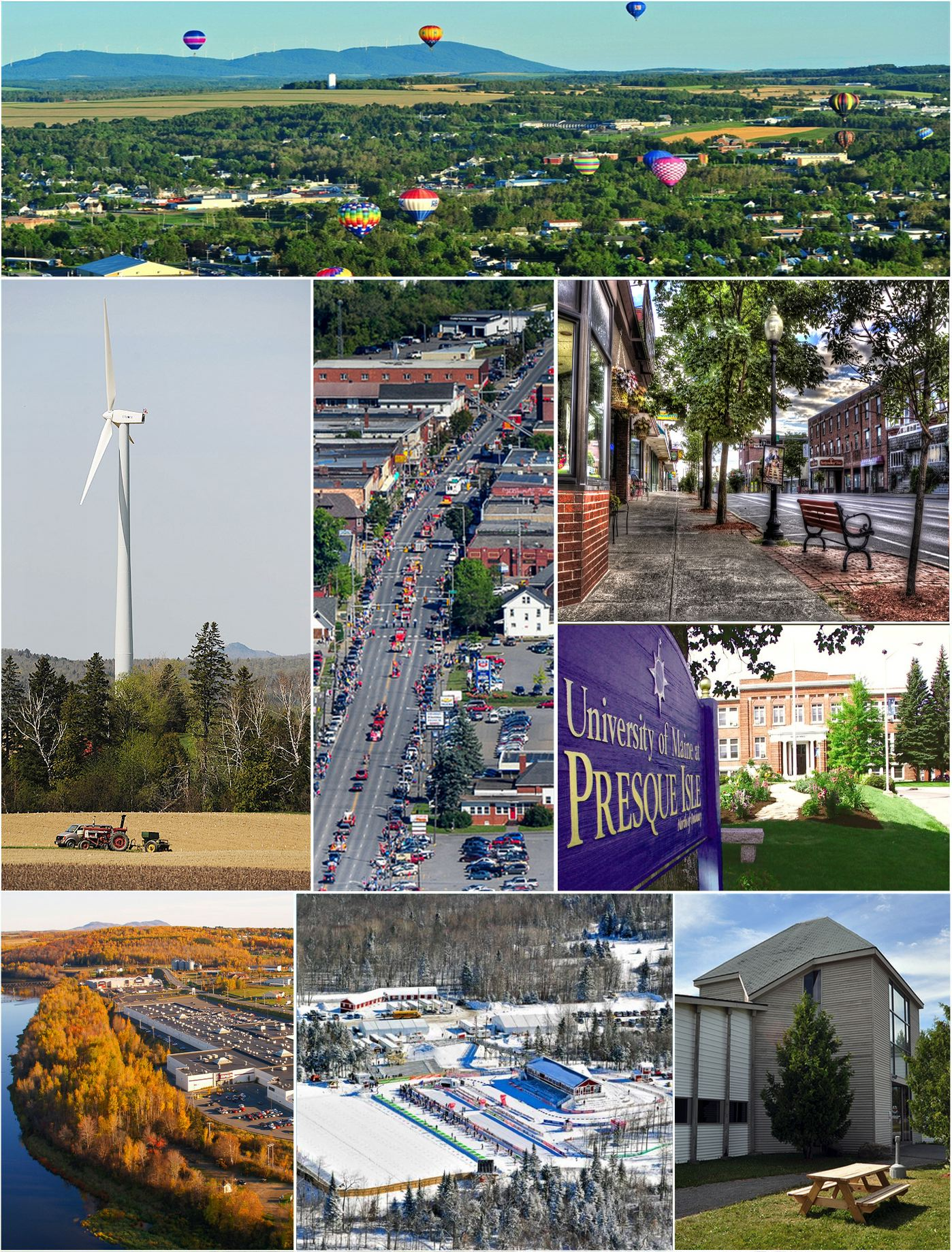
Clockwise, from top: Crown of Maine Balloon Fest in Presque Isle, Downtown, University of Maine at Presque Isle, Mi'kmaq Nation headquarters and museum, Nordic Heritage Center, Aroostook Centre Mall, UMPI wind turbine, Main Street

In 1903, the Aroostook State Normal School began offering a two-year teacher preparation program. In 1968, it was renamed the University of Maine at Presque Isle. Northern Maine Technical College was established in 1961, now Northern Maine Community College. The first students entered the college in 1963. Today it serves about 2000 students.

== In popular culture ==
Presque Isle is the focal location for operations in the 1953 film Island in the Sky.

The city is also where Handy McKay retires to open a diner in the Parker novel series by Richard Stark.

== Notable people ==
- Lucy Hayward Barker, painter
- John Cariani, actor
- John Crowley, author
- Jim Donnelly, state legislator
- James P. Dunleavy, state legislator and Aroostook County Probate Judge
- Jeremy Fischer, state legislator
- Lynn Flewelling, author
- Caroline D. Gentile, associate professor emeritus of education, University of Maine at Presque Isle
- Arthur R. Gould, businessman and U.S. Senator
- James Chico Hernandez, wrestling champion
- John Lisnik, state legislator
- Jessica McClintock, designer
- Gilda E. Nardone, women's employment advocate and nonprofit director
- Ellis Paul, musician
- Robert J. Saucier, veteran and state legislator
- Jack Sepkoski, paleontologist
- Ron Tingley, catcher for several MLB teams
- Joseph F. Underwood, state legislator
- Alexander Willette, former state legislator
- Michael Willette, former state senator
- Gerald Evan Williams, colonel; World War II Air Force pilot
