= Mark and Emily Turner Memorial Library =

Coordinates: 46.680°N 68.0141°W

Mark & Emily Turner Memorial Library
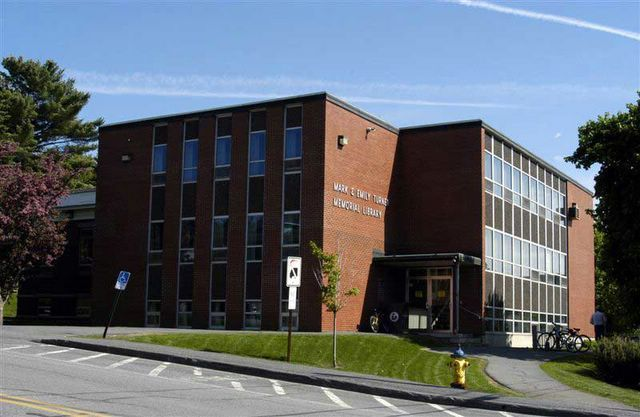
- Location: Presque Isle, Maine, United States
- Type: Public
- Established: 1908

Collection
- Size: 50,000

Access and use
- Circulation: 65,000
- Population served: 9,692

Other information
- Budget: $341,652
- Director: Sonja Plummer-Morgan
- Employees: 11

The Mark & Emily Turner Memorial Library is a public library in the city of Presque Isle, Maine, United States. The library provides resources to the city's residents including periodicals, books, audio books, computers with internet access, and wireless internet throughout the library. The library also provides passport services, maintains a library in second life, genealogical research, and provides reference services to the United States and the international community. It is named after area philanthropists Mark and Emily Turner.

== History ==
In the late 19th century, a group of citizens from Presque Isle who called themselves the Half & Half Club, created and supported their own library collection that was kept at local businesses due to the city not having a library building; with each store owner being named the local librarian. However, in the early 1900s, as the city's population began to increase, there was a demand for a permanent library structure. The town of Presque Isle applied for a gift/donation from the Andrew Carnegie Foundation; otherwise known as the Carnegie Corporation of New York. The request was granted giving the city $10,000 for the purchase of land and construction. After the initial land purchase of "$1,000 from Dudley Heirs, local citizens raised around $950 for the purchase of a smaller, adjoining plot of land". The library was opened in May 1908 under the name: Presque Isle Free Library.

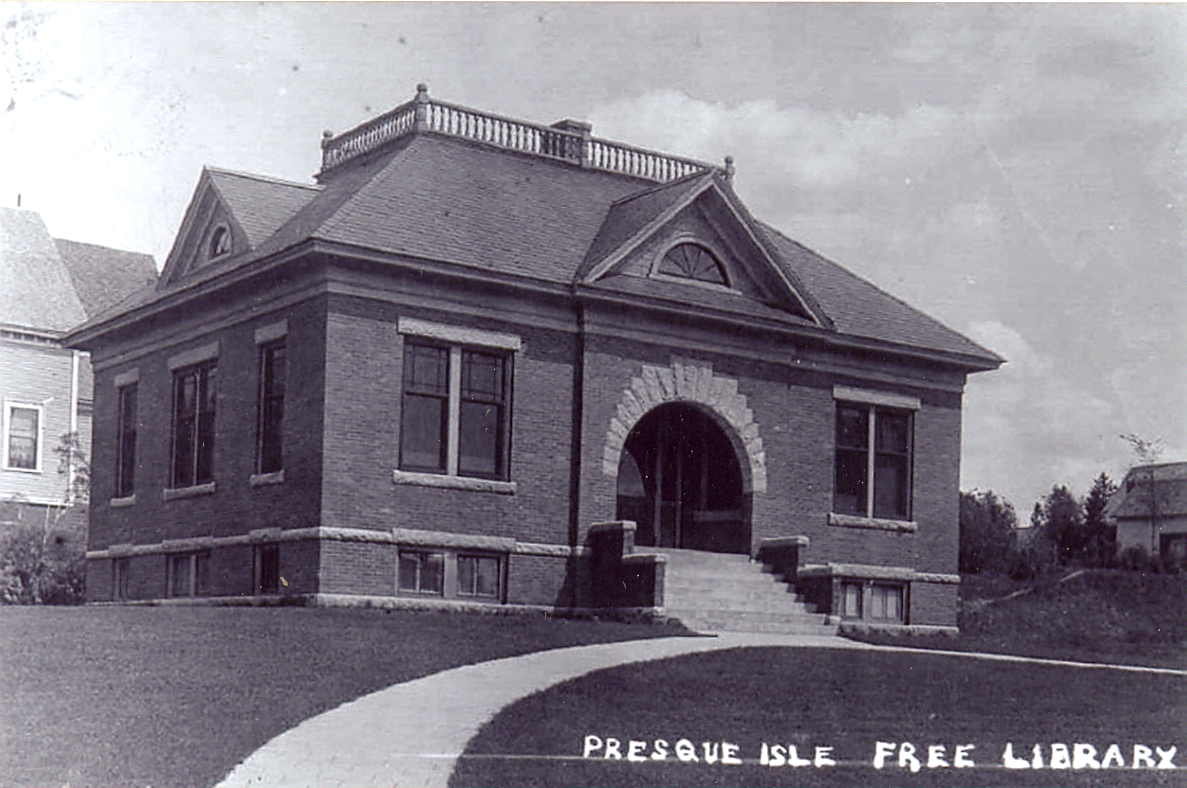
Presque Isle Free Library.

By the 1960s, overcrowding in the library had become such a problem that it was acknowledged by patrons and officials of Presque Isle that the library needed to be expanded. The initial funds given to the library for its expansion was from the government "under Title III Legislation in the amount of $60,000". A generous local philanthropist and his wife, Mark and Emily Turner, then matched the government funds donating $60,000 towards the expansion of the library. By April 1967 the library was renamed the Mark and Emily Turner Memorial Library in honor of the couple that helped finance the construction. As a token of appreciation, Mark Turner received library card number 001, the first library card given by the new library. A ribbon cutting ceremony was held and attended by Mark Turner, "Burt Tompkins, chairmen of the city council, and Bill Flora, chairman of the library board, and state governor Ken Curtis, was given a tour of the new facility".

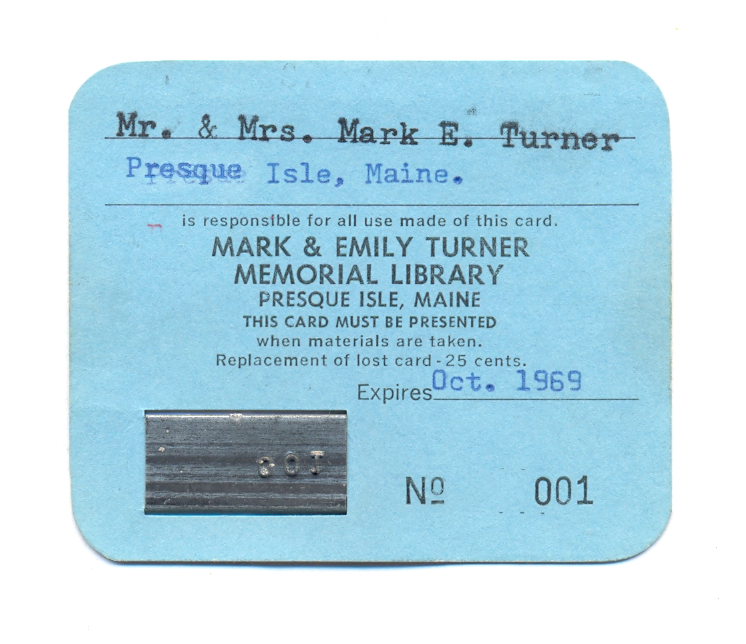
Library Card 001

The library now has a collection of over 60,000 materials including books, periodicals, databases, microfilm, and other resources.

== Genealogy services ==
The library offers genealogy services, enabling users to search for ancestors who were from Aroostook County, the State of Maine, the United States, and Canada. In-library materials include introductory materials that explains how to start and conduct a genealogical search. Other materials such as CD-ROMs, print, and microfilm are available for genealogy searches containing information such as local, state, and federal census records and existing genealogical records.

In addition to the library's resources, the library is affiliated with groups and societies including the "Maine Genealogical Society, the Aroostook County Genealogical Society, Maine Society of Mayflower Descendants, and the Maine Historical Society, among others", and can provide contact information to patrons seeking the assistance of any of its affiliated groups. The library is also joined with the Maine Memory Network, "a digital museum created through a partnership between the Maine Historical Society and the Maine State Library to increase public access and engagement with holdings of historical societies across the state".

== Notary public services ==
The Turner Memorial Library is authorized to perform Notary services in the State of Maine, such as:

- certification of affidavits
- acknowledge instruments related to real estate transfers
- certify copies of private documents
- solemnize marriages
- serve as an official state witness in connection with the forced opening of safety deposit boxes
- certify election petitions
- witness absentee voting process

== Passport services ==
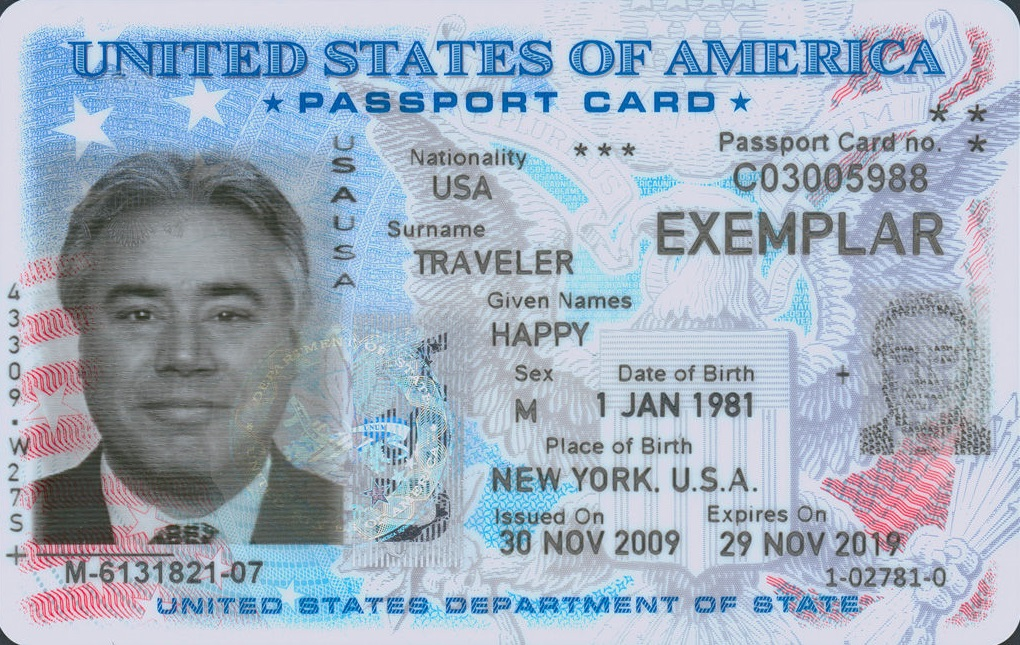
United States Passport Card.

The library, as approved by the U.S. State Department on December 28, 2007, is a passport application acceptance facility, which includes the creation of passport cards to all U.S. citizens.

== Library 2.0 services ==
Ways of contacting the Mark and Emily Turner Memorial Library for reference services include accounts in social networking web sites like Twitter, MySpace and Facebook where reference questions can be asked. Information pertaining to library hours, materials, news, and events can be found on these pages. Additional, "in cooperation with the Alliance Library System, Altarama, and Peoplewhere", the Mark and Emily Turner Memorial Library is part of a reference service called My Info Quest where a question can be texted from any mobile device and answered by a librarian from the contacted library. Other libraries from around the world participate in this form and to obtain a list of the libraries or find additional information

== Second Life ==
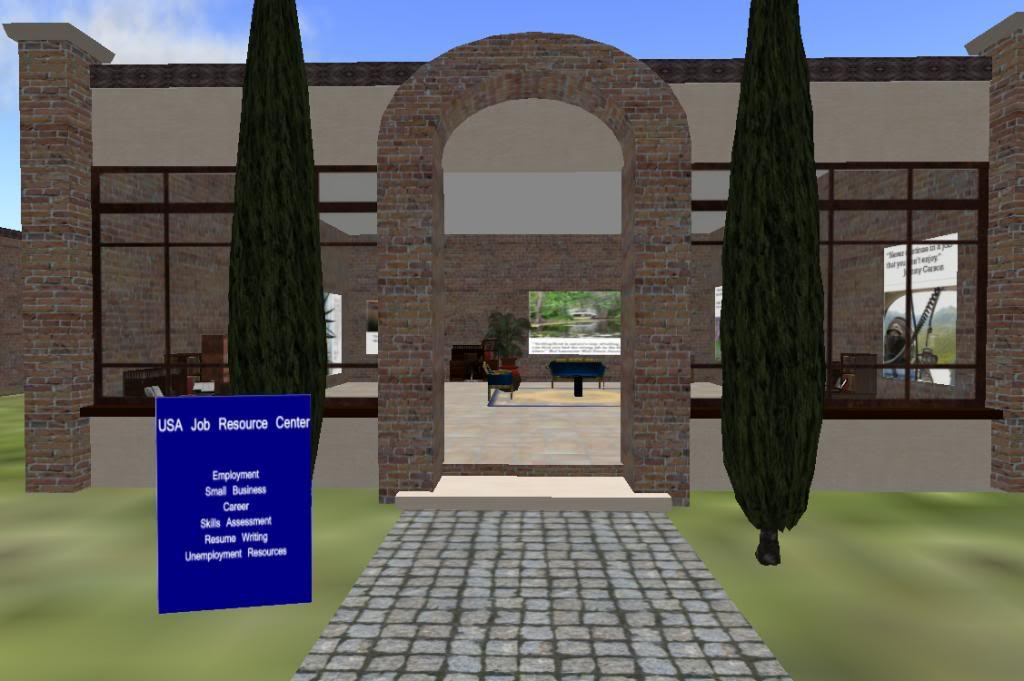
USA Jobs Resource Center in Second Life.

Through SLURL, the Mark and Emily Turner Memorial Library is available for second life services that include career and employment resources, reference library services, and links to information within second life as well as the Internet.

=== Career and employment services ===
In cooperation with Tedi Latte of the State of Maine Department of Labor's Bureau of Employment Resources, the Mark and Emily Turner Memorial library helped create the USA Jobs Resource Center of Cybrary Square. Approximately "75 percent of job seekers use the Internet", and the USA Job resource center provides a place to find employment resources in Second Life. The site's creators also hope that the "library will provide employers with the resources to better attract future workers and other libraries and agencies with a model for an in-world and online source of information" that allows people who are using online resources to fill out unemployment claims, create resumes, and complete job applications. Links to web resources are present such as ONET, "which provides information about job descriptions that includes knowledge, skills, and abilities required; as well as the average wage information and the possibility of job growth or decline", as well as links to the Workforce Investment Act, Trade Adjustment Assistance, the North American Industrial Coding System, and USA Jobs.

=== Reference services ===
In Cybrary city, at the location of the Second Life representation of the library, help with reference questions is available.

== Organization affiliations ==
The Turner Memorial Library is a member of the Maine Library Association, which provides the library with an opportunity to "promote and enhance the value of Maine libraries and librarianship, to foster cooperation between those who work in and for Maine libraries, and to provide leadership to ensure that information is accessible to all citizens from their libraries". The current library director and reference librarian are members of the Maine Library Association.

The library is a member of The Association for Rural & Small Libraries or the ARSL. The ARSL is a nationwide organization that works in order to further "positive growth and development of libraries" in rural areas.
