= Madawaska, Maine =

Town in Maine, United States

Madawaska, Maine Ville de Madawaska (French)
- Town
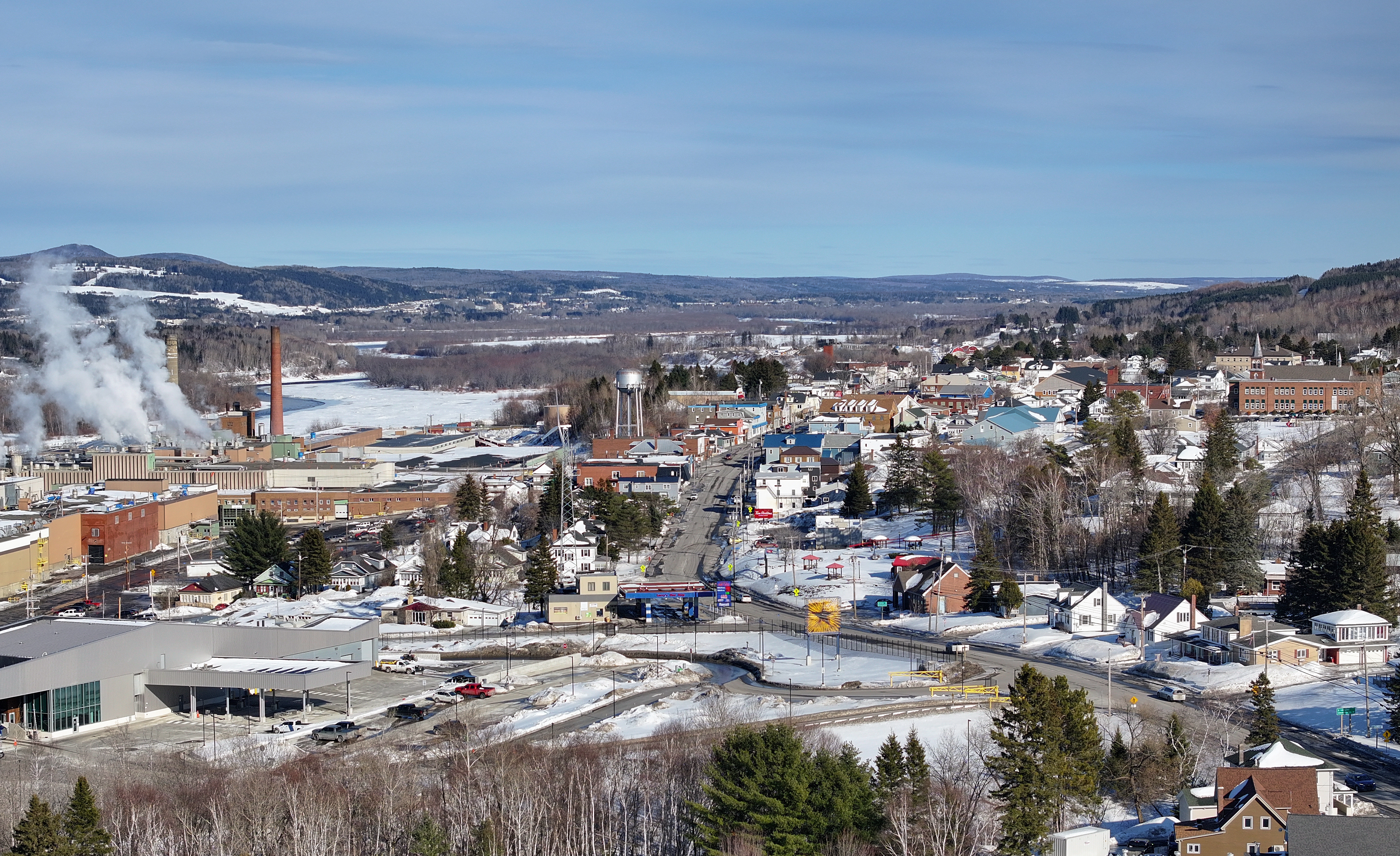
- View of Madawaska

- Flag Seal

- Location of Madawaska, Maine
- Coordinates: 47°16′25″N 68°15′18″W
- Country: United States
- State: Maine
- County: Aroostook
- Incorporated: 1869
- Villages: Madawaska; Cleveland; Fournier; Lavertue; St. David

Area
  - Total: 56.24 sq mi (145.66 km^{2})
  - Land: 55.56 sq mi (143.90 km^{2})
  - Water: 0.68 sq mi (1.76 km^{2})
- Elevation: 958 ft (292 m)

Population (2020)
  - Total: 3,867
  - Density: 70/sq mi (26.9/km^{2})
- Time zone: UTC-5 (Eastern (EST))
  - Summer (DST): UTC-4 (EDT)
- ZIP Codes: 04756 (Madawaska); 04773 (St. David)
- Area code: 207
- FIPS code: 23-42520
- GNIS feature ID: 582576
- Website: www.townofmadawaska.com

Madawaska is a town in Aroostook County, Maine, United States. The population was 3,867 at the 2020 census. Madawaska is opposite Edmundston, Madawaska County in New Brunswick, Canada, to which it is connected by the Edmundston–Madawaska Bridge over the Saint John River. According to the most recent American Community Survey data (ACS 2024 5-year estimates), up to 46.2% of the population age 5 and older speak French at home.

== History ==
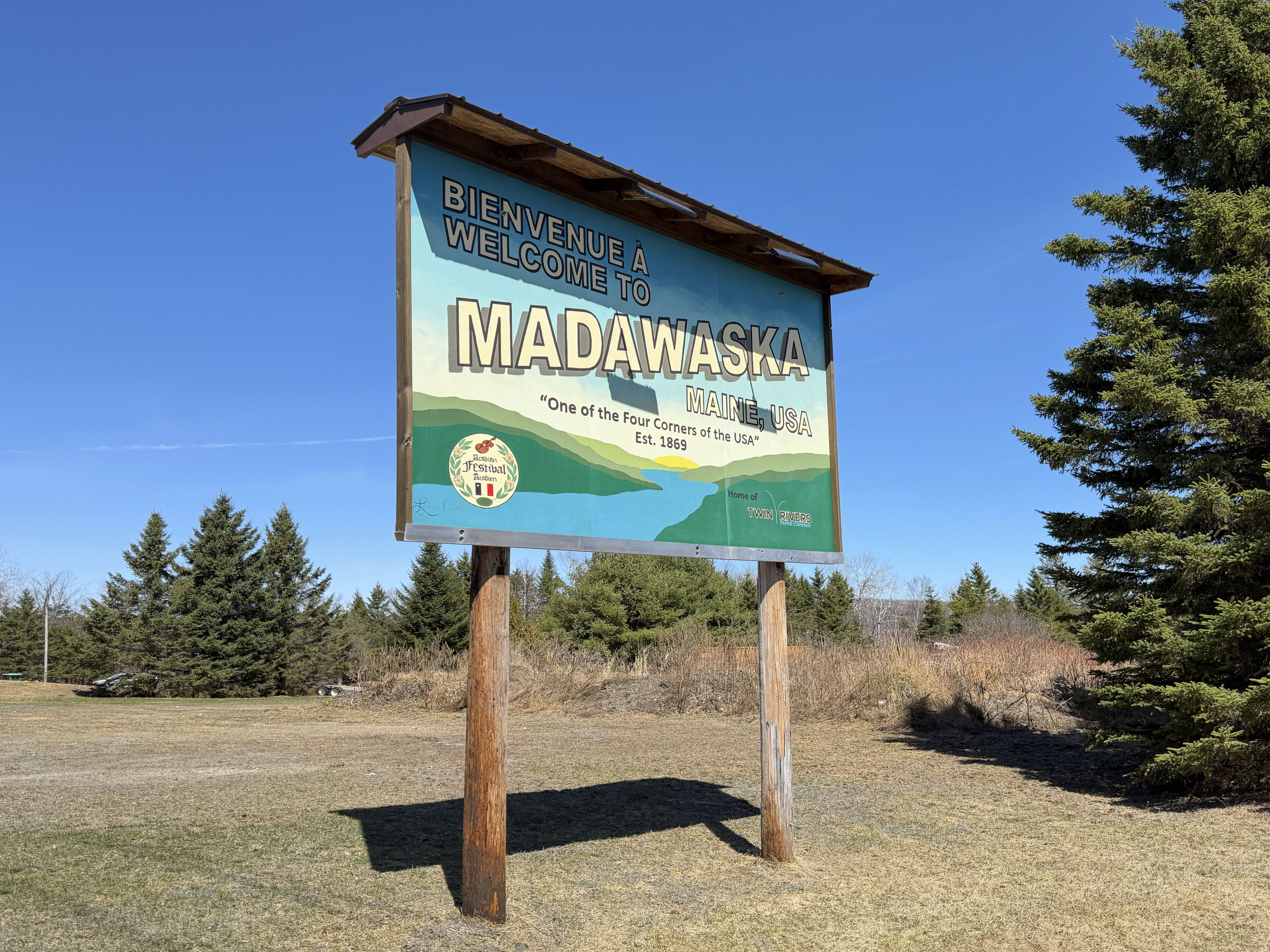
Bilingual welcome sign

During the early colonial period, Madawaska was a meeting place and hunting/fishing area for the Wolastoqiyik. Later, it was at the center of the bloodless Aroostook War. The final border between the two countries was established with the Webster–Ashburton Treaty of 1842, which gave Maine most of the disputed area, and gave the British a militarily vital connection between the province of Quebec and the province of New Brunswick. Many families were left divided after the settlement.

French used to be the most common home language in Madawaska, but French speakers were typically denied education and work opportunities, so in the 21st century it is no longer actively taught in an immersion format in local schools. However, French classes are still offered in local schools, and efforts are being made by a local organization to revive the language.

== Economy ==
Madawaska is a rural town, with the economy centered on the Saint John River paper industry. The river historically provided water power for the mills and was the route of log drives bringing pulpwood from upstream forests. The river still provides the water supply for paper manufacture, but environmental concerns encourage pulpwood delivery by highway and rail. Canadian corporation Twin Rivers (originally Fraser Papers) has a large facility located in Madawaska which processes the pulp produced by the mill's other plant in Edmundston. The pulp is shipped across the border through a mile-long high pressure pipeline running between both facilities, and is made into paper in Madawaska. The Madawaska mill specializes in fine-grade papers. The town's economy is highly dependent upon cross-border trade, to the extent that residents of Madawaska, and its larger sister city of Edmundston, consider it a single economic entity in many aspects.

Madawaska is also home to the St. John Valley Times, a popular weekly newspaper circulated across Aroostook County.

== Geography ==
According to the United States Census Bureau, the town has a total area of 56.24 square miles (145.66 km^{2}), of which 55.56 square miles (143.90 km^{2}) is land and 0.68 square miles (1.76 km^{2}) is water. Madawaska is located beside the Saint John River, the Canada–United States border. Four Corners Park commemorates its location as the most northeastern town in the contiguous United States. The town is served by U.S. Route 1.

=== Climate ===
This climatic region is typified by large seasonal temperature differences, with warm to hot (and often humid) summers and cold (sometimes severely cold) winters. According to the Köppen Climate Classification system, Madawaska has a humid continental climate, abbreviated "Dfb" on climate maps.

Climate data for Edmundston, New Brunswick, 1991–2020 normals, extremes 1913–present
Month	Jan	Feb	Mar	Apr	May	Jun	Jul	Aug	Sep	Oct	Nov	Dec	Year
Record high humidex	12.2	10.4	26.0	26.7	39.3	40.4	42.8	39.3	39.0	32.6	23.8	17.2	42.8
Record high °C (°F)	13.0 (55.4)	15.0 (59.0)	25.0 (77.0)	28.0 (82.4)	34.5 (94.1)	37.2 (99.0)	36.1 (97.0)	35.6 (96.1)	33.6 (92.5)	30.6 (87.1)	23.3 (73.9)	15.6 (60.1)	37.2 (99.0)
Mean daily maximum °C (°F)	−6.9 (19.6)	−4.8 (23.4)	1.2 (34.2)	8.5 (47.3)	17.2 (63.0)	22.1 (71.8)	25.0 (77.0)	24.1 (75.4)	19.2 (66.6)	11.5 (52.7)	4.0 (39.2)	−2.8 (27.0)	9.9 (49.8)
Daily mean °C (°F)	−13.0 (8.6)	−11.8 (10.8)	−5.5 (22.1)	2.4 (36.3)	10.1 (50.2)	15.0 (59.0)	18.1 (64.6)	17.0 (62.6)	12.3 (54.1)	5.8 (42.4)	−0.5 (31.1)	−7.7 (18.1)	3.5 (38.3)
Mean daily minimum °C (°F)	−19.1 (−2.4)	−18.7 (−1.7)	−11.9 (10.6)	−3.6 (25.5)	2.9 (37.2)	7.8 (46.0)	11.0 (51.8)	9.8 (49.6)	5.3 (41.5)	0.2 (32.4)	−4.9 (23.2)	−12.5 (9.5)	−2.8 (27.0)
Record low °C (°F)	−43.6 (−46.5)	−39.4 (−38.9)	−36.2 (−33.2)	−28.5 (−19.3)	−9.4 (15.1)	−4.4 (24.1)	1.3 (34.3)	−1.2 (29.8)	−6.6 (20.1)	−16.1 (3.0)	−26.0 (−14.8)	−40.0 (−40.0)	−43.6 (−46.5)
Record low wind chill	−48.8	−47.3	−39.0	−29.6	−7.6	−3.8	0.0	0.0	−7.2	−13.9	−25.3	−42.0	−48.8
Average precipitation mm (inches)	71.1 (2.80)	63.2 (2.49)	64.1 (2.52)	67.0 (2.64)	84.6 (3.33)	101.1 (3.98)	106.6 (4.20)	86.4 (3.40)	89.4 (3.52)	102.7 (4.04)	86.9 (3.42)	88.6 (3.49)	1,011.8 (39.83)
Average rainfall mm (inches)	12.7 (0.50)	9.1 (0.36)	17.0 (0.67)	46.7 (1.84)	90.0 (3.54)	97.4 (3.83)	113.8 (4.48)	93.4 (3.68)	94.6 (3.72)	90.8 (3.57)	64.7 (2.55)	22.9 (0.90)	753.0 (29.65)
Average snowfall cm (inches)	66.7 (26.3)	53.2 (20.9)	39.1 (15.4)	11.5 (4.5)	0.4 (0.2)	0.0 (0.0)	0.0 (0.0)	0.0 (0.0)	0.0 (0.0)	2.8 (1.1)	26.5 (10.4)	57.8 (22.8)	258.0 (101.6)
Average precipitation days (≥ 0.2 mm)	13.2	13.4	12.4	12.0	13.0	13.4	14.4	13.2	12.8	14.7	13.0	14.7	160.2
Average rainy days (≥ 0.2 mm)	1.5	1.2	3.0	7.6	11.8	12.1	12.2	11.3	11.2	11.9	7.8	2.7	94.4
Average snowy days (≥ 0.2 cm)	8.7	7.7	5.6	2.2	0.14	0.0	0.0	0.0	0.0	0.59	4.5	8.4	37.9
Source: Environment Canada (rain, snow 1981–2010)

== Demographics ==
Historical population
Census	Pop.	Note	%±
1820	1,114		—
1830	2,487		123.2%
1840	3,460		39.1%
1850	1,276		−63.1%
1860	585		−54.2%
1870	1,041		77.9%
1880	1,391		33.6%
1890	1,451		4.3%
1900	1,698		17.0%
1910	1,831		7.8%
1920	1,933		5.6%
1930	3,533		82.8%
1940	4,477		26.7%
1950	4,900		9.4%
1960	5,507		12.4%
1970	5,585		1.4%
1980	5,282		−5.4%
1990	4,803		−9.1%
2000	4,534		−5.6%
2010	4,035		−11.0%
2020	3,867		−4.2%
U.S. Decennial Census

Madawaska town, Maine – Racial composition Note: the US Census treats Hispanic/Latino as an ethnic category. This table excludes Latinos from the racial categories and assigns them to a separate category. Hispanics/Latinos may be of any race.
Race (NH = Non-Hispanic)	% 2020	% 2010	% 2000	Pop 2020	Pop 2010	Pop 2000
White alone (NH)	94.9%	98.1%	98%	3,671	3,959	4,442
Black alone (NH)	0.2%	0.1%	0.2%	7	4	7
American Indian alone (NH)	0.4%	0.5%	0.4%	14	20	20
Asian alone (NH)	0.5%	0.2%	0.7%	19	8	31
Pacific Islander alone (NH)	0%	0%	0%	0	0	0
Other race alone (NH)	0.3%	0%	0%	13	1	0
Multiracial (NH)	2.4%	0.6%	0.6%	94	23	25
Hispanic/Latino (any race)	1.3%	0.5%	0.2%	49	20	9

=== 2010 census ===
As of the census of 2010, there were 4,035 people, 1,983 households, and 1,128 families living in the town. The population density was 72.6 inhabitants per square mile (28.0/km^{2}). There were 2,398 housing units at an average density of 43.2 per square mile (16.7/km^{2}). The racial makeup of the town was 98.4% White, 0.2% African American, 0.5% Native American, 0.2% Asian, and 0.6% from two or more races. Hispanic or Latino of any race were 0.5% of the population.

There were 1,983 households, of which 20.1% had children under the age of 18 living with them, 47.2% were married couples living together, 6.5% had a female householder with no husband present, 3.2% had a male householder with no wife present, and 43.1% were non-families. 38.8% of all households were made up of individuals, and 19.6% had someone living alone who was 65 years of age or older. The average household size was 2.00 and the average family size was 2.62.

The median age in the town was 51.2 years. 16.7% of residents were under the age of 18; 4.4% were between the ages of 18 and 24; 18.5% were from 25 to 44; 34.1% were from 45 to 64; and 26.2% were 65 years of age or older. The gender makeup of the town was 49.1% male and 50.9% female.

=== 2000 census ===
Languages (2000)	Percent
Spoke French at home	83.41%
Spoke English at home	16.59%

As of the census of 2000, there were 4,534 people, 1,993 households, and 1,301 families living in the town. The population density was 81.5 inhabitants per square mile (31.5/km^{2}). There were 2,362 housing units at an average density of 42.4 per square mile (16.4/km^{2}). The racial makeup of the town was 98.08% White, 0.15% Black, 0.44% Native American, 0.68% Asian, 0.09% from other races, and 0.55% from two or more races. Hispanic or Latino of any race were 0.20% of the population.

There were 1,993 households, out of which 26.0% had children under the age of 18 living with them, 56.8% were married couples living together, 6.0% had a female householder with no husband present, and 34.7% were non-families. 30.8% of all households were made up of individuals, and 13.2% had someone living alone who was 65 years of age or older. The average household size was 2.22 and the average family size was 2.77.

In the town, the population was spread out, with 20.4% under the age of 18, 5.2% from 18 to 24, 25.3% from 25 to 44, 30.1% from 45 to 64, and 19.0% who were 65 years of age or older. The median age was 44 years. For every 100 females, there were 91.3 males. For every 100 females age 18 and over, there were 91.1 males.

The median income for a household in the town was $30,994, and the median income for a family was $42,269. Males had a median income of $46,117 versus $22,361 for females. The per capita income for the town was $18,552. About 7.5% of families and 11.5% of the population were below the poverty line, including 13.9% of those under age 18 and 11.8% of those age 65 or over. The median home value is $102,935.

== Education ==
It is in the Madawaska School District. Madawaska's schools serve Madawaska, St. David, and Grand Isle. The Madawaska Elementary School has students from pre-kindergarten through the sixth grade. Madawaska Middle/High School contains grades seven through 12.

== Notable people ==
- Roger Albert, Maine state legislator
- Ashley Hebert, The Bachelorette Season 7
- Emilien Levesque, Maine state legislator
- Andy Palmer, distance runner and coach
- Charles Theriault, Maine state legislator
- Roland White, bluegrass musician

== See also ==
- French language in the United States
