= St. John Valley Times =

Weekly newspaper in Maine, US, from 1957

- Type: Weekly newspaper
- Owner(s): Bangor Publishing Company
- Founder(s): Joseph J. Falter
- Founded: October 1957
- City: Madawaska, Maine
- Circulation: 6,000

The St. John Valley Times is a weekly newspaper based in Madawaska, Maine. It was founded in October 1957 by Joseph J. Falter.

St. John Valley Times circulates approximately 6,000 copies per week. The paper is distributed on Wednesdays to the residents of the St. John Valley, a large area in Maine located along the Saint John River, and Aroostook County. Because the residents of the St. John Valley are largely a population of Acadian and Québec descent, the publisher prints some articles and editorials in both French and English. St. John Valley Times also provides other services including custom printing in their in-house print shop. The St. John Valley Times celebrated its 50th anniversary in 2007.

The St. John Valley Times was acquired by the Bangor Publishing Company, owner of the Bangor Daily News, from Walls Newspapers of Birmingham, Alabama, in 2015.
