= Grand Isle, Maine =

Town in Maine, United States

Grand Isle, Maine Grande Île
- Town
- Location of Grand Isle, Maine
- Coordinates: 47°14′54″N 68°07′39″W
- Country: United States
- State: Maine
- County: Aroostook
- Villages: Grand Isle; Lille; Notre Dame

Area
  - Total: 35.38 sq mi (91.63 km^{2})
  - Land: 34.59 sq mi (89.59 km^{2})
  - Water: 0.79 sq mi (2.05 km^{2})
- Elevation: 653 ft (199 m)

Population (2020)
  - Total: 366
  - Density: 11/sq mi (4.1/km^{2})
- Time zone: UTC-5 (Eastern (EST))
  - Summer (DST): UTC-4 (EDT)
- ZIP code: 04746
- Area code: 207
- FIPS code: 23-28590
- GNIS feature ID: 582495
- Website: grandislemaine.com

Grand Isle (French: Grande Île) is a town in Aroostook County, Maine, United States. The population was 366 at the 2020 census. The village of Grand Isle is in the northwestern part of the town.

According to the most recent American Community Survey data, up to 57.9% of the population age 5 and older speak French at home.

== Etymology ==
Grand Isle takes its name from an island located in the Saint John River near the town center.

== Geography ==
According to the United States Census Bureau, the town has a total area of 35.38 square miles (91.63 km^{2}), of which 34.59 square miles (89.59 km^{2}) is land and 0.79 square miles (2.05 km^{2}) is water.

== Demographics ==
Historical population
Census	Pop.	Note	%±
1860	545		—
1870	688		26.2%
1880	847		23.1%
1890	964		13.8%
1900	1,104		14.5%
1910	1,317		19.3%
1920	1,352		2.7%
1930	1,408		4.1%
1940	1,574		11.8%
1950	1,230		−21.9%
1960	978		−20.5%
1970	797		−18.5%
1980	719		−9.8%
1990	558		−22.4%
2000	518		−7.2%
2010	467		−9.8%
2020	366		−21.6%
U.S. Decennial Census

=== 2010 census ===
As of the census of 2010, there were 467 people, 215 households, and 135 families living in the town. The population density was 13.5 inhabitants per square mile (5.2/km^{2}). There were 262 housing units at an average density of 7.6 units per square mile (2.9 units/km^{2}). The racial makeup of the town was 98.5% White, 0.4% African American, 0.4% Native American, and 0.6% from two or more races.

There were 215 households, of which 20.5% had children under the age of 18 living with them, 52.1% were married couples living together, 5.1% had a female householder with no husband present, 5.6% had a male householder with no wife present, and 37.2% were non-families. 30.2% of all households were made up of individuals, and 13% had someone living alone who was 65 years of age or older. The average household size was 2.15 and the average family size was 2.66.

The median age in the town was 49.3 years. 16.9% of residents were under the age of 18; 4.5% were between the ages of 18 and 24; 19.1% were from 25 to 44; 33.8% were from 45 to 64; and 25.7% were 65 years of age or older. The gender makeup of the town was 51.2% male and 48.8% female.

=== 2000 census ===
Languages (2000)	Percent
Spoke French at home	76.72%
Spoke English at home	23.28%

As of the census of 2000, there were 518 people, 218 households, and 161 families living in the town. The population density was 15.1 inhabitants per square mile (5.8/km^{2}). There were 268 housing units at an average density of 7.8 units per square mile (3.0 units/km^{2}). The racial makeup of the town was 98.84% White, 0.39% Native American, 0.19% Asian, and 0.58% from two or more races. Hispanic or Latino of any race were 0.39% of the population. Grande Isle is one of several American communities in Northern Maine with a French-speaking majority, with over 75% of the households reporting in 2000 that French is spoken at home.

There were 218 households, out of which 23.4% had children under the age of 18 living with them, 63.3% were married couples living together, 6.0% had a female householder with no husband present, and 25.7% were non-families. 22.0% of all households were made up of individuals, and 11.5% had someone living alone who was 65 years of age or older. The average household size was 2.38 and the average family size was 2.72.

In the town, the population was spread out, with 20.8% under the age of 18, 4.6% from 18 to 24, 17.6% from 25 to 44, 37.6% from 45 to 64, and 19.3% who were 65 years of age or older. The median age was 49 years. For every 100 females, there were 95.5 males. For every 100 females age 18 and over, there were 96.2 males.

The median income for a household in the town was $28,125, and the median income for a family was $34,875. Males had a median income of $40,000 versus $30,938 for females. The per capita income for the town was $13,346. About 12.7% of families and 17.4% of the population were below the poverty line, including 32.1% of those under age 18 and 9.2% of those age 65 or over.

== Notable people ==
- Emilien Levesque (1922–2003), congressman from Maine; born in Grand Isle
- Roger Parent (born 1938 or 1939), former mayor of South Bend, IN (1980-1988); born and raised in Grand Isle
