= Madawaska (CDP), Maine =

Madawaska, Maine
- Census-designated place
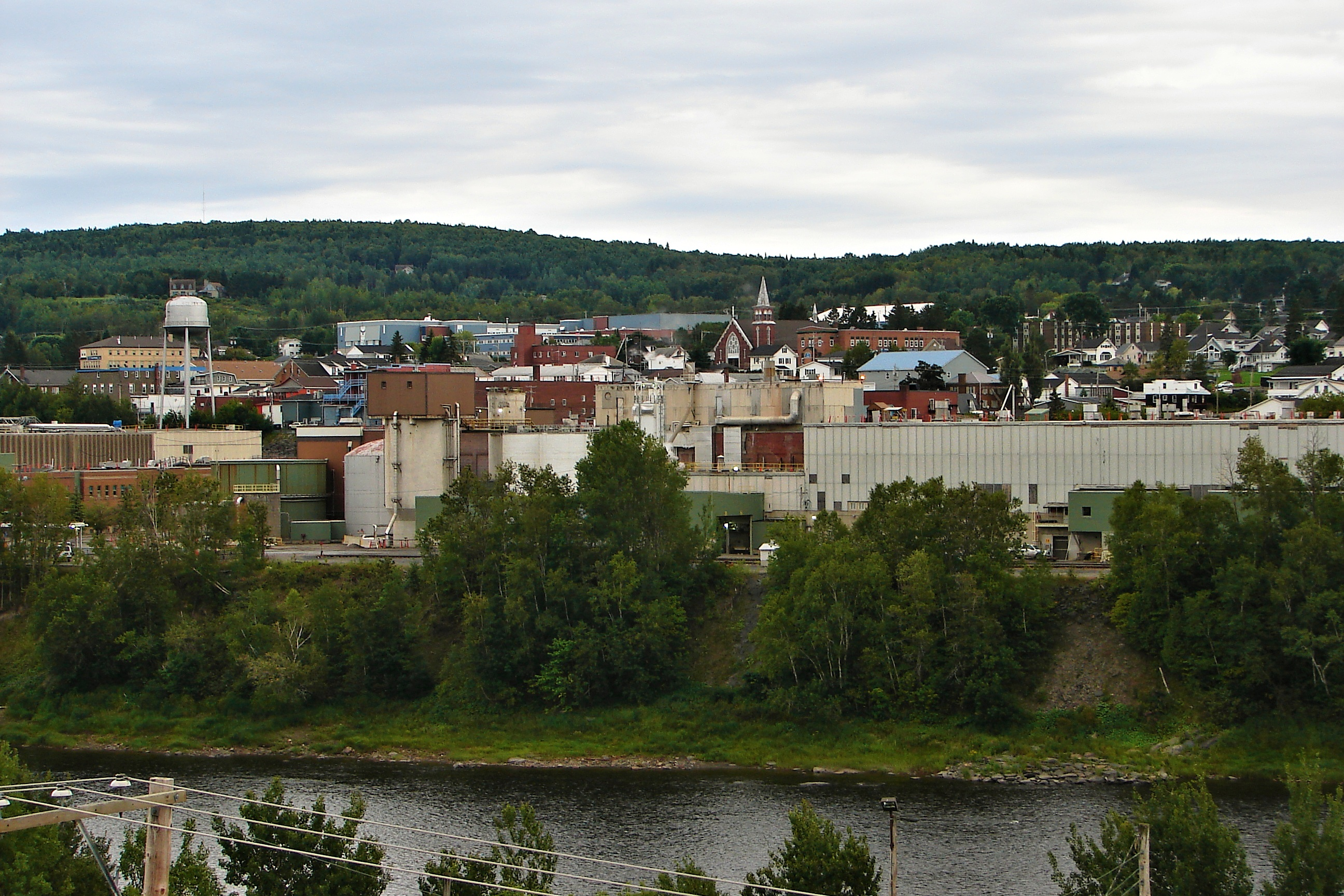
- View of Madawaska

- Location of Madawaska, Maine
- Coordinates: 47°20′35″N 68°19′51″W
- Country: United States
- State: Maine
- County: Aroostook
- Town: Madawaska

Area
  - Total: 5.39 sq mi (13.97 km^{2})
  - Land: 5.29 sq mi (13.70 km^{2})
  - Water: 0.10 sq mi (0.26 km^{2})
- Elevation: 699 ft (213 m)

Population (2020)
  - Total: 2,797
  - Density: 528.6/sq mi (204.09/km^{2})
- Time zone: UTC-5 (Eastern (EST))
  - Summer (DST): UTC-4 (EDT)
- ZIP code: 04756
- Area code: 207
- FIPS code: 23-42485
- GNIS feature ID: 2377932

Madawaska is a census-designated place (CDP) comprising the main village within the town of Madawaska in Aroostook County, Maine, United States. The population of the CDP was 2,967 at the 2010 census, out of a population of 4,035 for the entire town.

== Geography ==
The Madawaska CDP is located in the northwestern corner of the town of Madawaska. The Saint John River forms the northern edge of the CDP as well as the Canada–United States border. U.S. Route 1 runs east–west through the center of the CDP, leading 19 miles (31 km) southwest (officially northbound) to Fort Kent, the highway's northern terminus, and 47 miles (76 km) southeast (southbound) to Caribou. A bridge across the Saint John River connects Madawaska with the city of Edmundston, New Brunswick, Canada. The Madawaska River of New Brunswick joins the Saint John River just east (downstream) of the international bridge.

According to the United States Census Bureau, the Madawaska CDP has a total area of 5.4 square miles (14.0 km^{2}), of which 5.3 square miles (13.7 km^{2}) is land and 0.12 square miles (0.3 km^{2}), or 1.89%, is water.

== Demographics ==
Historical population
Census	Pop.	Note	%±
1960	4,035		—
1970	4,452		10.3%
1980	4,165		−6.4%
1990	3,653		−12.3%
2000	3,326		−9.0%
2010	2,967		−10.8%
2020	2,797		−5.7%
U.S. Decennial Census

Languages (2000)	Percent
Spoke French at home	83.54%
Spoke English at home	16.46%

The most reported ancestries in 2020 were:

- French (32.2%)
- English (24.8%)
- French Canadian (8%)
- Irish (5.6%)
- German (2.9%)
- Canadian (2.2%)
- Scottish (1.5%)
- Italian (1.1%)

As of the census of 2000, there were 3,326 people, 1,523 households, and 927 families residing in the CDP. The population density was 629.8 inhabitants per square mile (243.2/km^{2}). There were 1,667 housing units at an average density of 315.7 per square mile (121.9/km^{2}). The racial makeup of the CDP was 98.11% White, 0.09% Black or African American, 0.51% Native American, 0.66% Asian, 0.12% from other races, and 0.51% from two or more races. Hispanic or Latino of any race were 0.18% of the population.

There were 1,523 households, out of which 23.1% had children under the age of 18 living with them, 52.7% were married couples living together, 6.3% had a female householder with no husband present, and 39.1% were non-families. 35.5% of all households were made up of individuals, and 16.0% had someone living alone who was 65 years of age or older. The average household size was 2.11 and the average family size was 2.73.

In the CDP, the population was spread out, with 18.7% under the age of 18, 5.3% from 18 to 24, 23.7% from 25 to 44, 30.4% from 45 to 64, and 21.9% who were 65 years of age or older. The median age was 46 years. For every 100 females, there were 86.4 males. For every 100 females age 18 and over, there were 85.3 males.

The median income for a household in the CDP was $30,605, and the median income for a family was $43,287. Males had a median income of $47,429 versus $23,233 for females. The per capita income for the CDP was $17,657. About 4.4% of families and 9.1% of the population were below the poverty line, including 7.8% of those under age 18 and 12.6% of those age 65 or over.
