= Chapman, Maine =

Town in the state of Maine, England

- Town
- Location of Chapman, Maine
- Coordinates: 46°36′52″N 68°06′45″W
- Country: United States
- State: Maine
- County: Aroostook

Area
  - Total: 38.82 sq mi (100.54 km^{2})
  - Land: 38.40 sq mi (99.46 km^{2})
  - Water: 0.42 sq mi (1.09 km^{2})
- Elevation: 610 ft (190 m)

Population (2020)
  - Total: 491
  - Density: 13/sq mi (4.9/km^{2})
- Time zone: UTC-5 (Eastern (EST))
  - Summer (DST): UTC-4 (EDT)
- ZIP code: 04757
- Area code: 207
- FIPS code: 23-12000
- GNIS feature ID: 582403
- Website: mapleton.me

Chapman is a town in Aroostook County, Maine, United States. The population was 491 at the 2020 census.

== Geography ==
According to the United States Census Bureau, the town has a total area of 38.82 square miles (100.54 km^{2}), of which 38.40 square miles (99.46 km^{2}) is land and 0.42 square miles (1.09 km^{2}) is water.

== Demographics ==
Historical population
Census	Pop.	Note	%±
1880	166		—
1890	231		39.2%
1900	285		23.4%
1910	426		49.5%
1920	490		15.0%
1930	409		−16.5%
1940	397		−2.9%
1950	381		−4.0%
1960	376		−1.3%
1970	328		−12.8%
1980	406		23.8%
1990	422		3.9%
2000	465		10.2%
2010	468		0.6%
2020	491		4.9%
U.S. Decennial Census

=== 2010 census ===
As of the census of 2010, there were 468 people, 194 households, and 139 families living in the town. The population density was 12.2 inhabitants per square mile (4.7/km^{2}). There were 213 housing units at an average density of 5.5 per square mile (2.1/km^{2}). The racial makeup of the town was 98.9% White, 0.6% Native American, and 0.4% from two or more races.

There were 194 households, of which 28.9% had children under the age of 18 living with them, 59.3% were married couples living together, 7.2% had a female householder with no husband present, 5.2% had a male householder with no wife present, and 28.4% were non-families. 20.6% of all households were made up of individuals, and 6.7% had someone living alone who was 65 years of age or older. The average household size was 2.41 and the average family size was 2.78.

The median age in the town was 42.4 years. 22% of residents were under the age of 18; 6.9% were between the ages of 18 and 24; 26.7% were from 25 to 44; 31.1% were from 45 to 64; and 13.2% were 65 years of age or older. The gender makeup of the town was 51.3% male and 48.7% female.

=== 2000 census ===
As of the census of 2000, there were 465 people, 177 households, and 144 families living in the town. The population density was 12.1 inhabitants per square mile (4.7/km^{2}). There were 189 housing units at an average density of 4.9 per square mile (1.9/km^{2}). The racial makeup of the town was 96.99% White, 0.22% African American, 2.15% Native American, and 0.65% from two or more races.

There were 177 households, out of which 35.0% had children under the age of 18 living with them, 74.0% were married couples living together, 4.0% had a female householder with no husband present, and 18.6% were non-families. 15.8% of all households were made up of individuals, and 5.6% had someone living alone who was 65 years of age or older. The average household size was 2.63 and the average family size was 2.92.

In the town, the population was spread out, with 24.1% under the age of 18, 5.8% from 18 to 24, 31.0% from 25 to 44, 27.5% from 45 to 64, and 11.6% who were 65 years of age or older. The median age was 38 years. For every 100 females, there were 97.9 males. For every 100 females age 18 and over, there were 97.2 males.

The median income for a household in the town was $37,500, and the median income for a family was $43,542. Males had a median income of $28,375 versus $25,000 for females. The per capita income for the town was $16,008. About 5.0% of families and 8.8% of the population were below the poverty line, including 11.3% of those under age 18 and 11.3% of those age 65 or over.
