= Castle Hill, Maine =

Town in Maine, United States

- Town
- Location of Castle Hill, Maine
- Coordinates: 46°42′08″N 68°15′22″W
- Country: United States
- State: Maine
- County: Aroostook

Area
  - Total: 36.15 sq mi (93.63 km^{2})
  - Land: 35.69 sq mi (92.44 km^{2})
  - Water: 0.46 sq mi (1.19 km^{2})
- Elevation: 869 ft (265 m)

Population (2020)
  - Total: 373
  - Density: 10/sq mi (4/km^{2})
- Time zone: UTC-5 (Eastern (EST))
  - Summer (DST): UTC-4 (EDT)
- ZIP code: 04757
- Area code: 207
- FIPS code: 23-11300
- GNIS feature ID: 582397
- Website: mapleton.me

Castle Hill is a town in Aroostook County, Maine, United States. The population was 373 people at the 2020 census.

== Geography ==
According to the United States Census Bureau, the town has a total area of 36.15 square miles (93.63 km^{2}), of which 35.69 square miles (92.44 km^{2}) is land and 0.46 square miles (1.19 km^{2}) is water.

== Demographics ==
Historical population
Census	Pop.	Note	%±
1870	237		—
1880	419		76.8%
1890	537		28.2%
1900	567		5.6%
1910	532		−6.2%
1920	571		7.3%
1930	617		8.1%
1940	697		13.0%
1950	581		−16.6%
1960	554		−4.6%
1970	519		−6.3%
1980	509		−1.9%
1990	449		−11.8%
2000	454		1.1%
2010	425		−6.4%
2020	373		−12.2%
U.S. Decennial Census

=== 2010 census ===
As of the census of 2010, there were 425 people, 181 households, and 127 families living in the town. The population density was 11.9 inhabitants per square mile (4.6/km^{2}). There were 211 housing units at an average density of 5.9 per square mile (2.3/km^{2}). The racial makeup of the town was 98.6% White, 0.2% African American, 0.7% Native American, and 0.5% from two or more races. Hispanic or Latino of any race were 0.7% of the population.

There were 181 households, of which 23.2% had children under the age of 18 living with them, 61.9% were married couples living together, 6.1% had a female householder with no husband present, 2.2% had a male householder with no wife present, and 29.8% were non-families. 21.5% of all households were made up of individuals, and 6.1% had someone living alone who was 65 years of age or older. The average household size was 2.35 and the average family size was 2.72.

The median age in the town was 48.4 years. 16.5% of residents were under the age of 18; 7.2% were between the ages of 18 and 24; 21.4% were from 25 to 44; 37.5% were from 45 to 64; and 17.4% were 65 years of age or older. The gender makeup of the town was 49.4% male and 50.6% female.

=== 2000 census ===
As of the census of 2000, there were 454 people, 182 households, and 133 families living in the town. The population density was 12.7 inhabitants per square mile (4.9/km^{2}). There were 207 housing units at an average density of 5.8 per square mile (2.2/km^{2}). The racial makeup of the town was 96.92% White, 1.98% Native American, 0.22% Asian, and 0.88% from two or more races. Hispanic or Latino of any race were 0.44% of the population.

There were 182 households, out of which 25.3% had children under the age of 18 living with them, 63.2% were married couples living together, 4.9% had a female householder with no husband present, and 26.4% were non-families. 18.7% of all households were made up of individuals, and 5.5% had someone living alone who was 65 years of age or older. The average household size was 2.49 and the average family size was 2.82.

In the town, the population was spread out, with 22.0% under the age of 18, 5.9% from 18 to 24, 25.8% from 25 to 44, 32.2% from 45 to 64, and 14.1% who were 65 years of age or older. The median age was 43 years. For every 100 females, there were 105.4 males. For every 100 females age 18 and over, there were 107.0 males.

The median income for a household in the town was $31,071, and the median income for a family was $35,625. Males had a median income of $30,313 versus $20,833 for females. The per capita income for the town was $14,645. About 8.1% of families and 11.8% of the population were below the poverty line, including 9.3% of those under age 18 and 21.9% of those age 65 or over.
