= Hangar =

Closed structure to hold aircraft or spacecraft in protective storage

A cutaway diagram of a hangar

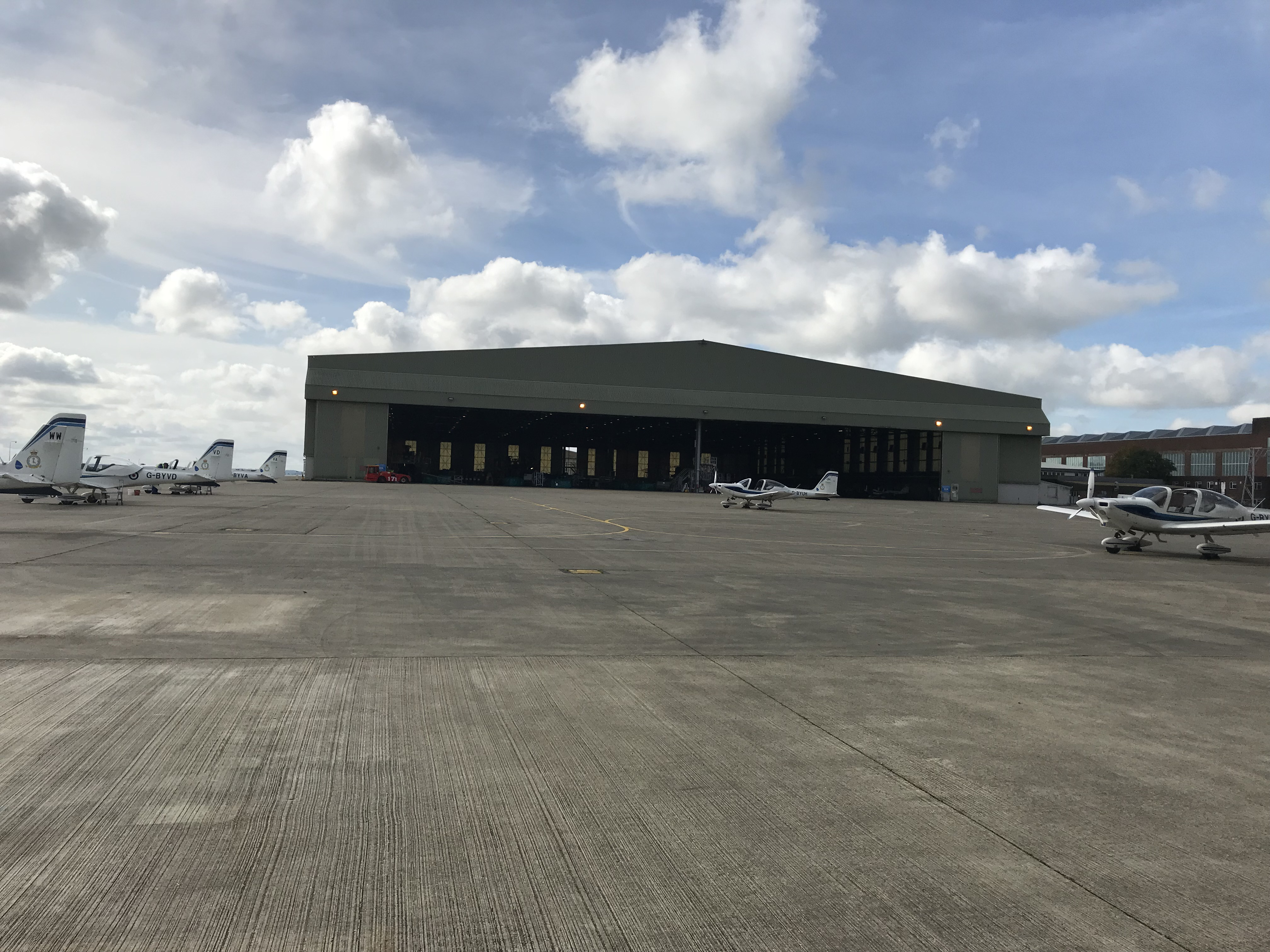
A Royal Air Force station hangar

A hangar is a building or structure designed to hold aircraft or spacecraft. Hangars are built of metal, wood, or concrete. The word hangar comes from Middle French hanghart ("enclosure near a house"), of Germanic origin, from Frankish *haimgard ("home-enclosure", "fence around a group of houses"), from *haim ("home, village, hamlet") and gard ("yard"). The term, gard, comes from the Old Norse garðr ("enclosure, garden").

Hangars are used for protection from the weather, direct sunlight and for maintenance, repair, manufacture, assembly and storage of aircraft.

== History ==
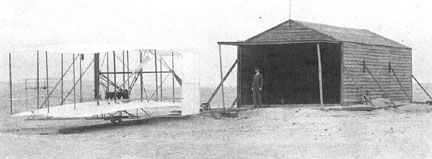
The Wright Flyer outside the aircraft's makeshift hangar

The Wright brothers stored and repaired their aircraft in a wooden hangar constructed in 1902 at Kill Devil Hills in North Carolina for their glider. After completing design and construction of the Wright Flyer in Ohio, the brothers returned to Kill Devil Hills only to find their hangar damaged. They repaired the structure and constructed a new workshop while they waited for the Flyer to be shipped.

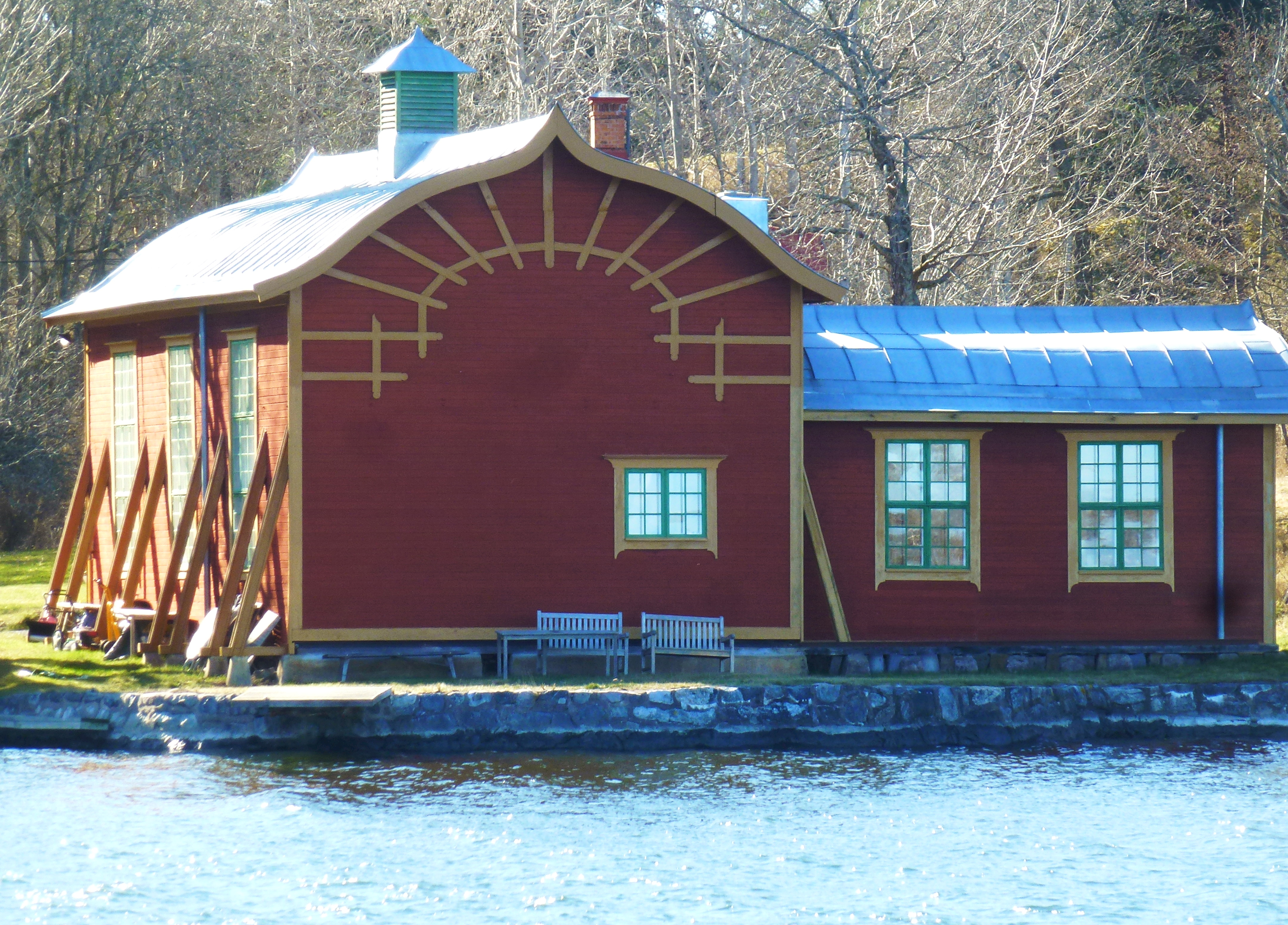
Carl Richard Nyberg's hangar for his Flugan (fly) from 1908, Täcka udden in Lidingö, Sweden

Carl Richard Nyberg used a hangar to store his 1908 Flugan (fly) in the early 20th century and in 1909, Louis Bleriot crash-landed on a northern French farm in Les Baraques (between Sangatte and Calais) and rolled his monoplane into the farmer's cattle pen. Bleriot was in a race to be the first man to cross the English Channel in a heavier-than-air aircraft, and he and set up his headquarters in the unused shed. In Britain, the earliest aircraft hangars were known as aeroplane sheds, and the oldest survivors of these are at Larkhill, Wiltshire. These were built in 1910 for the Bristol School of Flying and are now Grade II* Listed buildings. British aviation pioneer Alliott Verdon Roe built one of the first aeroplane sheds in 1907 at Brooklands, Surrey and full-size replicas of this and the 1908 Roe biplane are on display at Brooklands Museum.

As aviation became established in Britain before World War I, standard designs of hangar gradually appeared with military types too such as the Bessonneau hangar and the side-opening aeroplane shed of 1913, both of which were soon adopted by the Royal Flying Corps. Examples of the latter survive at Farnborough, Filton and Montrose airfields. During World War I, other standard designs included the RFC General Service Flight Shed and the Admiralty F-Type of 1916, the General Service Shed (featuring the characteristic Belfast-truss roof and built-in various sizes) and the Handley Page aeroplane shed (1918).

== Construction ==
=== Steel construction ===
Sheds built for rigid airships survive at Moffett Field, California; Akron, Ohio; Weeksville, North Carolina; Lakehurst, New Jersey; Santa Cruz Air Force Base in Brazil; and Cardington, Bedfordshire. Steel rigid airship hangars are some of the largest in the world.

Hangar 1, Lakehurst, is located at Naval Air Engineering Station Lakehurst (formerly Naval Air Station Lakehurst), New Jersey. The structure was completed in 1921 and is typical of airship hangar designs of World War I. The site is best known for the Hindenburg disaster, when on May 6, 1937, the German airship Hindenburg crashed and burned while landing. Hangar No.1 at Lakehurst was used to build and store the American USS Shenandoah. The hangar also provided service and storage for the airships USS Los Angeles, Akron, Macon, as well as the Graf Zeppelin and the Hindenburg.

The largest hangars ever built include the Goodyear Airdock measuring 1,175x325x211 feet and Hangar One (Mountain View, California) measuring 1,133 ft × 308 ft × 198 ft (345 m × 94 m × 60 m). The Goodyear Airdock, is in Akron, Ohio and the structure was completed on November 25, 1929. The Airdock was used for the construction of the USS Akron and her sister ship, the USS Macon.

Hangar One at Moffett Federal Field (formerly Naval Air Station Moffett Field), is located in Mountain View, California. The structure was completed in 1931. It housed the USS Macon.

=== Wood construction ===
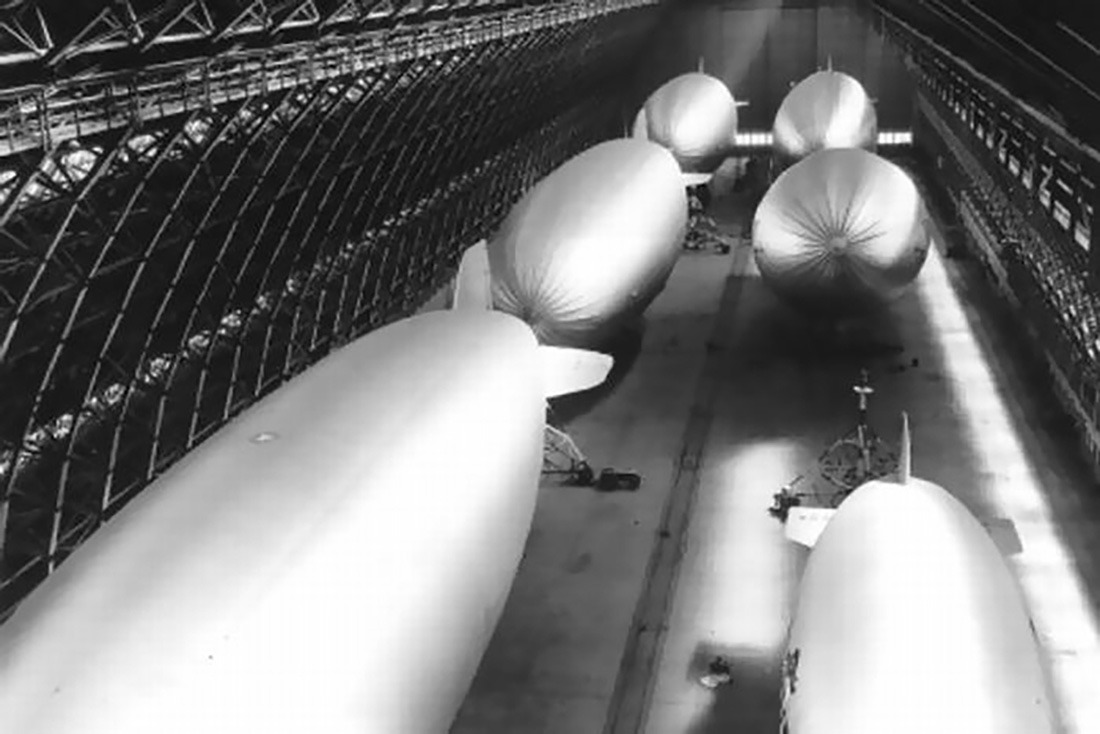
Six helium-filled blimps stored in one of the two hangars at the former US Marine Corps Air Station Tustin

The U.S. Navy established more airship operations during WWII. As part of this, ten "lighter-than-air" (LTA) bases across the United States were built as part of the coastal defence plan; a total of 17 hangars were built. Hangars at these bases are some of the world's largest freestanding timber structures. Bases with wooden hangars included: the Naval Air Stations at South Weymouth, Massachusetts (1 hangar); Lakehurst, New Jersey (2); Weeksville, North Carolina (1); Glynco, Georgia (2); Richmond, Florida (3); Houma, Louisiana (1); Hitchcock, Texas (1); Tustin (Santa Ana), California (2); Moffett Field, California (2) and Tillamook, Oregon (2). Of the seventeen, only seven remain, Moffett Federal Field, (former NAS Moffett Field), California (2); former Tustin, California (former NAS Santa Ana and MCAS Tustin), California (2); Tillamook Air Museum/Tillamook Airport (former NAS Tillamook), Oregon (1) and Joint Base McGuire-Dix-Lakehurst/Naval Support Activity Lakehurst (former NAS Lakehurst), New Jersey (2).

=== Fabric construction ===
A hangar for Cargolifter was built at Brand-Briesen Airfield 1,180 ft (360 m) long, 705 ft (215 m) wide and 348 ft (106 m) high and is a free standing steel-dome "barrel-bowl" construction large enough to fit the Eiffel Tower on its side. The company went into insolvency and in June 2003, the facilities were sold off and the airship hangar was converted to a 'tropical paradise'-themed indoor holiday resort called Tropical Islands, which opened in 2004.

An alternative to the fixed hangar is a portable shelter that can be used for aircraft storage and maintenance. Portable fabric structures can be built up to 215 ft (66 m) wide, 100 ft (30 m) high and any length. They are able to accommodate several aircraft and can be increased in size and even relocated when necessary.

== Structures and sizes ==
Hangars need special structures to be built. The width of the doors have to be large; this includes the aircraft entrance. The bigger the aircraft to be introduced, the more complex a structure is needed. According to the span of the hangar, sizes can be classified thus:

Size	Span (meters)
S	Less than 30 m
M	30–60 m
L	60–90 m
XL	90–120 m
XXL	More than 120 m

XXL hangars are built for the largest aircraft in the world like the Airbus A380, Boeing 747 and the Antonov 225, and are the most complex to erect.

== Regulation ==
Hangars are usually regulated by the building codes in the countries and jurisdictions and airports where they reside. In August 2014, the American FAA proposed legislation of how a hangar can be used on airfields that receive government funding. The definition of allowed activities included final assembly of aircraft.

== Examples ==
=== Airship hangars ===
Airship hangars or airship sheds are generally larger than conventional aircraft hangars, particularly in height. Most early airships used hydrogen gas to provide them with sufficient buoyancy for flight, so their hangars had to provide protection from stray sparks to keep the gas from exploding. Hangars that held several airships were at risk from chain-reaction explosions. For this reason, most hangars for hydrogen-based airships were built to house only one or two such craft. During the "Golden Age" of airship travel from 1900, mooring masts and sheds were constructed to build and house airships. The British government built a shed in Karachi for the R101, the Brazilian government built one in Rio de Janeiro, the Hangar do Zeppelin for the German Zeppelins, and the U.S. government constructed Moffett Field, Mountain View, California and Lakehurst Naval Air Station, Lakehurst, New Jersey.

=== Hangars aboard ships ===
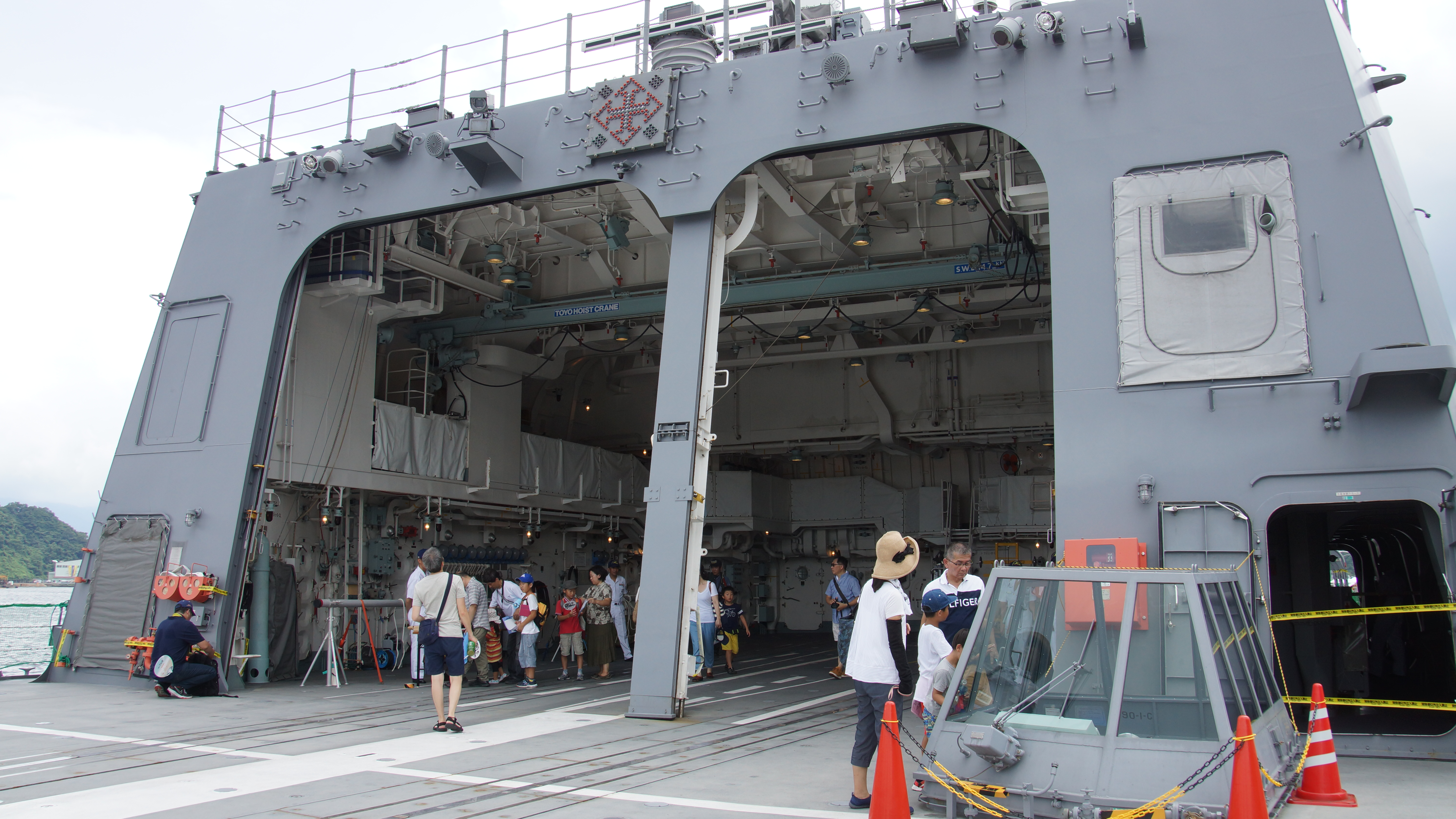
The helicopter hangar of an Akizuki-class destroyer.

Many warships carry aircraft and will often have hangars for storage and maintenance. Such hangars may be situated adjacent to the flight deck on cruisers, destroyers and frigates or underneath the flight deck with elevators to lift the aircraft on aircraft carriers and amphibious assault ships. On some vessels where space is short the hangar and flight deck share the same space, with the hangar stowing away for flight operations.

=== Hangar homes ===
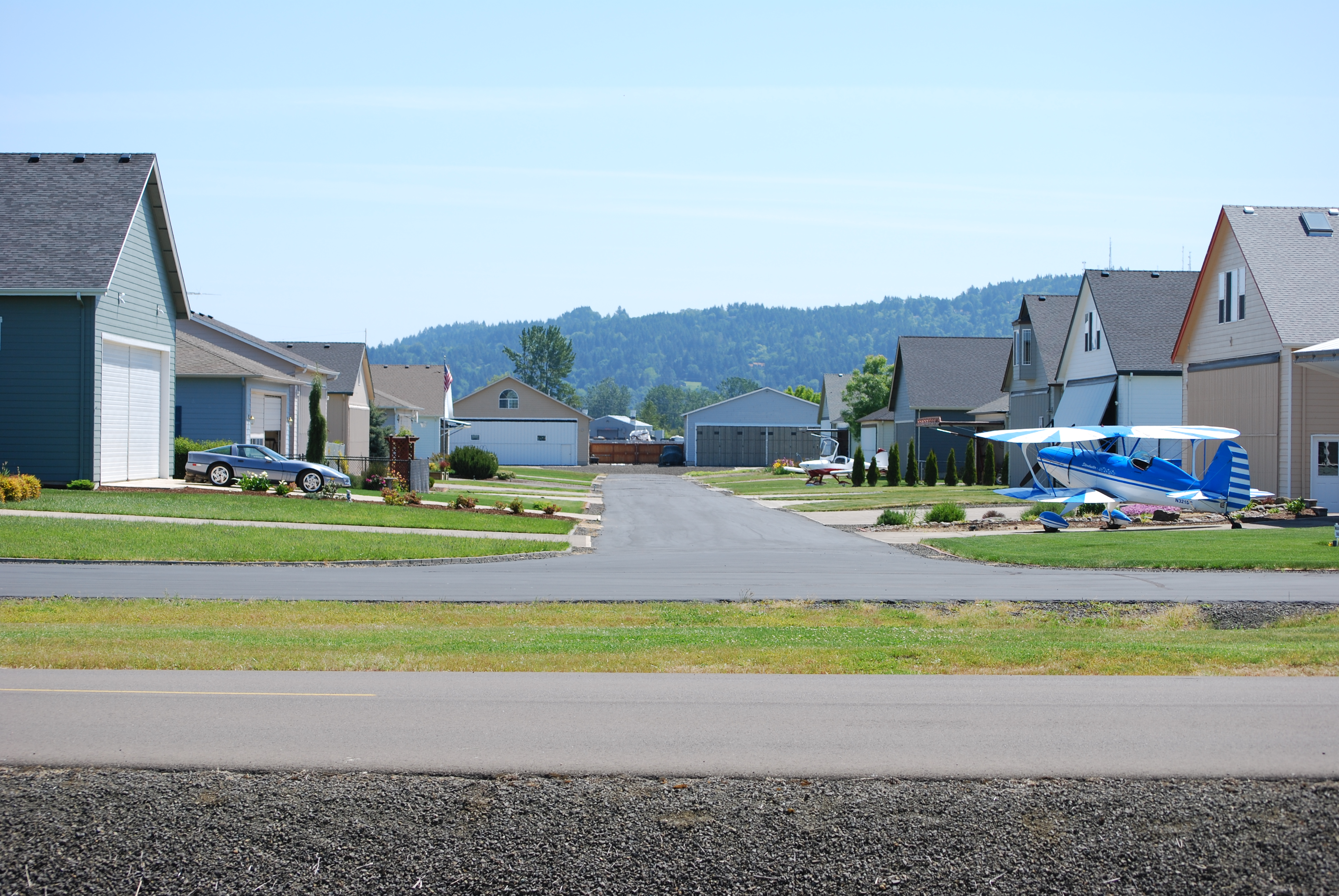
Hangar homes at Independence State Airport

A hangar home is a residence that includes a hangar attached or integrated into the house, where the owner is able to park their privately owned aircraft. Hangar Homes are usually found in residential airparks.

== Gallery ==
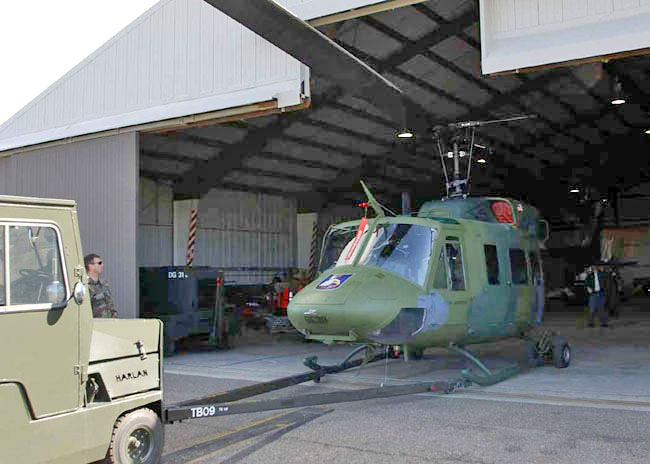
Hangars can hold fixed-wing aircraft, rotary-wing aircraft (helicopters), and lighter-than-air ships.

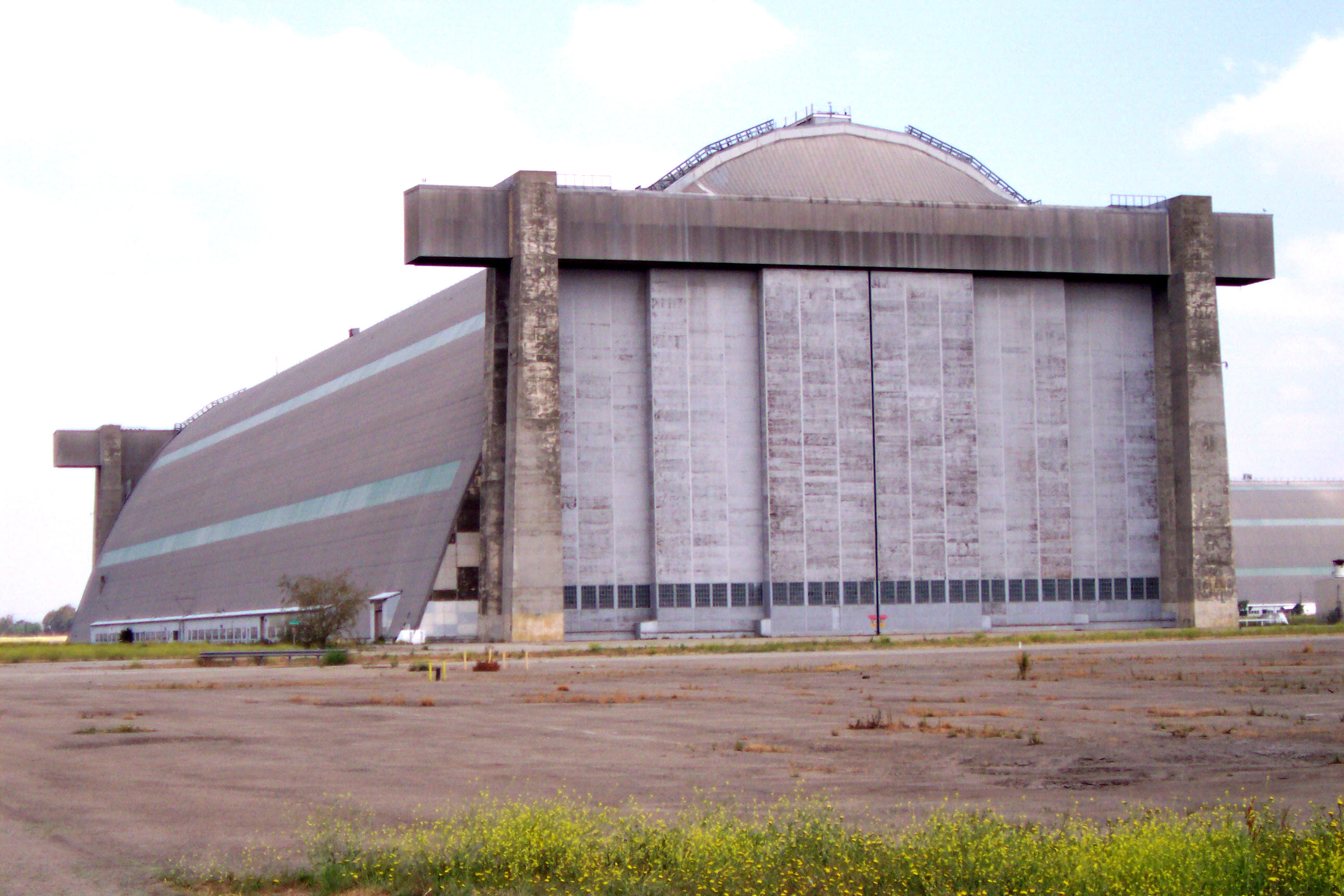
Hangar No. 2 at MCAS Tustin, designed to accommodate airships and blimps, 1,072 ft (327 m) long, 292 ft (89 m) wide and 192 ft (59 m) tall.

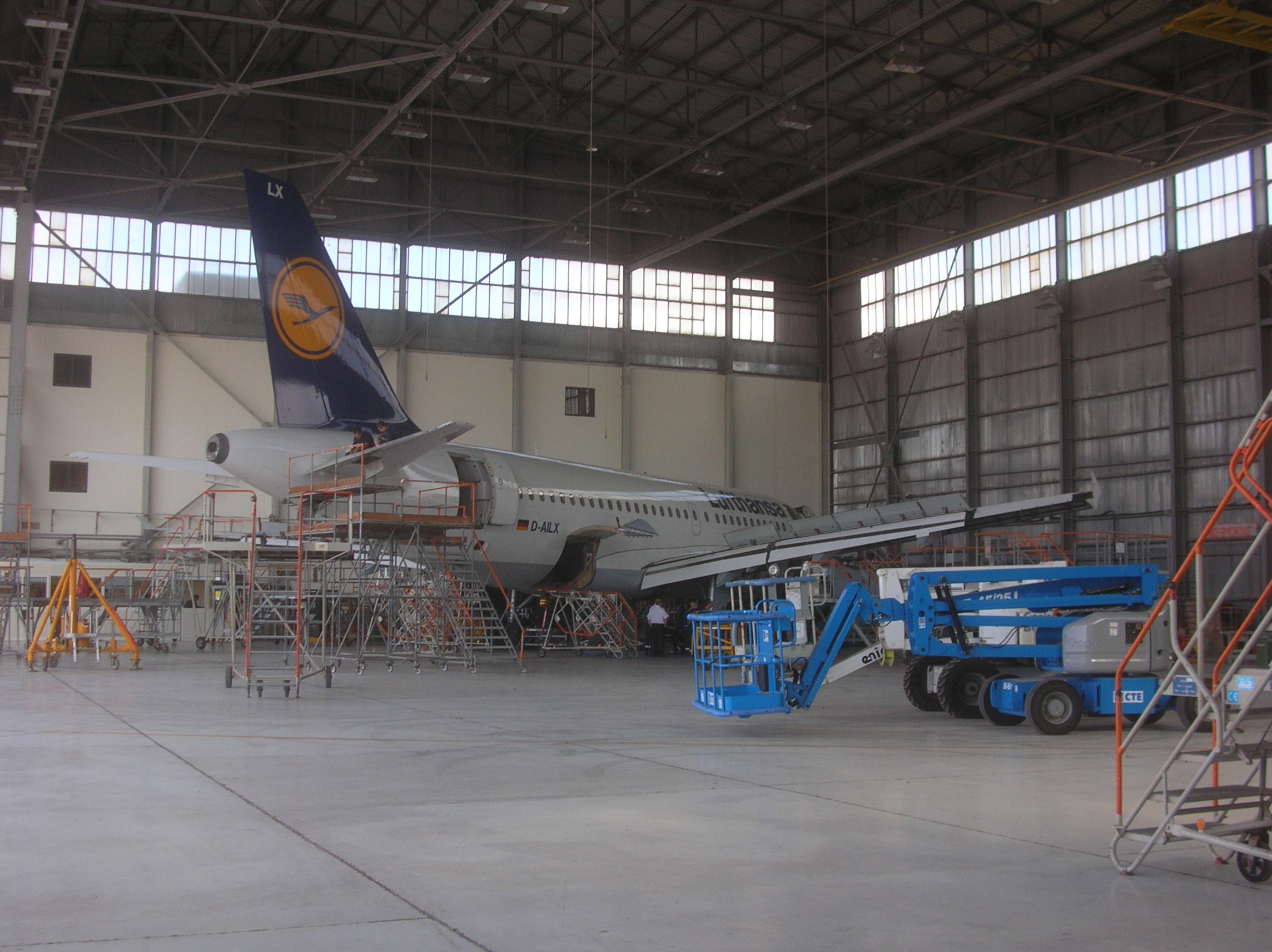
An Airbus A319 undergoing maintenance in a hangar.

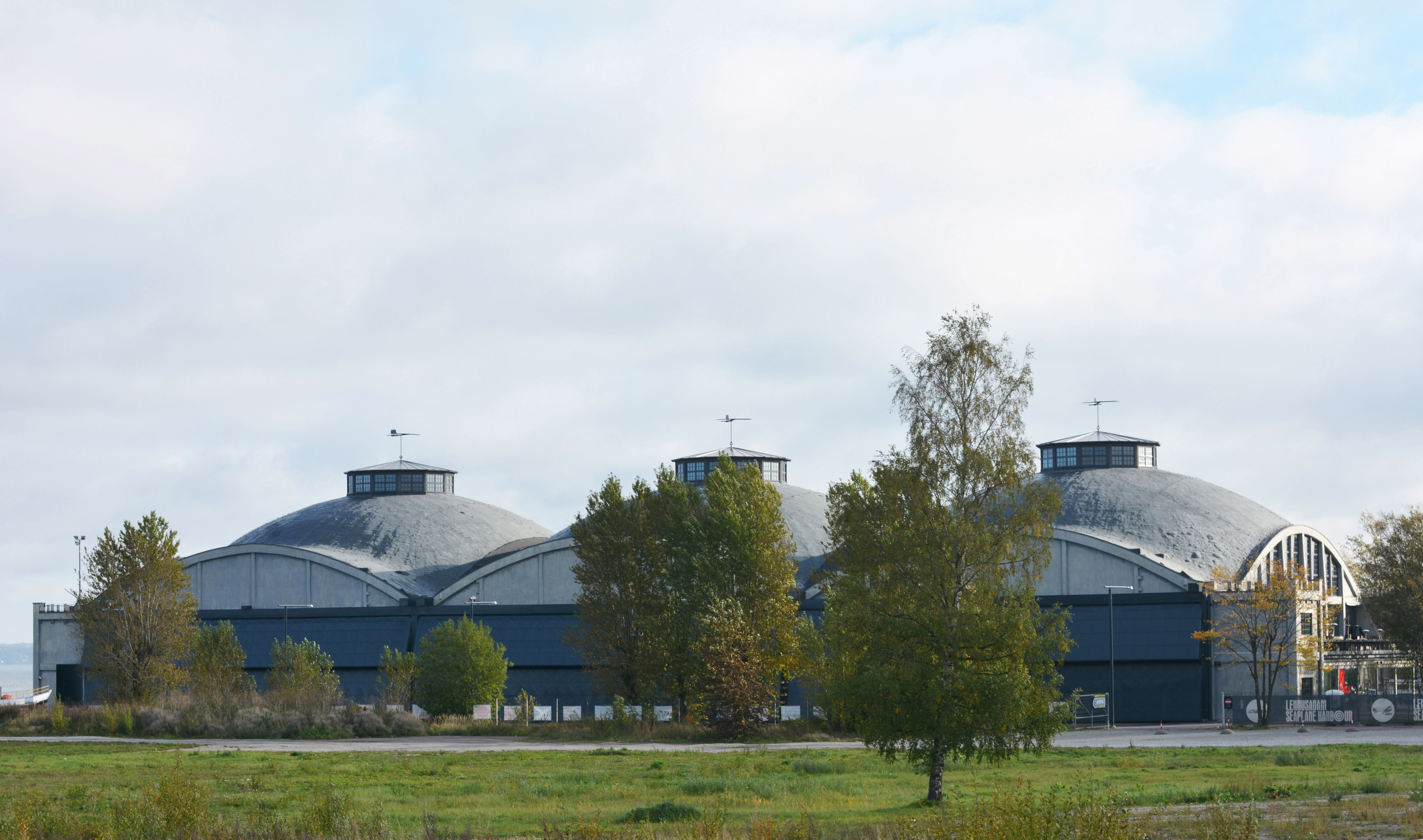
Hangars for seaplanes of the Imperial Russian Air Force in Tallinn harbor - some of the first reinforced concrete structures

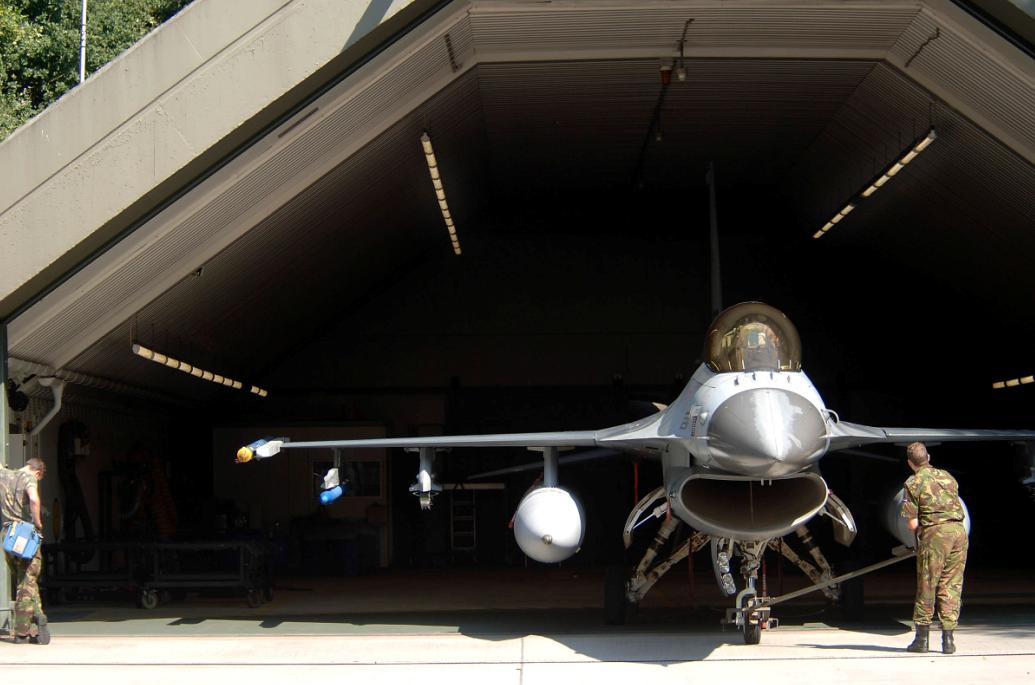
A General Dynamics F-16 Fighting Falcon in front of a Hardened Aircraft Shelter, a special type of hangar

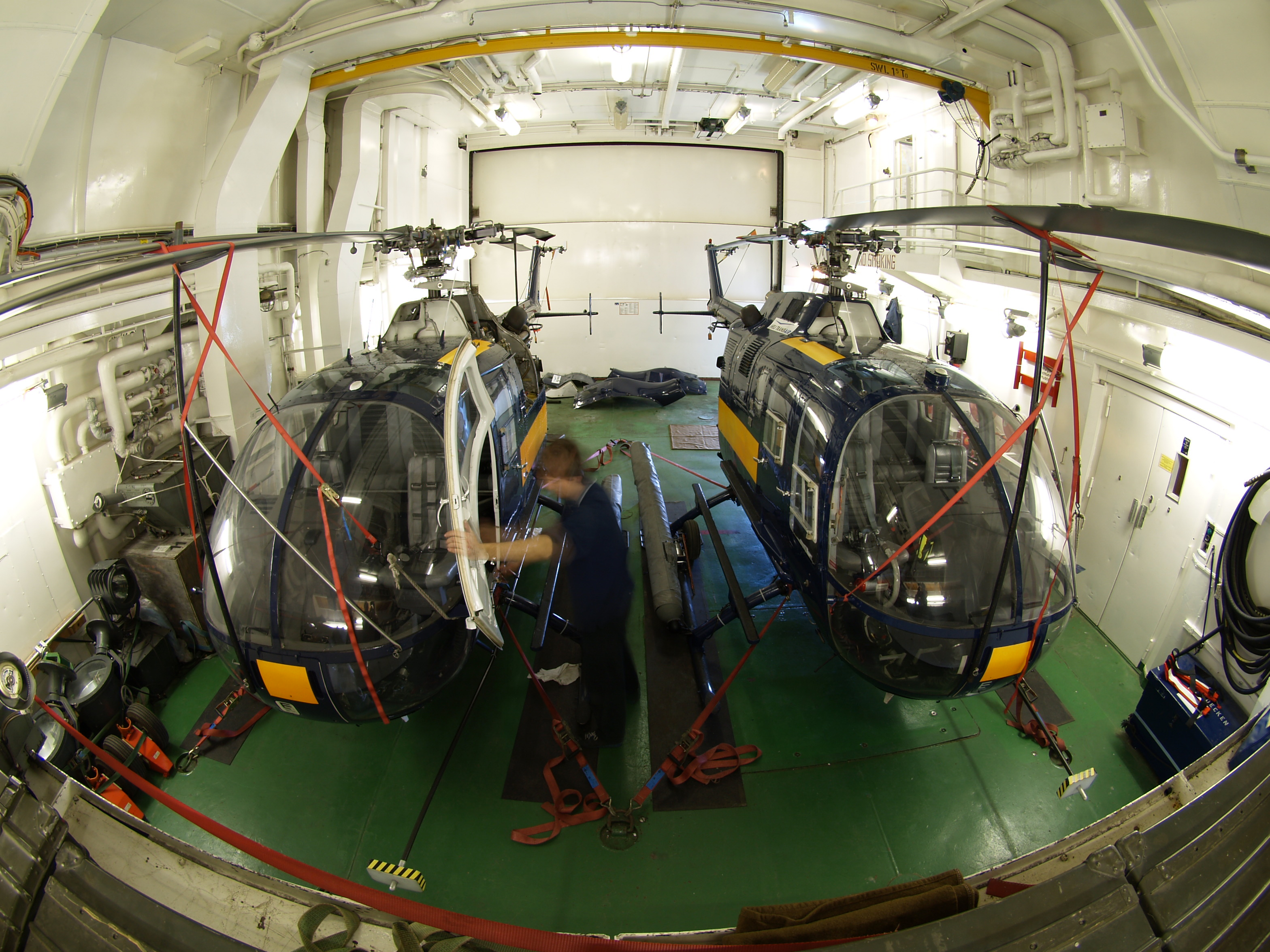
Helicopter hangar of the German research vessel Polarstern

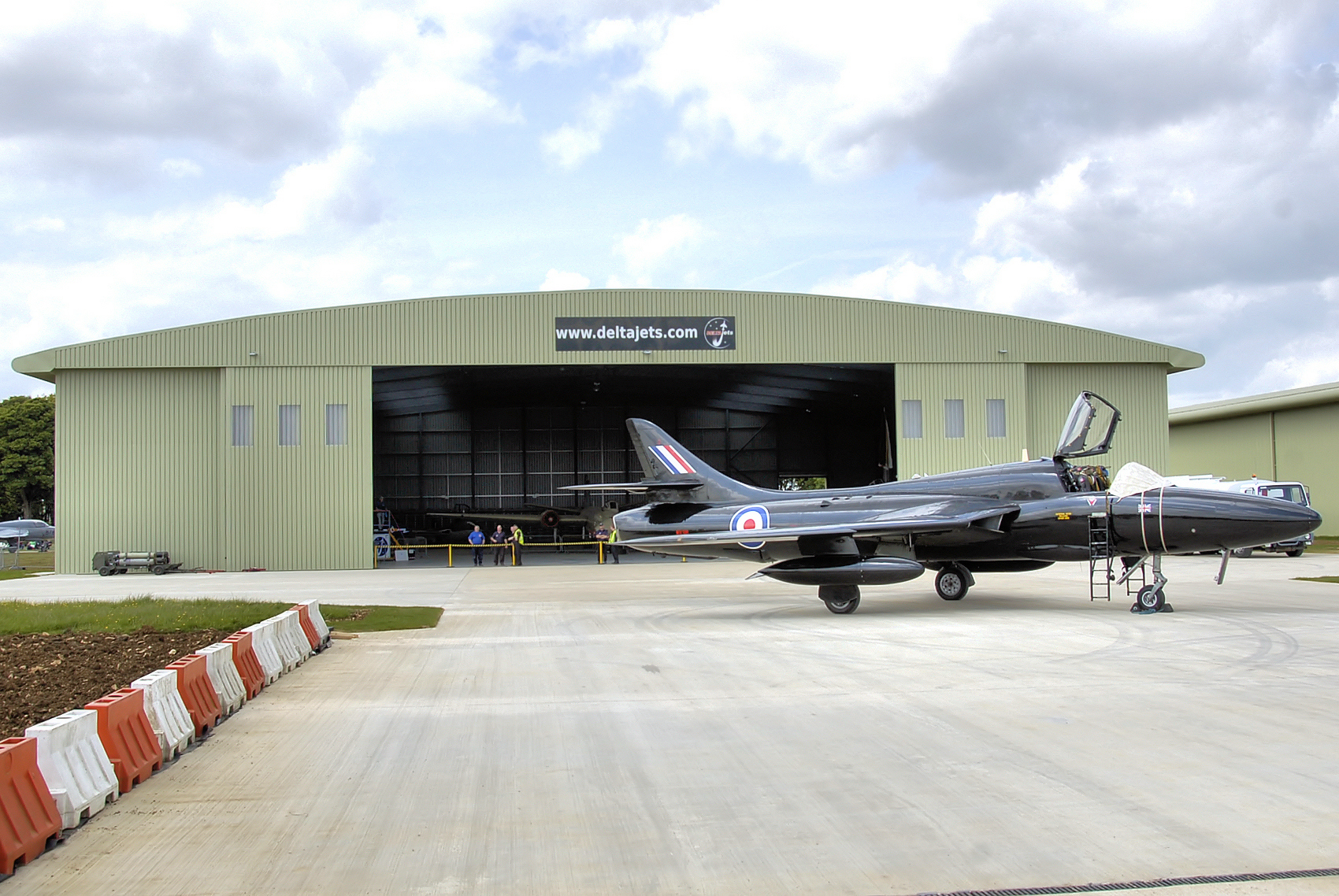
A medium-sized aircraft hangar at Kemble Airport, England

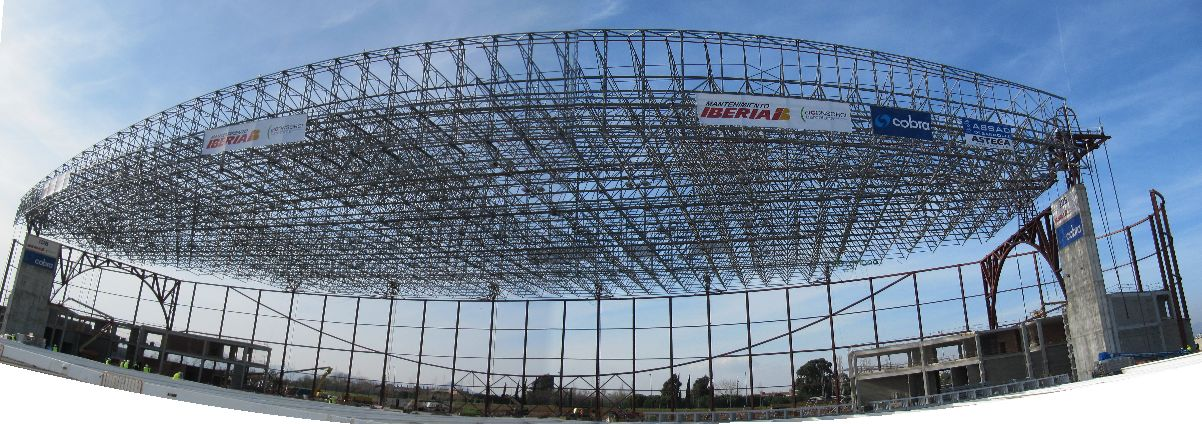
Hangar under construction for Iberia Airlines (XXL-150m span) Barcelona Airport, Spain

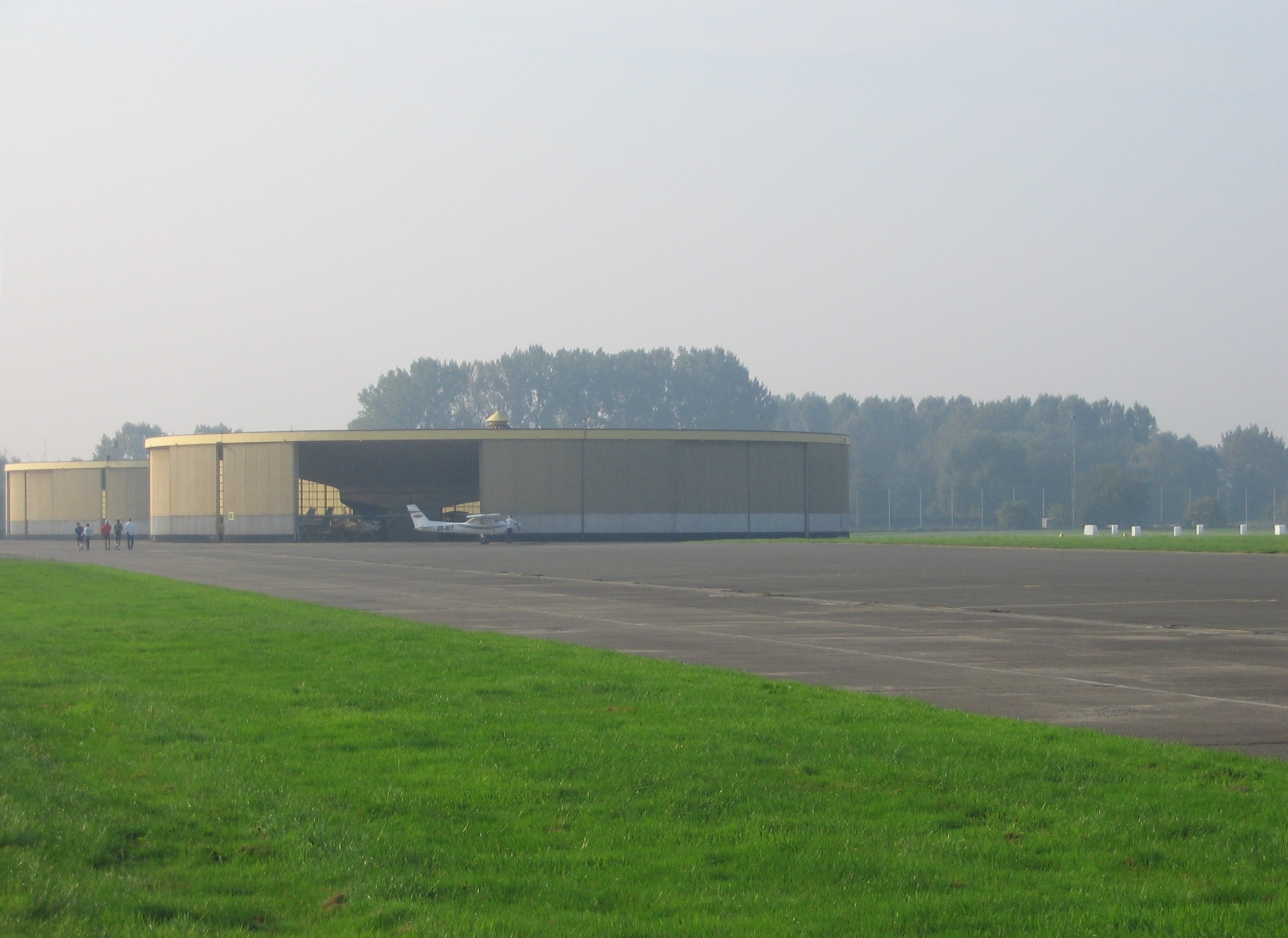
Round concrete hangars at Grimbergen Airfield, Belgium.

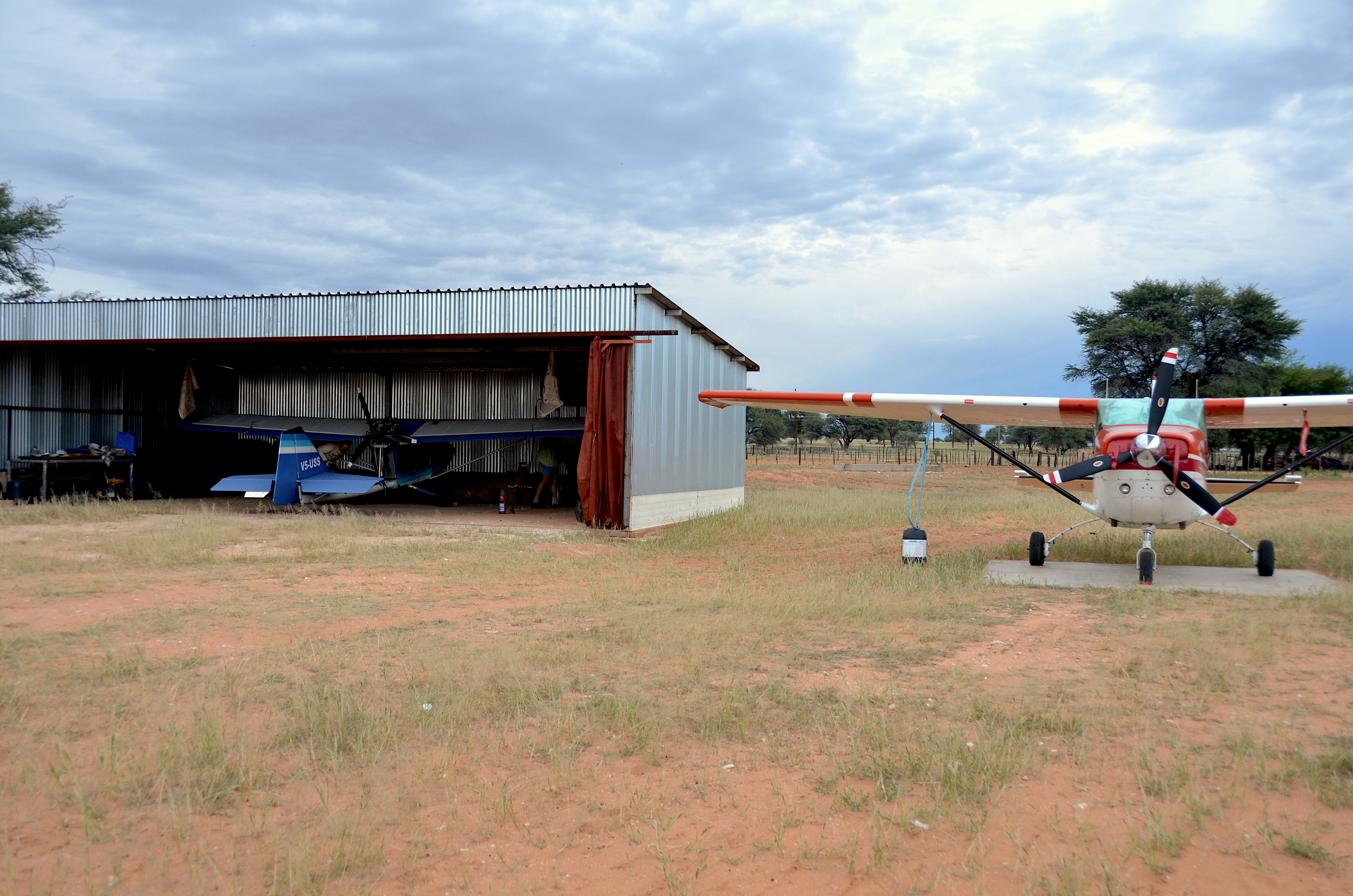
Private Hangar on a farm in Namibia (2017)

== See also ==
- Bellman hangar (temporary hangar designed in the United Kingdom in 1936)
- Bessonneau hangar (portable timber and canvas hangar used during World War I)
- Blister hangar (arched portable hangar patented in 1939)
- Archerfield Second World War Igloos Hangar Complex (from February 1943 by the Allied Works Council)
- Double cantilever hangar
- Hangar 18
- Hangar-7
- Langley Aerodrome
- Loring Air Force Base Arch Hangar, a large hangar constructed for multiple B-36 Peacemaker aircraft
- Military building
- Tee hangar (primarily used for private aircraft at general aviation airports)
- Type-C hangar, built by the Royal Air Force during its Expansion Period (1934 to 1939)
- Underground hangar
- Eagle 44
- Vehicle Assembly Building, the largest spacecraft hangar ever to exist
