= Flugan =

Failed experimental aircraft

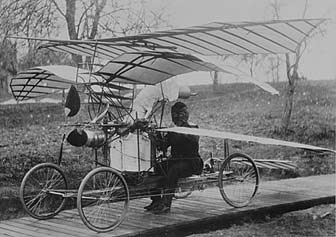
"The Fly" with Carl Richard Nyberg as the pilot on a circular wood test track. Photo from around 1904–1906.

Flugan (The Fly) was an early aeroplane designed and built by Carl Richard Nyberg outside his home in Lidingö, Sweden. Construction started in 1897 and he kept working on it until 1922. The craft only managed a few short jumps and Nyberg was often ridiculed, however several of his innovations are still in use. He was the first to test his design in a wind tunnel and the first to build a hangar. The reasons for failure include poor wing and propeller design and, allegedly, Nyberg's fear of heights.

The Flugan had a wingspan of 5 meters, and the surface area of the wings was 13 m^{2}. It was powered by a steam engine heated by four blowtorches (UK: blowlamps) and it produced 10 hp (7 kW) at 2000 rpm. The power-to-weight ratio was actually better than the Wright engine. The total weight of the plane was 80 kg. The weight of the engine was 18 kg.
