= Loring Air Force Base Double Cantilever Hangar =

Coordinates: 46°56′6.94″N 67°53′21.65″W

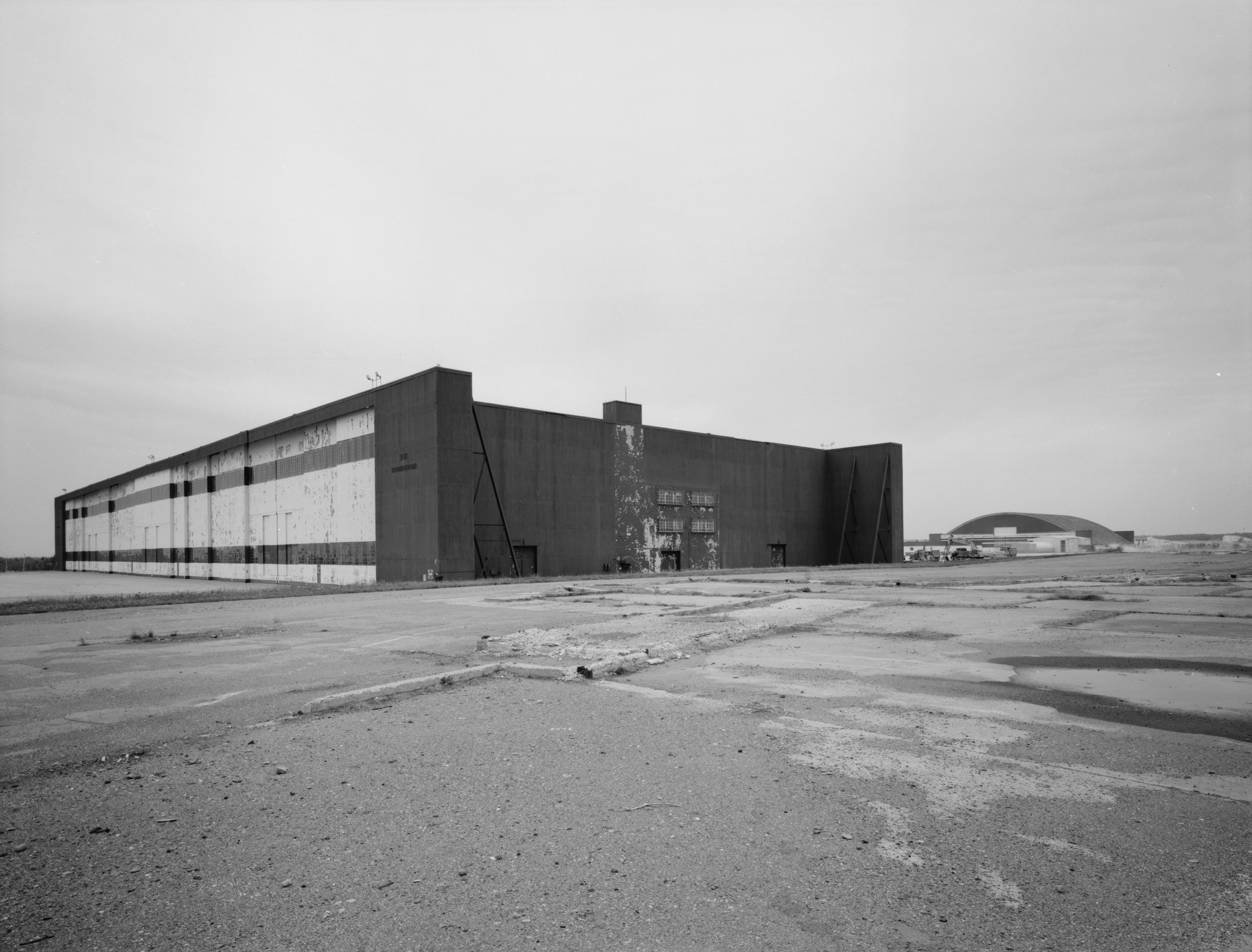
A view of the hangar, looking towards the southeast

The Loring Air Force Base Double Cantilever hangar (officially known as Building 8280) is the largest structure at the former Loring Air Force Base, now the Loring Commerce Centre. The hangar measures approximately 250 feet (76 m) by 600 feet (180 m) and appurtenances cover 3.925 acres (1.588 ha). It was built with the capability of holding five B-36 Peacemaker, or six B-52 Stratofortress aircraft. The main hangar building was built in 1954 at a cost of $4.6 million ($53 million in 2023).

== Description ==
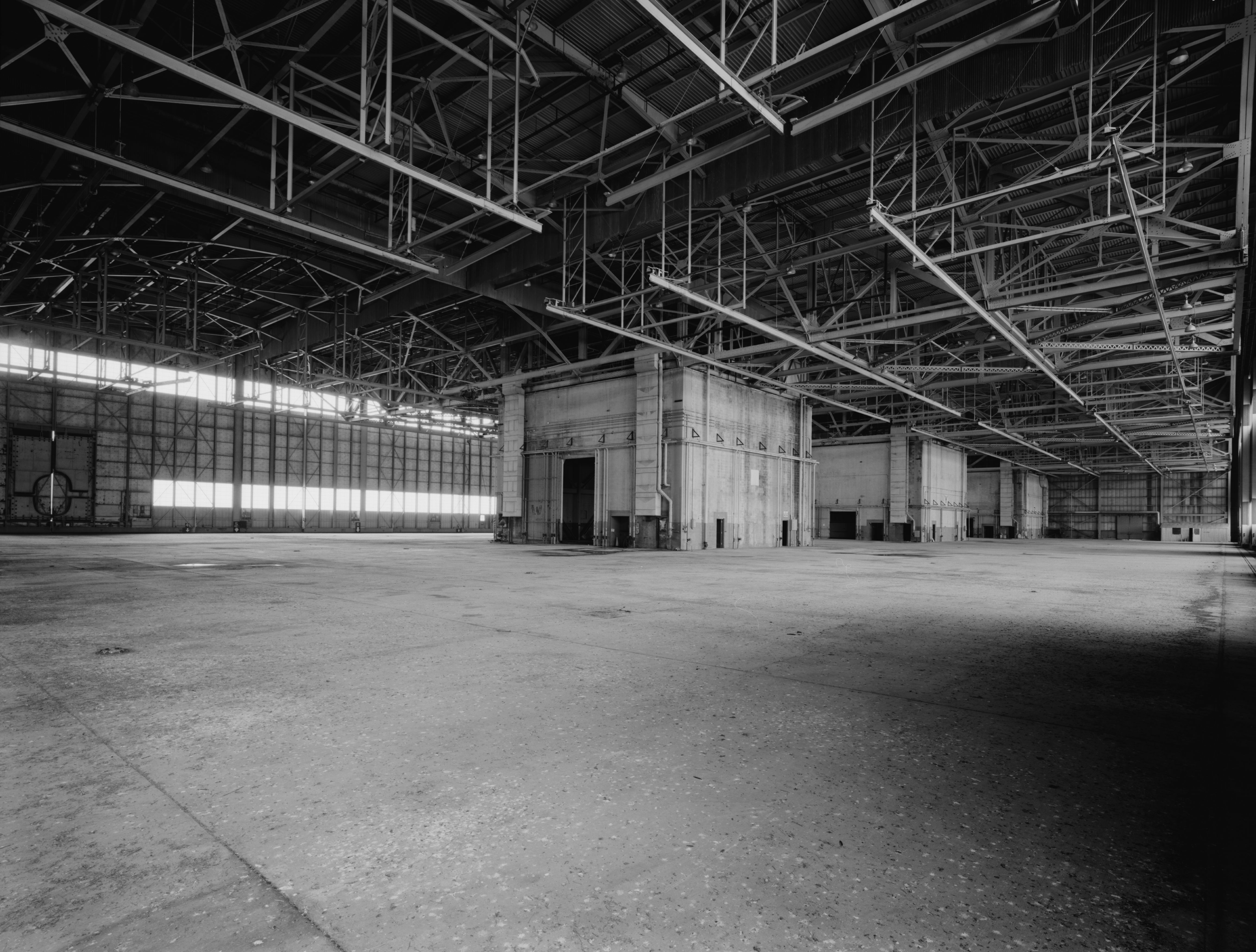
The interior of the hangar

The hangar was constructed as one of the first hangars at the base, which opened two years prior. The building was constructed with the goal of giving the Strategic Air Command crews a place to sustain an aircraft's condition should behavior by the Soviet Union warrant an attack. It also had the added benefit of protecting the crews from the harsh Maine weather. Having the capability to house five B-36 Peacemaker aircraft was critical, as the base was originally designated to host over one hundred of these aircraft. It was also one of the first double-cantilever hangars built for the Strategic Air Command, due to a new demand for a larger and more efficient space, in contrast to the World War II-era buildings inherited on many other bases. The building has an ejected caisson foundation designed to ensure stability in the harsh conditions of northern Maine. The foundation consists of 260 24-inch (610 mm) diameter concrete caissons that extend down to limestone bedrock at a depth of 25 feet (7.6 m). Longitudinal arched steel trusses that are cantilevered 95 feet (29 m) at both ends from the shop supports in the center allow maximum vertical clearance. The north and south walls of the hangar each have a set of six doors that, when fully open, form a 300-foot (91 m) wide opening that accommodates the full wingspan of a B-36.

== Post-closure usage ==
After the 1994 closure of Loring Air Force Base, many of the buildings were evaluated for historical significance in the Loring AFB Historic Building Inventory and Evaluation. The hangar was one of a handful of structures on the base that were listed for possible future inclusion on the National Register of Historic Places, due to its historic nature. This view was concurred by the Maine State Historic Preservation Officer and the Air Force's recommendation of the Historic American Buildings Survey. The hangar is one of several Loring AFB buildings that have new uses as components of the Loring Commerce Centre.

== Current use ==
The hanger is now used by Aerointelligence as their primary aircraft maintenance facility.
