= Propane torch =

Tool for generating heat and flame by burning propane

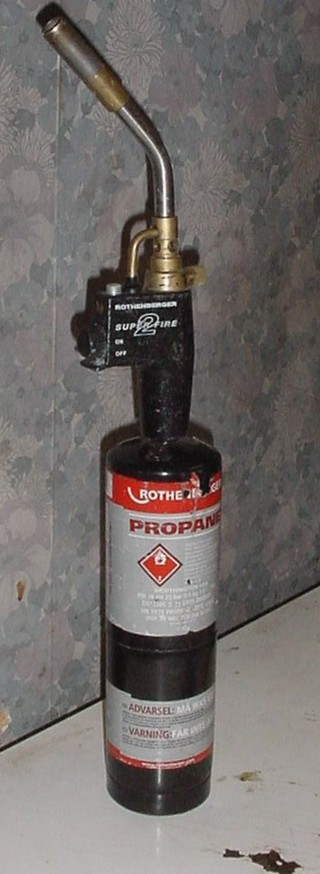
Handheld propane blowlamp (UK)/blowtorch (US)

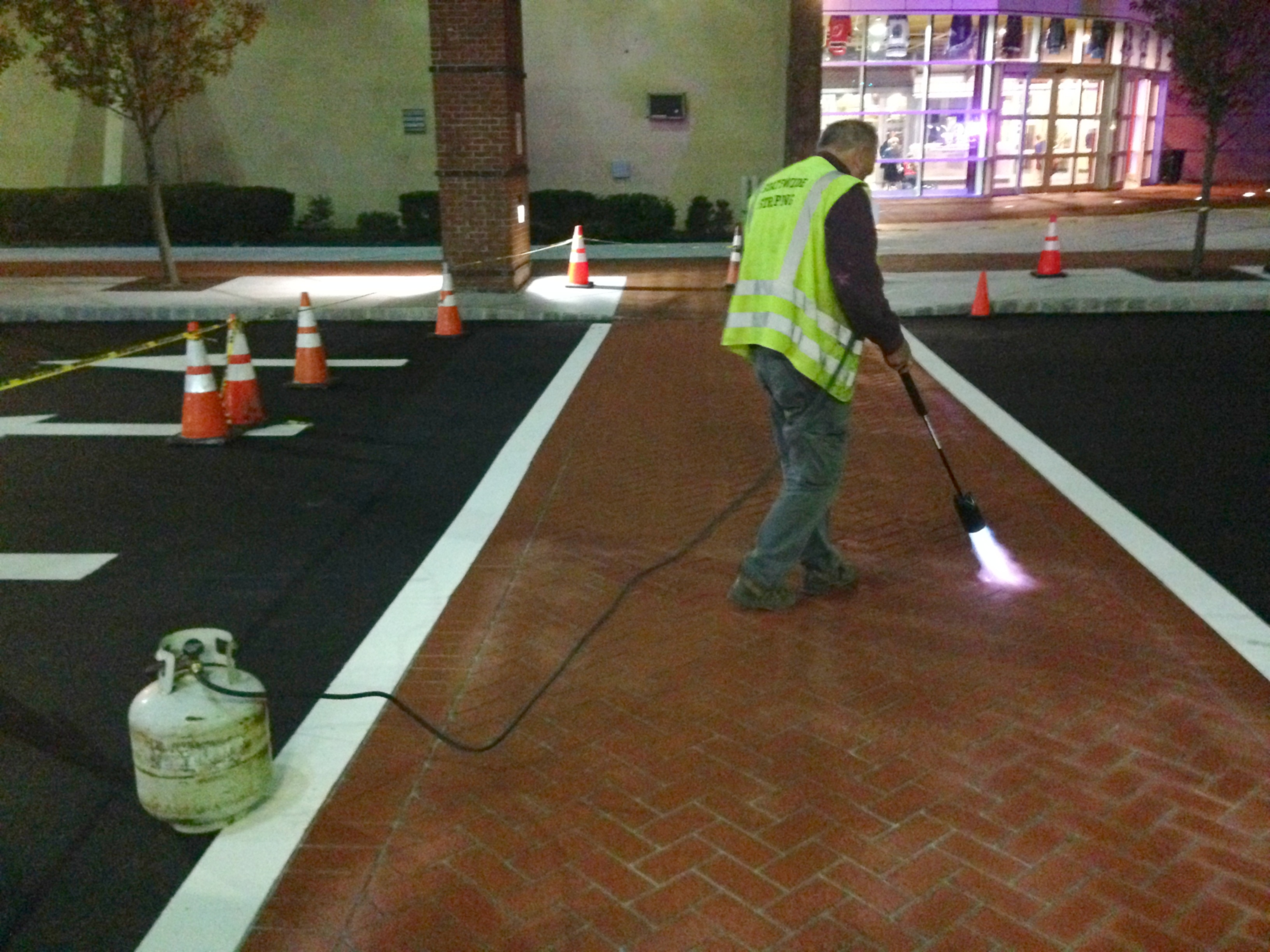
Large propane torch used for construction

A propane torch is a tool normally used for the application of flame or heat which uses propane, a hydrocarbon gas, for its fuel and ambient air as its combustion medium. Propane is one of a group of by-products of the natural gas and petroleum industries known as liquefied petroleum gas (LPG). Propane and other fuel torches are most commonly used in the manufacturing, construction and metal-working industries.

== Fuels ==
Propane is often the fuel of choice because of its low price, ease of storage and availability, hence the name "propane torch". The gasses MAPP gas and Map-pro are similar to propane, but burn hotter. They are usually found in a yellow canister, as opposed to propane's blue, black, or green. Alternative fuel gases can be harder to store and more dangerous for the user. For example, acetylene needs a porous material mixed with acetone in the tank for safety reasons and cannot be used above a certain pressure and withdrawal rate. Natural gas is a common fuel for household cooking and heating but cannot be stored in liquid form without cryogenic refrigeration.

== Mechanism ==
Small air-only torches normally use the Venturi effect to create a pressure differential which causes air to enter the gas stream through precisely sized inlet holes or intakes, similar to how a car's carburetor works. The fuel and air mix sufficiently, but imperfectly, in the burner's tube before the flame front is reached. The flame also receives some further oxygen from the air surrounding it. Oxygen-fed torches use the high pressure of the stored oxygen to push the oxygen into a common tube with the fuel.

== Uses ==
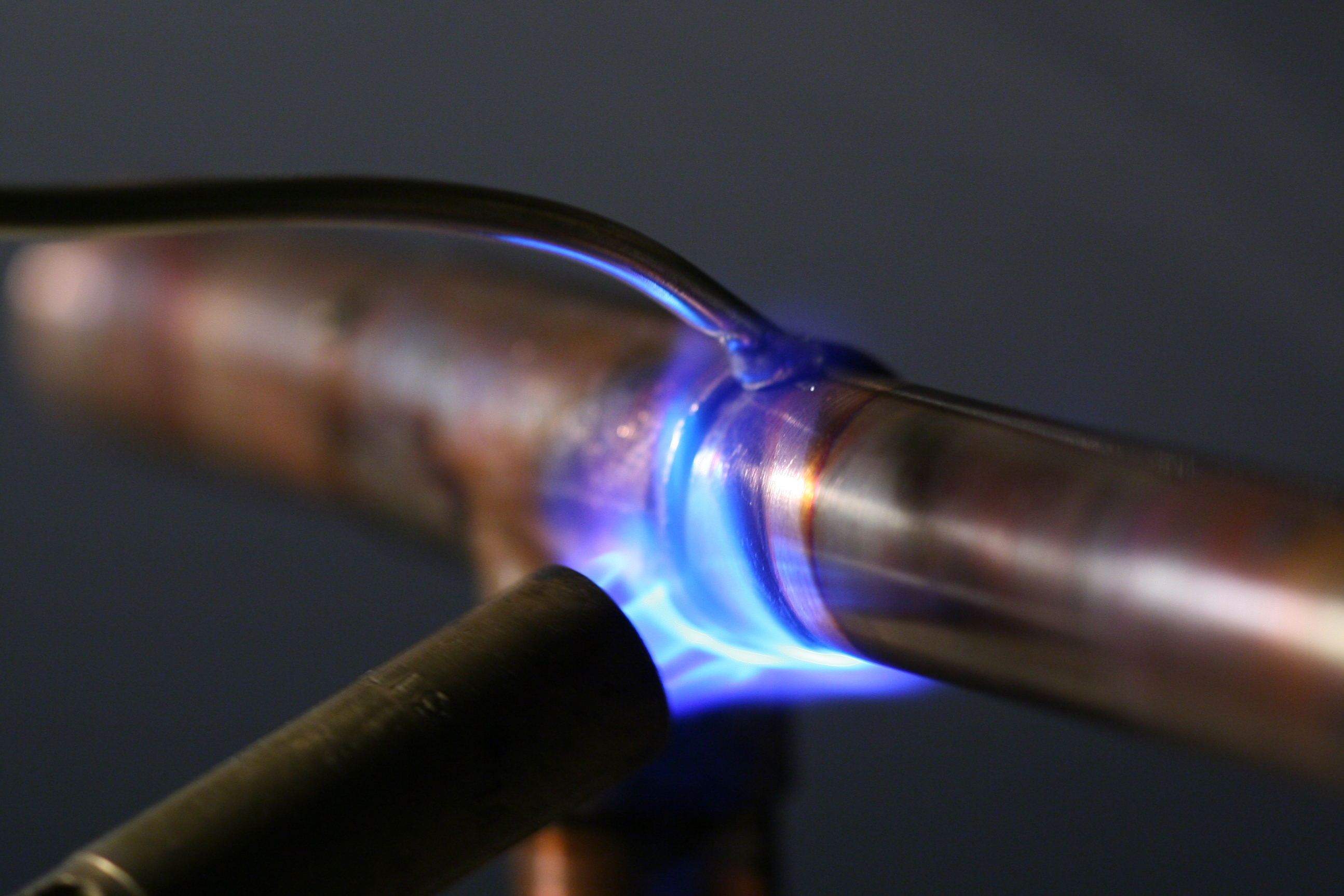
Handheld propane torch being used to solder copper pipes for residential water mains

Propane torches are frequently employed to solder copper water pipes. They can also be used for some low temperature welding applications, as well as for brazing dissimilar metals together. They can also be used for annealing, for heating metals up in order to bend them more easily, bending glass, and for doing flame tests.

== Complete and incomplete combustion ==
With oxygen/propane torches, the air/fuel ratio can be much lower. The stoichiometric equation for complete combustion of propane with 100% oxygen is:

C_{3}H_{8} + 5 (O_{2}) → 4 (H_{2}O) + 3 (CO_{2})

In this case, the only products are CO_{2} and water. The balanced equation shows to use 1 mole of propane for every 5 moles of oxygen.

With air/fuel torches, since air contains about 21% oxygen, a very large ratio of air to fuel must be used to obtain the maximum flame temperature with air. If the propane does not receive enough oxygen, some of the carbon from the propane is left unburned. An example of incomplete combustion that uses 1 mole of propane for every 4 moles of oxygen:

C_{3}H_{8} + 4 (O_{2}) → 4 (H_{2}O) + 2 (CO_{2}) + 1 C

The extra carbon product will cause soot to form, and the less oxygen used, the more soot will form. There are other unbalanced ratios where incomplete combustion products such as carbon monoxide (CO) are formed, such as:

6 (C_{3}H_{8}) + 29 (O_{2}) → 24 (H_{2}O) + 16 (CO_{2}) + 2 CO

=== Flame temperature ===
An air-fed torch's maximum adiabatic flame temperature is assumed to be around 2,000 °C (3,600 °F). However, a typical primary flame will only achieve 1,100 °C (2,000 °F) to 1,250 °C (2,250 °F). Oxygen-fed torches can be much hotter at up to 2,550 °C (4,600 °F).

== See also ==
- Butane torch
- Blowtorch
- Thermal lance

== Bibliography ==
- Trellis Craft: How to Make Your Own Copper Pipe Garden Ornaments. Castcraft. 2003. pp. 11–. ISBN 978-0-9727691-0-5.
- Editors of Creative Publishing (1 July 2008). Black & Decker The Complete Guide to Plumbing: Expanded 4th Edition - Modern Materials and Current Codes - All New Guide to Working with Gas Pipe. Creative Publishing international. pp. 276–. ISBN 978-1-61673-362-9.
