= Butane torch =

Tool for generating heat and flame

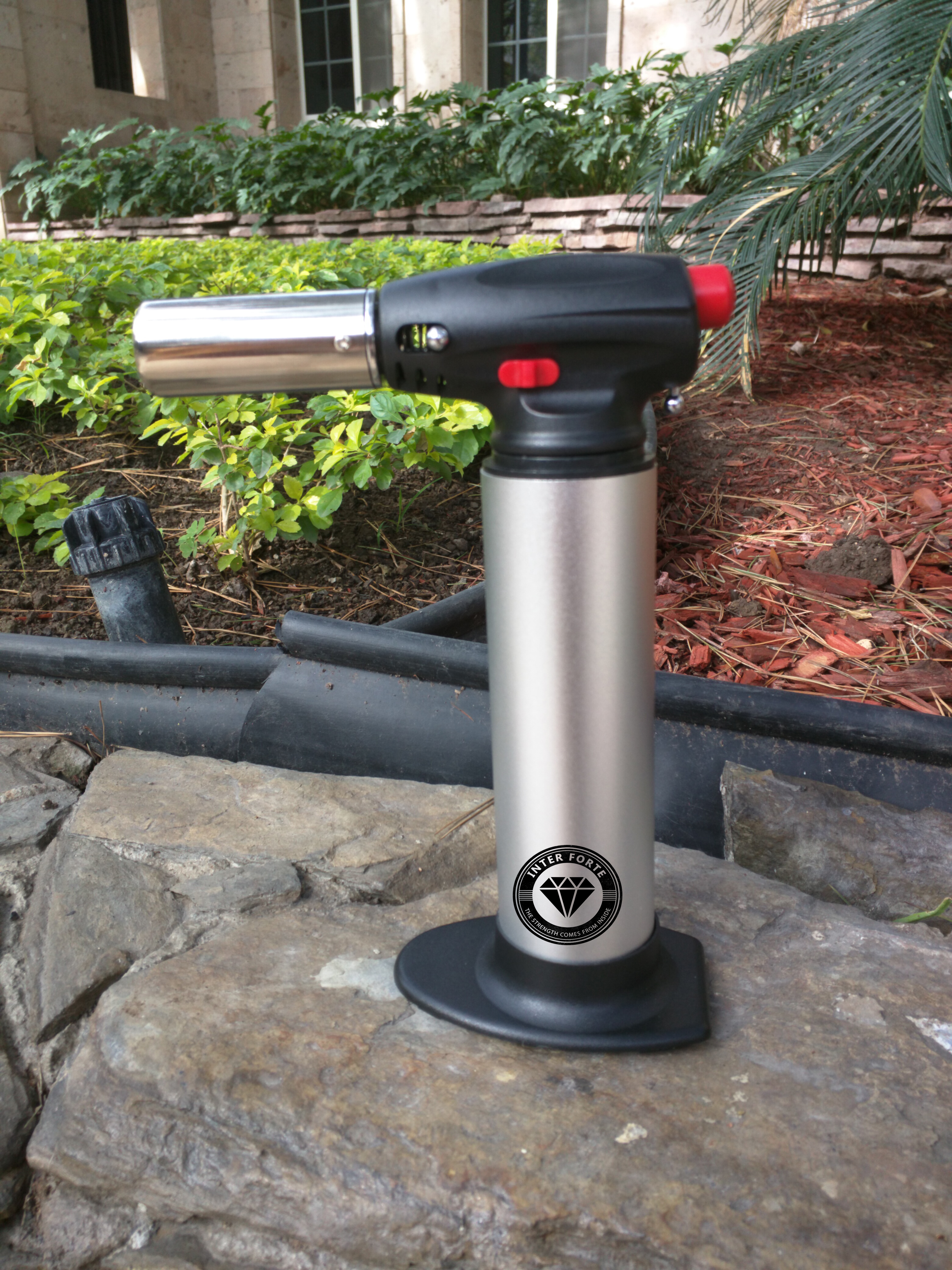
Torch for soldering, plumbing, jewelry and brazing

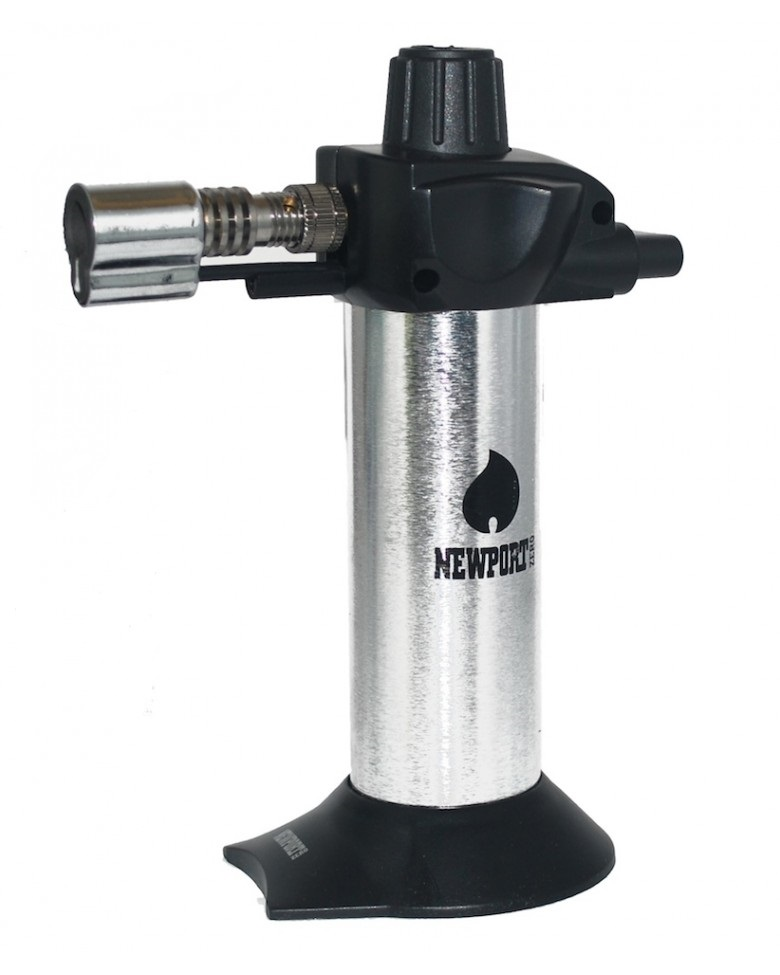
A small butane torch made for kitchen use

A butane torch is a tool which creates an intensely hot flame using a fuel mixture of liquefied petroleum gases (LPG) typically including some percentage of butane, a flammable gas.

Consumer air butane torches are often claimed to develop flame temperatures up to approximately 1,430 °C (2,610 °F). This temperature is high enough to melt many common metals, such as aluminum and copper, and hot enough to vaporize many organic compounds as well.

== Applications ==
=== Brazing, soldering, plumbing ===
Often used as daily task tools, butane torches work very well for home improvement and work to solve problems with plumbing, soldering, and brazing. Most of the time copper, silver, and other metals are used for home repairs of tubes and other house things.

=== Culinary ===
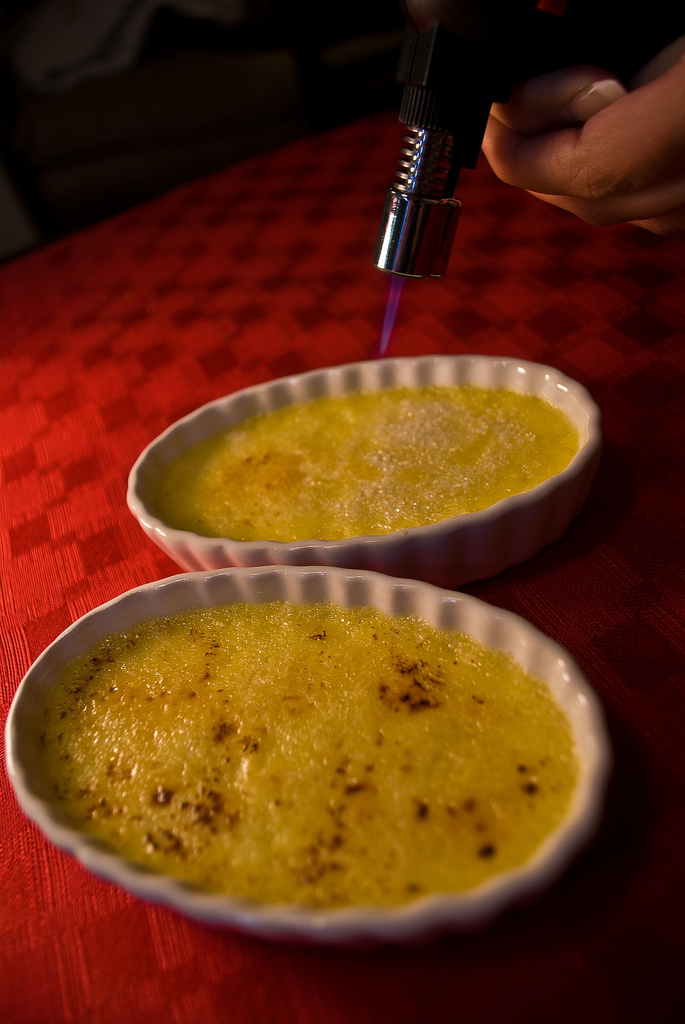
Using a torch to caramelize a crème brûlée

Butane torches are frequently employed as kitchen gadgets to caramelize sugar in cooking, such as when making crème brûlée. They may be marketed as kitchen torches, cooking torches, or culinary torches. Use of the butane torch in the kitchen is not limited to caramelizing sugar; it can be used to melt or brown toppings on casseroles or soups, to melt cheese, to sear meats, and to roast or char vegetables such as peppers.

=== Cigars ===
Pocket butane torches are commonly used as lighters for cigars, capitalizing on the intensity of the flame to light quickly and evenly the large, relatively damp, burning surface of a cigar.

=== Bartender ===
Many bartenders and mixologists use butane torches in their recipes.

=== Drug use ===
Butane torches are sometimes used in vaporizing cocaine free base (crack), black tar heroin, methamphetamine or hash oil for inhalation.

== See also ==
- Propane torch
- Lighter
- Blowtorch
- List of cooking appliances
- Oxy-fuel welding and cutting
