= Double cantilever hangar =

A double cantilever hangar is a type of hangar that was constructed by the United States Air Force during the Cold War. Large hangars were constructed at Castle Air Force Base, Carswell Air Force Base, Loring Air Force Base and McGuire Air Force Base, while smaller hangars were constructed at Edwards Air Force Base, Hanscom Air Force Base, Homestead Air Force Base, March Air Force Base, and Travis Air Force Base. Pease Air Force Base is reported to have one as well.

== See also ==
- Loring Air Force Base Double Cantilever Hangar
