= Carl Richard Nyberg =

Swedish inventor and industrialist

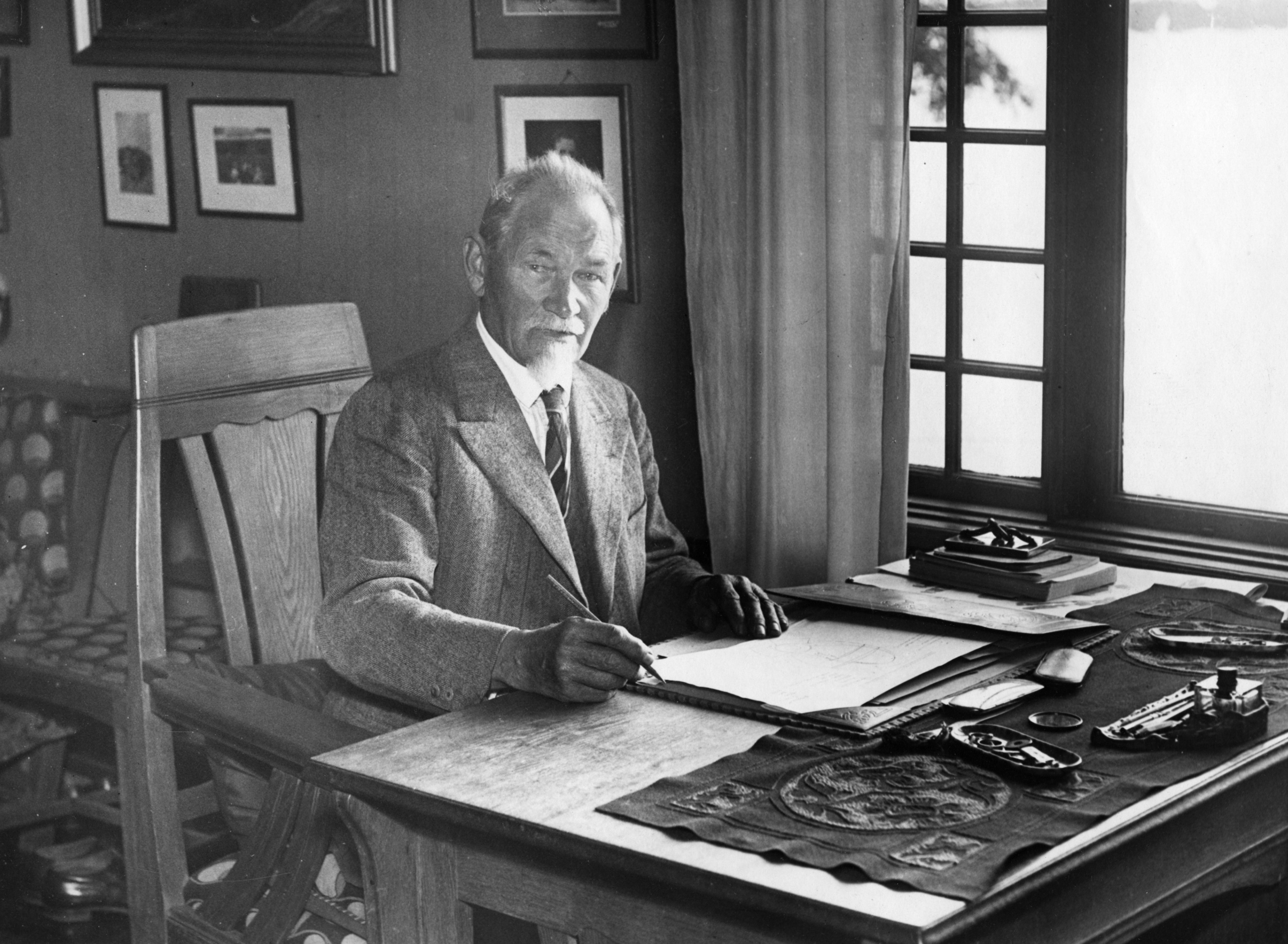
- Born: 28 May 1858; Arboga, Sweden
- Died: 25 March 1939 (aged 80); Stockholm, Sweden
- Education: Metal worker
- Occupations: Inventor; industrialist
- Known for: Blowtorch, aeroplanes
- Title: Engineer

Carl Richard Nyberg (28 May 1858 – 25 March 1939) was a Swedish inventor and industrialist. Nyberg was a pioneer in mechanical engineering. He received a patent for a blow lamp and was an aviation pioneer.

== Biography ==
Nyberg was born at Arboga in Västmanland, Sweden. After school he started working for a jeweller and later he moved to Stockholm and worked with various metalworks. He later worked for Johan Erik Erikson (1838-1883) at J. E. Eriksons mekaniska verkstad.

While working there he had the idea of the blowtorch. He later worked on the idea and created a blowtorch with strong, directed heat and with several safety measures. In 1882 he set up a workshop at Luntmakargatan in Stockholm making blowtorches. However the business didn't work well because it took too long to both manufacture and sell.

In 1884 he moved his workshop to Sundbyberg. In 1886, he met Max Sievert (1849–1913) who had founded AB Sieverts Kabelverk in Sundbyberg. Sievert became interested in Nyberg's blowtorch and started selling it. Nyberg started AB Alpha and after encouragement from Lars Magnus Ericsson (1846–1926), founder of telephone equipment manufacturer Ericsson, he started producing wire.

After Primus started producing blowtorches he also decided to make paraffin oil/kerosene cookers. The first model, called Viktoria, wasn't very successful, but the later Svea did better. He delivered many to Russia and soon he produced 3000 per week. In 1906 the company was changed into a stock company. He was generous to his workers and often gave them stock in the company.

Nyberg worked on many other inventions including steam engines, aeroplanes and boat propellers. He was most known as an aviation pioneer. From 1897 and onward until around 1910, outside his home in Lidingö he built and tested his Flugan on a circular wood track in his garden and on the ice during the wintertime. He worked with the help of professor Johan Erik Cederblom (1834-1913) at KTH in the development of wing profiles but did not succeed to get Flugan in the air. He also designed and built his own wind tunnel in order to test of small wing models. Flugan had a wingspan of 5 meters, and the surface area of the wings was 13 m^{2}. The engine was a steam engine of his own design, with a boiler heated by four of his blowtorches. It produced a maximum of 10 hp (7 kW) at 2000 rpm. The total weight of the plane was 80 kg.

== Images ==
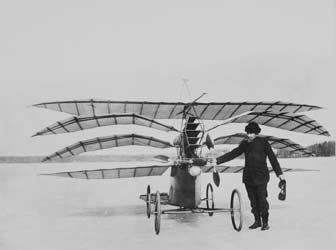
C.R. Nyberg and his steam engine driven airplane "Flugan" on the ice of Askrikefjärden north of Lidingö, Sweden.

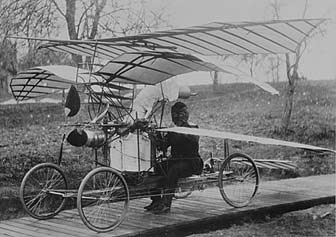
"Flugan" in a different version on the circular wooden track in his garden.

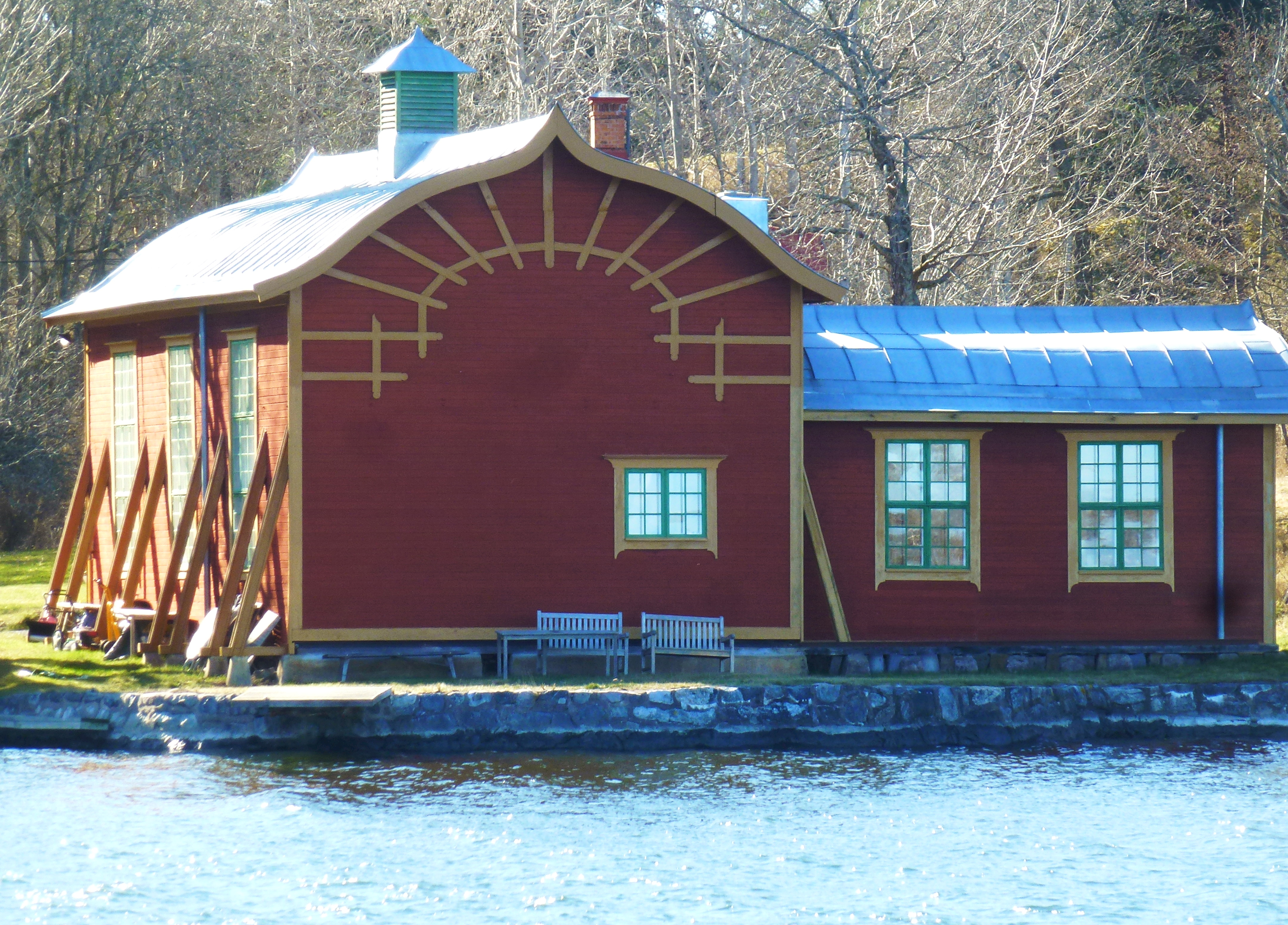
The waterfront hangar at Lidingö, erected 1908, where C.R. Nyberg housed Flugan and now is a listed building.

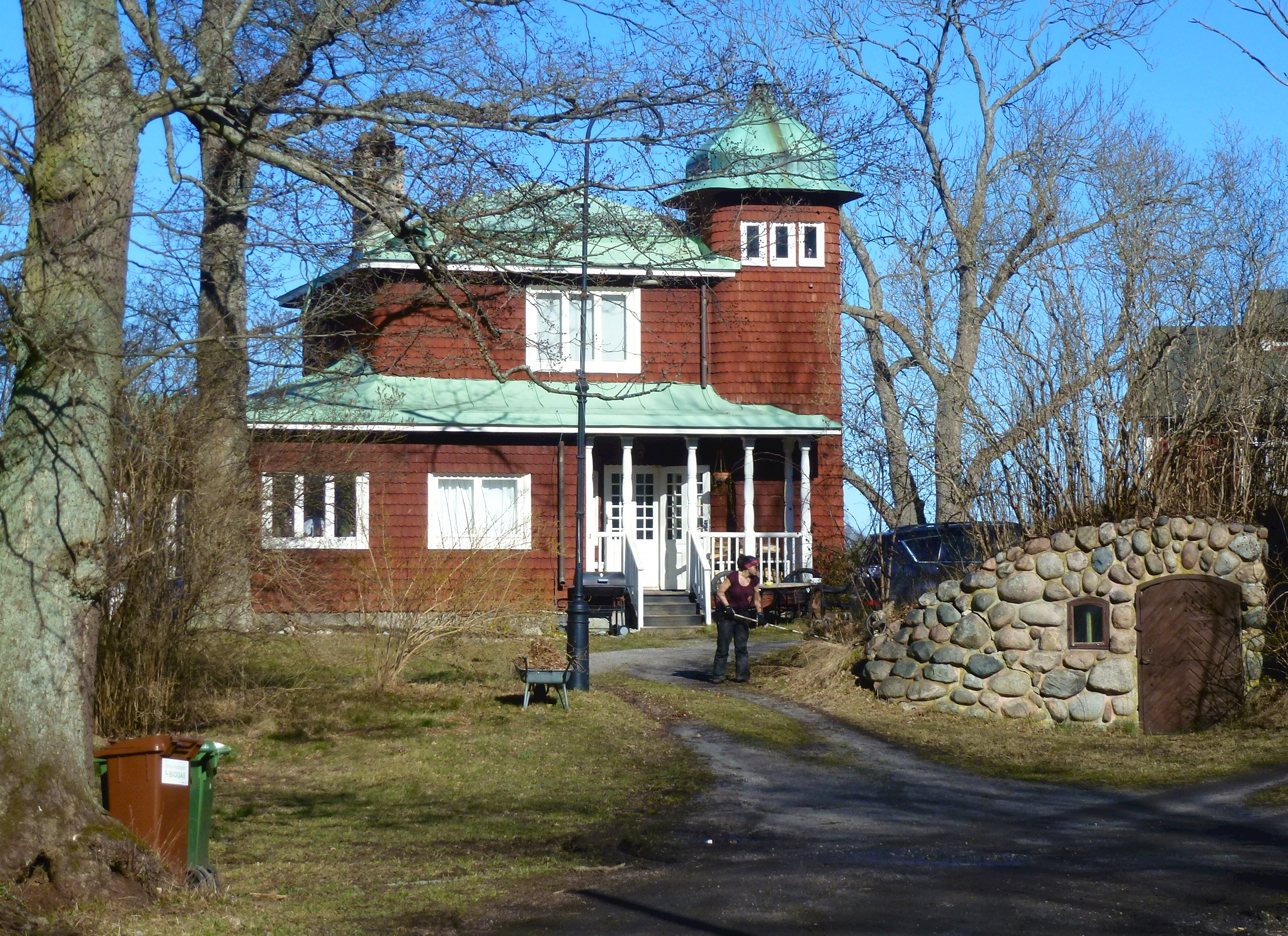
C.R. Nyberg's villa at Täcka Udden, Lidingö, 2020.

== Bibliography ==
- Jan, Forsgren (2023). "Raising Steam: Carl Richard Nyberg & his Steam-Powered Flying-Machines, 1898–1912". The Aviation Historian (43): 48–55. ISSN 2051-1930.
