= Blowtorch =

Fuel-burning tool for applying flame and heat for various applications

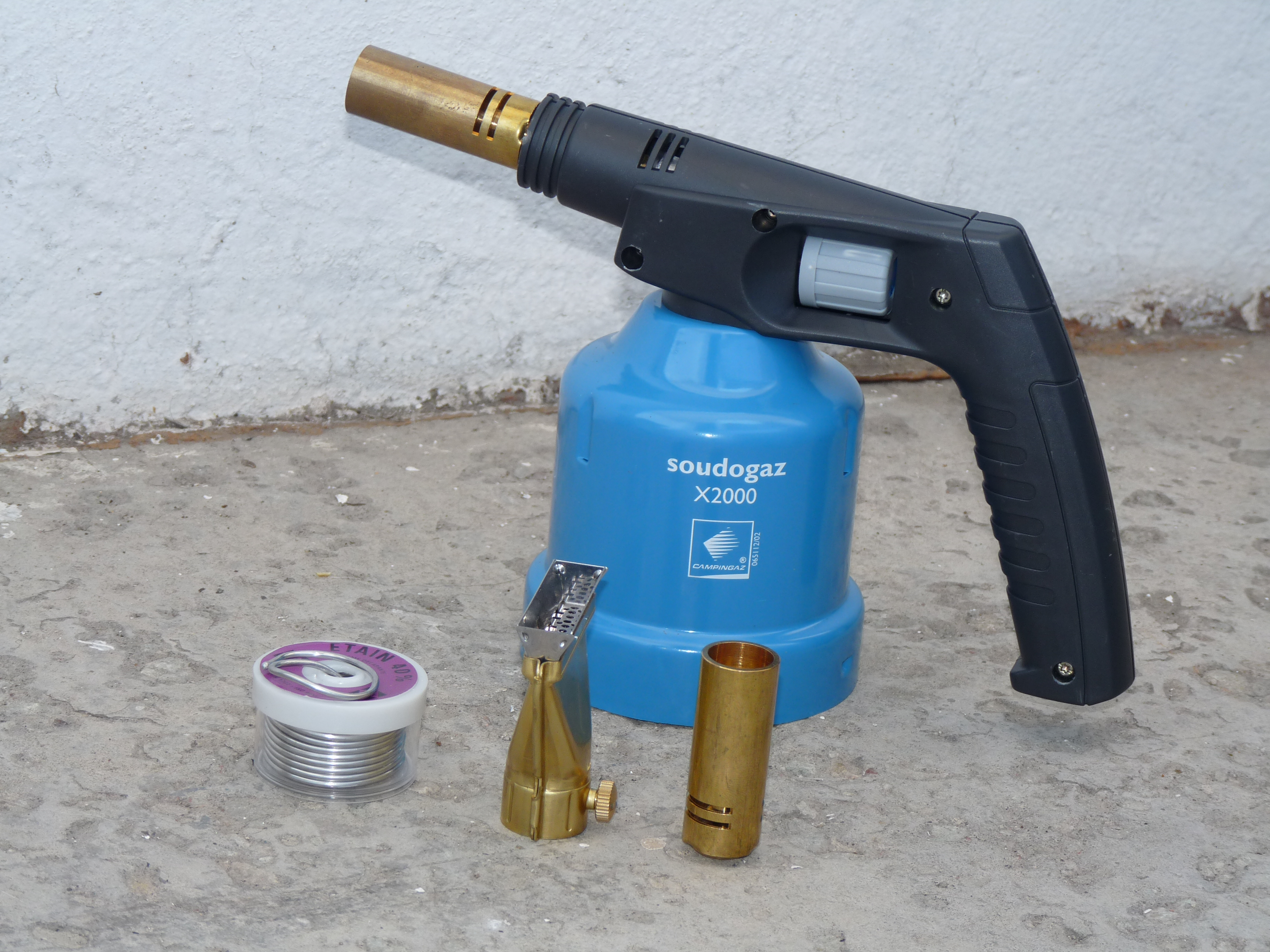
Modern gas blowtorch

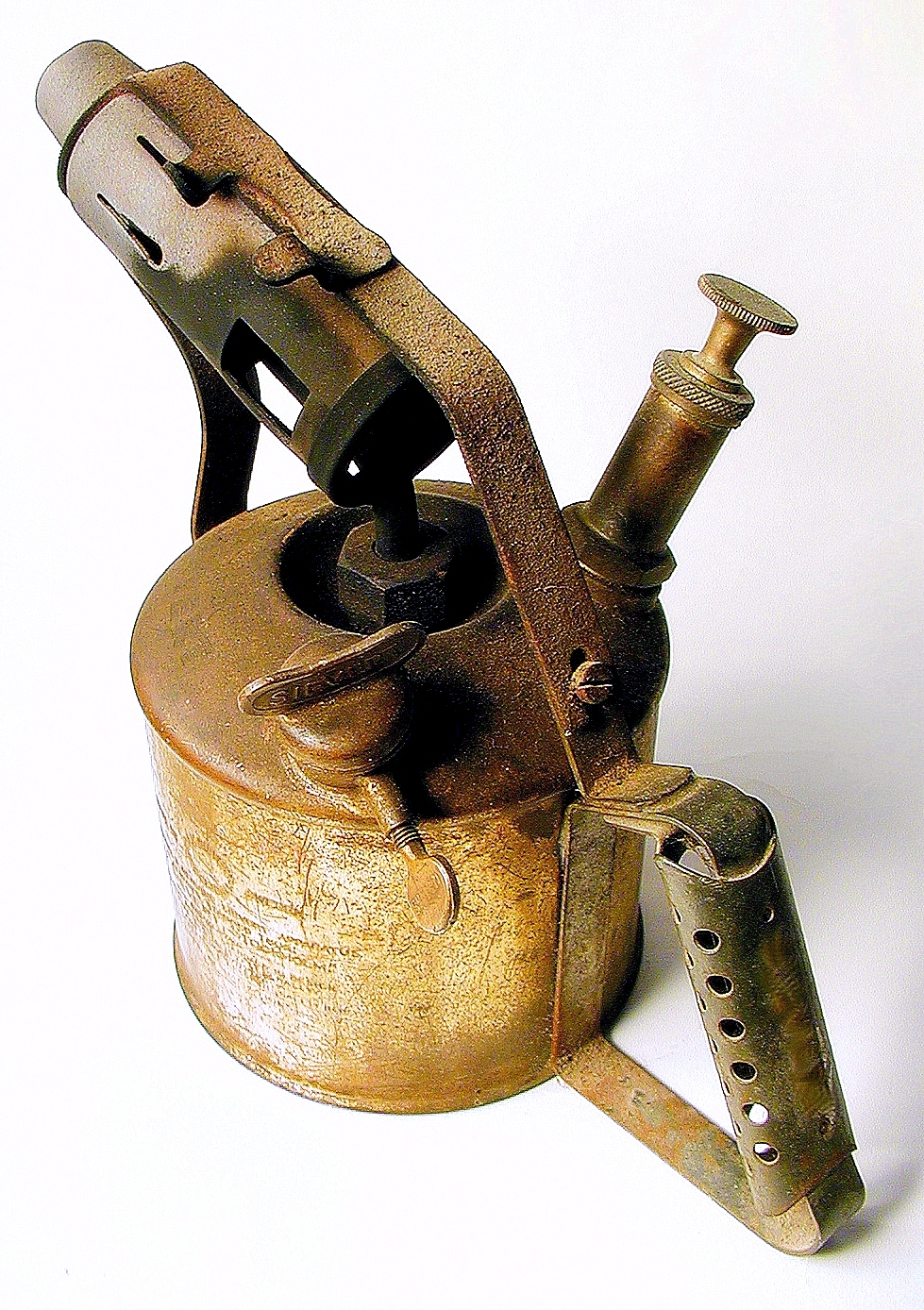
An old-fashioned kerosene/paraffin blowtorch

A blowtorch, also referred to as a blowlamp, is an ambient air fuel-burning tool used for applying flame and heat to various applications, usually in metalworking, but occasionally for foods like crème brûlée.

== Description ==
Early blowtorches used liquid fuel, carried in a refillable reservoir attached to the lamp. This is distinct from modern gas-fueled torches burning fuel such as a butane torch or propane torch. Their fuel reservoir is disposable or refillable by exchange. Liquid-fueled torches are pressurized by a piston hand pump, while gas torches are self-pressurized by the fuel evaporation. The term "blowtorch" is commonly misused as a name for any metalworking torch, but properly describes the pressurized liquid fuel torches that predate the common use of pressurized fuel gas cylinders.

Torches are available in a vast range of size and output power. The term "blowtorch" applies to the obsolescent style of smaller liquid fuel torches. Blowtorches are typically a single hand-held unit, with their draught supplied by a natural draught of air and the liquid fuel pressurized initially by hand plunger pump, then by regenerative heating once the torch is in operating state. The larger torches may have a heavy fuel reservoir placed on the ground, connected by a hose. This is common for butane- or propane-fuelled gas torches, but also applies to the older, large liquid paraffin (kerosene) torches such as the Wells light.

Many torches use a hose-supplied gas feed, which can be mains gas when used in industrial settings. They may also have a forced-air supply, from either an air blower or an oxygen cylinder. Both of these larger and more powerful designs are less commonly described as blowtorches, while the term blowtorch is usually reserved for the smaller and less powerful self-contained torches. The archaic term "blowpipe" is sometimes still used in relation to oxy-acetylene welding torches.

== History ==
The blowtorch is of ancient origin and was used as a tool by goldsmiths and silversmiths. They began literally as a "blown lamp", a wick oil lamp with a mouth-blown tube alongside the flame. This type of lamp, with spirit fuel, continued to be in use for such small tasks into the late 20th century.

In 1797, German inventor August von Marquardt invented a blowtorch in Eberswalde.

Another early blow pipe patent comes from the US, dated May 13, 1856.

In 1882, a new vaporizing technique was developed by Carl Richard Nyberg in Sweden, and the year after, the production of the Nyberg blowtorch started. It was quickly copied or licensed by many other manufacturers.

The US version of the blowtorch was independently developed with a distinctive flared base and was fueled by gasoline, whereas the European versions used kerosene for safety and low cost.

After the Korean War in the 1950s, wider availability of propane caused many changes in the blowtorch industry worldwide, and by the 1970s most manufacturers of the old type of blowtorch, using gasoline or kerosene as fuel, had disappeared. There remain several manufacturers producing brass blowtorches in India, China and North Korea for markets where propane gas is difficult to obtain or too expensive to be viable.

== Applications ==
The blowtorch is commonly used where a diffuse (wide spread) high temperature naked flame heat is required but not so hot as to cause combustion or welding. Temperature applications are soldering, brazing, softening paint for removal, melting roof tar, or pre-heating large castings before welding such as for repairing. It is also common for use in weed control by controlled burn methods, and for melting snow and ice from pavements and driveways in cold climate areas. Especially the US and Canada, road repair crews may use a blowtorch to heat asphalt or bitumen for repairing cracks in preventive maintenance. It is also used in cooking: a butane torch may be used to create the layer of hard caramelized sugar in a crème brûlée.

== Types and variants ==
The blowtorch is referred to in industry and trade according to the fuel consumed by the tool:

- Gas:
  - propane gas, see propane torch
  - MAPP gas
  - butane gas, see butane torch
  - liquefied petroleum gas (LPG) with ambient atmospheric air via a replaceable LPG cylinder.
  - Oxyacetylene torch
- Liquid, with ambient atmospheric air after vaporizing it using a coiled tube passing through the flame. They take time to start, needing pre-heating with burning methylated spirit:
  - kerosene as described in Carl Richard Nyberg's patent of 1882: a simple heating torch using liquid fuel (such as kerosene (US) / paraffin oil (UK)).
  - diesel
  - biodiesel

In terms of gas torches, the fuel tank often is small and also serves as the handle. It is usually refueled by changing the fuel tank with the liquefied gas in it. The variants with gaseous fuel are sometimes fed from an LPG cylinder via a hose.

== Variant ==
A flame gun is a large type of blowlamp with built-in fuel tank, used for various purposes: weed control by controlled burn methods, melting snow and ice off walk and driveways in the winter, starting a fire, etc. It is commonly confused in word usage with a flamethrower.

== Media ==
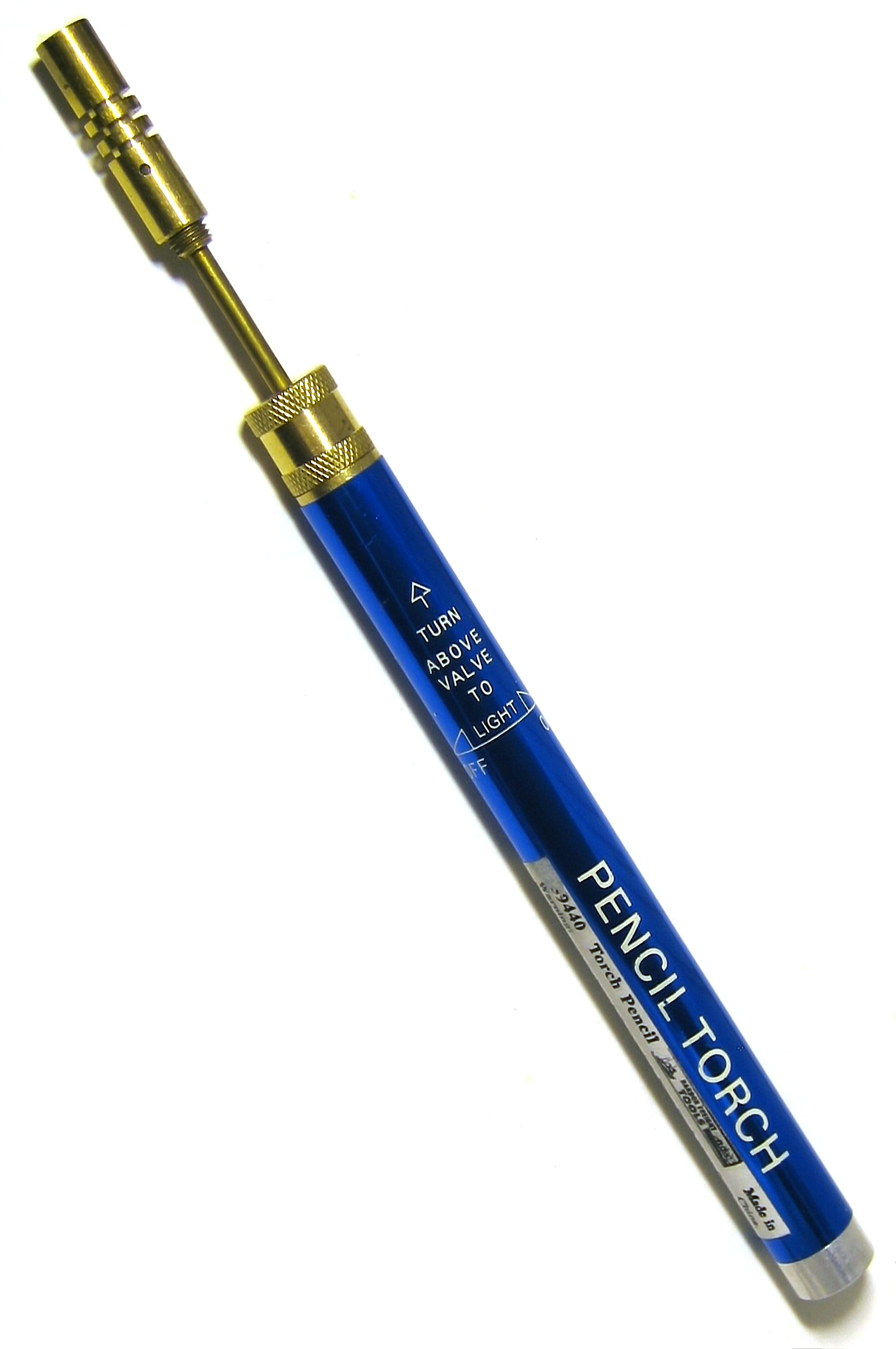
A small butane torch

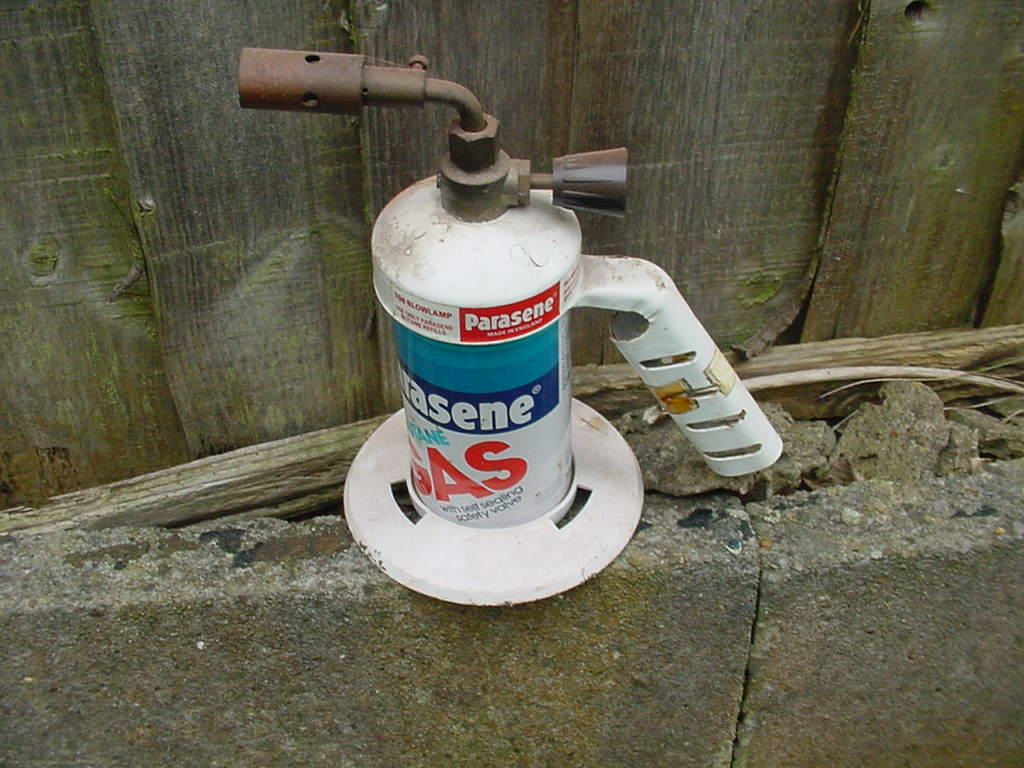
Handheld butane blowtorch

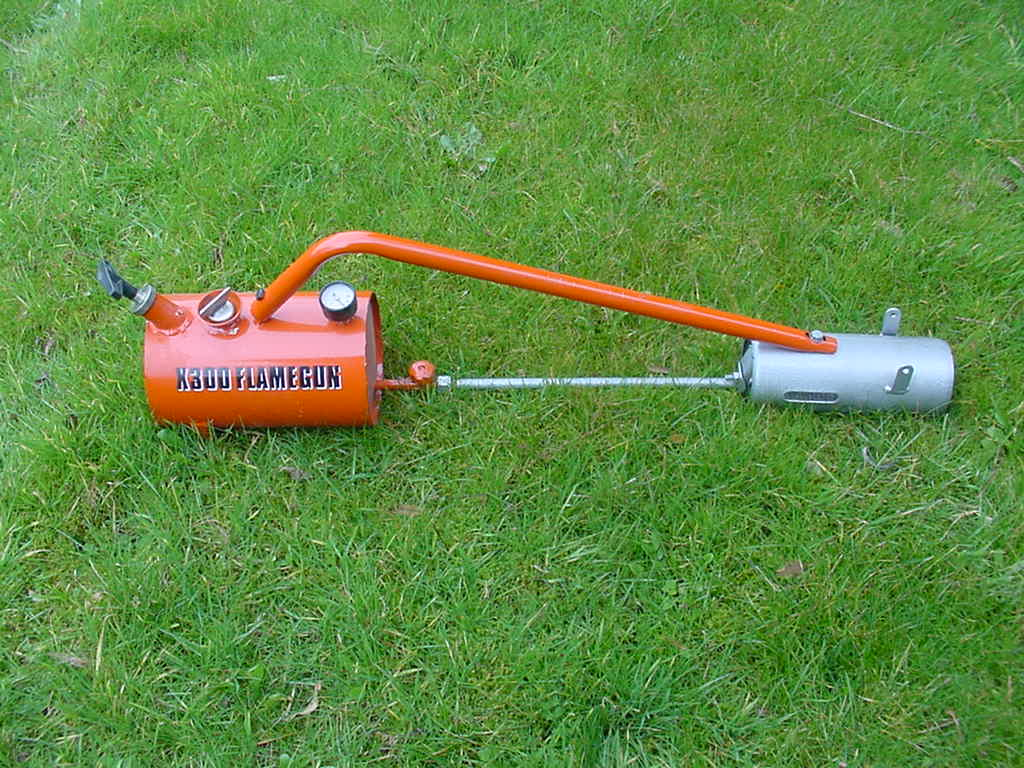
Modern paraffin flame gun, 3 feet 3 inches = 1 m long

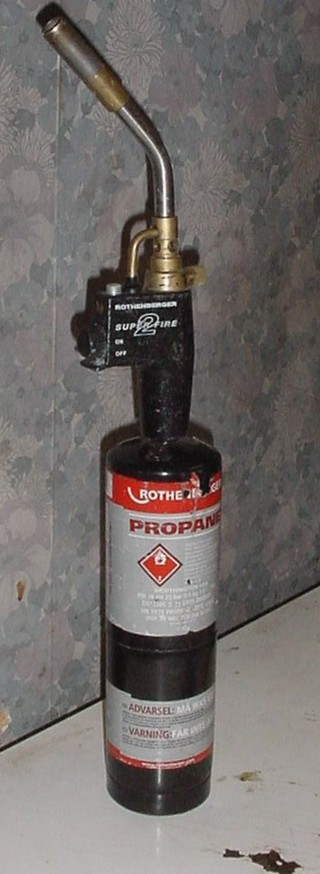
Handheld propane blowtorch

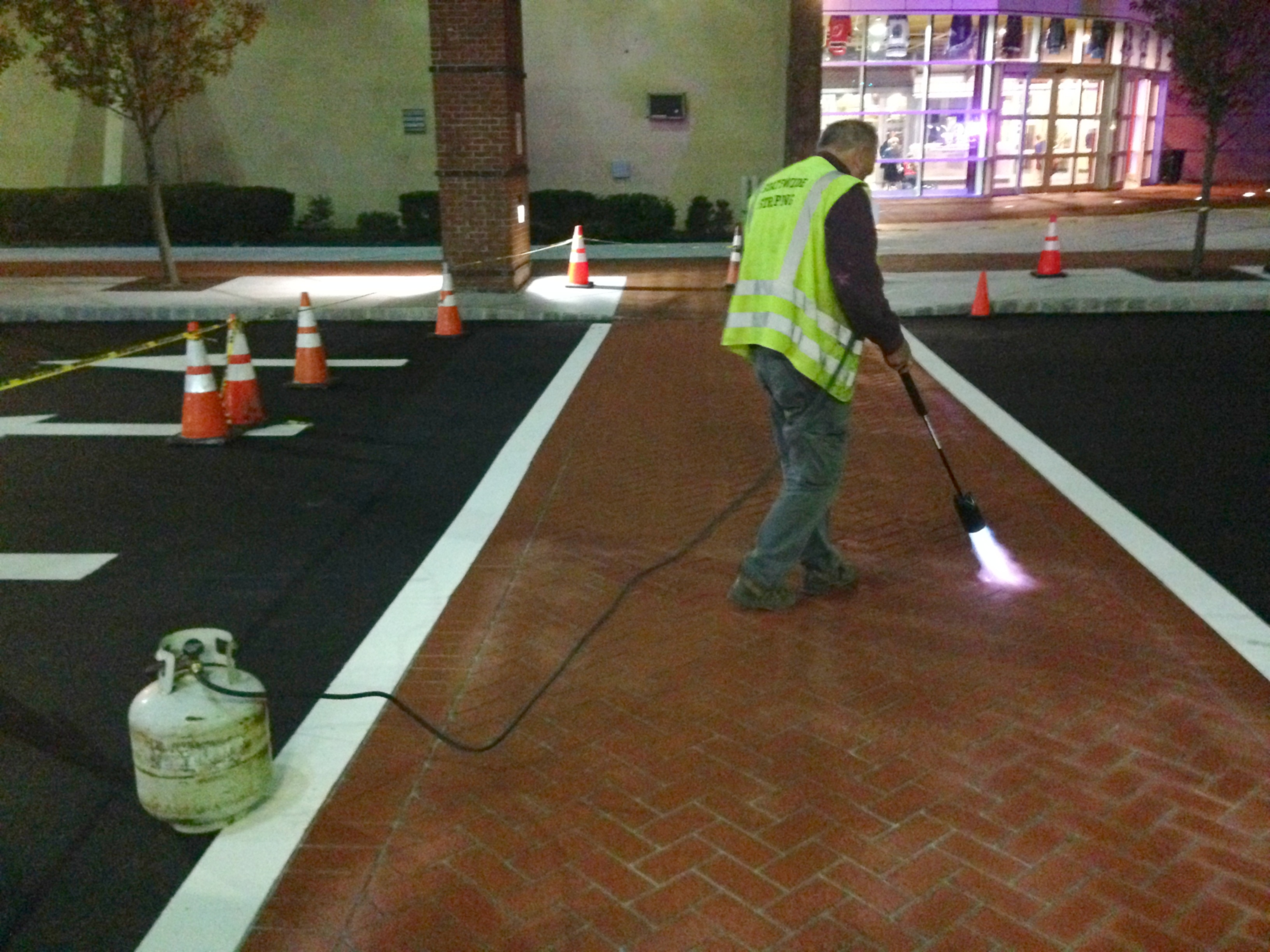
Large propane torch used for construction

== See also ==
- Butane torch
- Gas burner
- Oxy-fuel welding and cutting
- Plasma torch
- Propane torch
