= Katahdin (disambiguation) =

Katahdin is a mountain in Piscataquis County, Maine, US.

Katahdin may also refer to:

- Katahdin Falls, tallest waterfall in Maine
- Arctic Katahdin Butterfly
- Katahdin sheep, a breed of domestic sheep developed in Maine
- Katahdin Iron Works, a Maine state historic site
- Katadhin (steamboat), a steamboat on Moosehead Lake
- USS Katahdin, two United States Navy vessels

== See also ==
- Katahdin Woods and Waters National Monument, a National Monument adjacent to Mount Katahdin
