= Caribou Mountain (Franklin County, Maine) =

Mountain in the United States and Canada

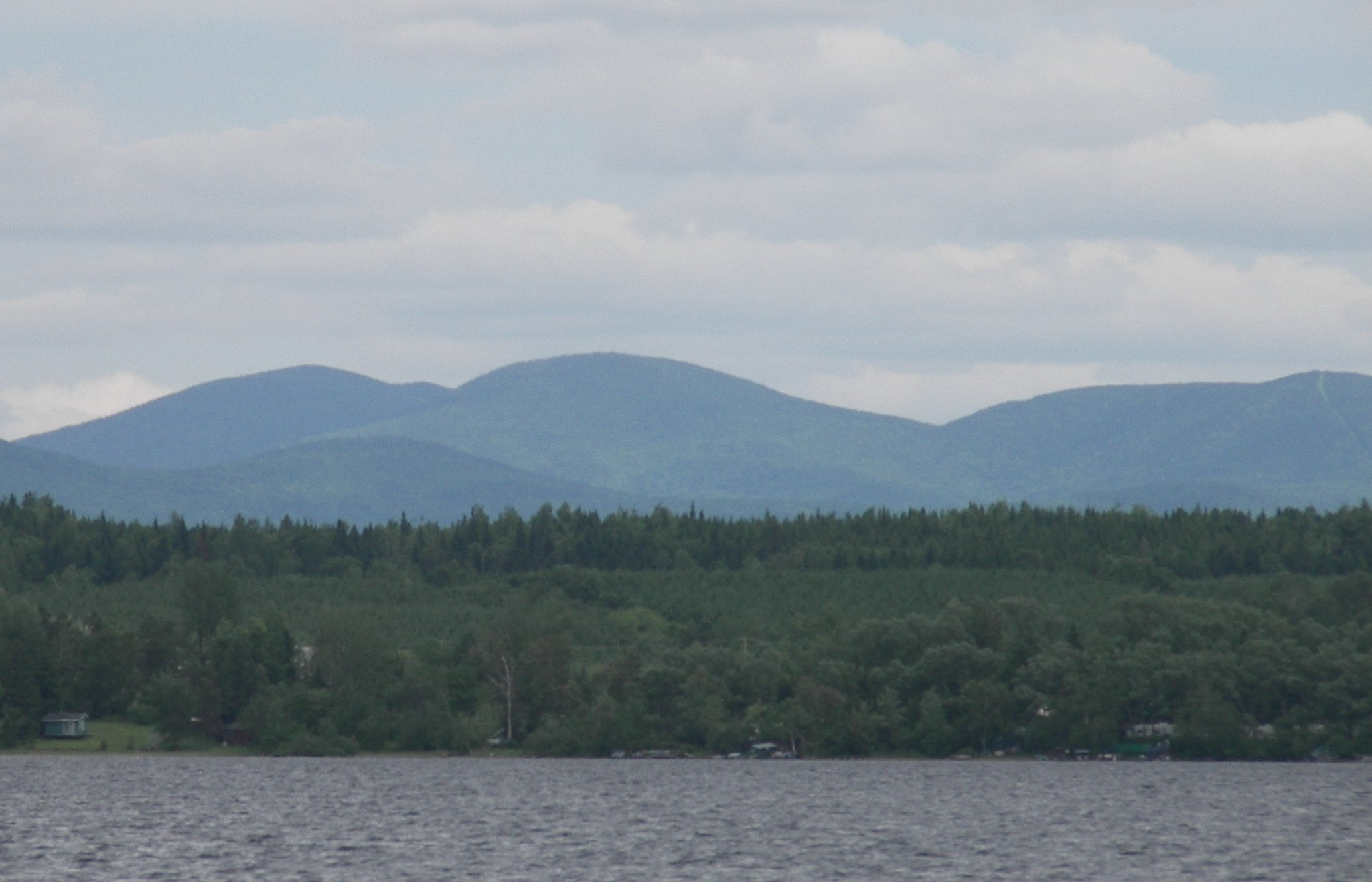

Highest point
- Elevation: 3,650 ft (1,110 m)
- Prominence: 1,230 ft (370 m)
- Listing: New England Fifty Finest #26
- Coordinates: 45°25′47″N 70°37′23″W

Geography
- Location within Maine Location within Quebec
- Location: Franklin County, Maine, U.S.
- Topo map: USGS Kibby Mountain

Caribou Mountain is a mountain on the Canada–United States border, the section of which follows the height of land of the Saint Lawrence River watershed. The peak is located about 0.5 mi (0.80 km) inside Franklin County, Maine. The southwest end of Caribou's summit ridge is in Le Granit Regional County Municipality, Québec.

The northwest side of Caribou Mountain drains into the West Branch of the Moose River, thence into the South Branch of the Moose, the Moose River, and the Kennebec River, then into the Gulf of Maine. The southeast side of Caribou Mountain drains into Number Six Brook, then into the South Branch of the Moose River. The southwest end of Caribou Mountain drains into Rivière aux Araignées in Saint-Augustin-de-Woburn, Quebec, then into Lac aux Araignées, Lac Mégantic, the Rivière Chaudière, the Saint Lawrence River, and into the Gulf of Saint Lawrence.

== Climate ==
Climate data for Caribou Mountain 45.4339 N, 70.6157 W, Elevation: 3,327 ft (1,014 m) (1991–2020 normals)
Month	Jan	Feb	Mar	Apr	May	Jun	Jul	Aug	Sep	Oct	Nov	Dec	Year
Mean daily maximum °F (°C)	14.7 (−9.6)	16.8 (−8.4)	25.7 (−3.5)	40.6 (4.8)	54.8 (12.7)	64.1 (17.8)	68.6 (20.3)	66.8 (19.3)	60.0 (15.6)	46.7 (8.2)	32.2 (0.1)	20.8 (−6.2)	42.7 (5.9)
Daily mean °F (°C)	7.2 (−13.8)	9.1 (−12.7)	18.7 (−7.4)	32.2 (0.1)	46.5 (8.1)	56.0 (13.3)	60.6 (15.9)	58.9 (14.9)	51.5 (10.8)	38.1 (3.4)	26.3 (−3.2)	12.4 (−10.9)	34.8 (1.5)
Mean daily minimum °F (°C)	−0.2 (−17.9)	1.5 (−16.9)	11.6 (−11.3)	23.9 (−4.5)	38.3 (3.5)	47.9 (8.8)	52.6 (11.4)	50.9 (10.5)	42.9 (6.1)	29.5 (−1.4)	20.4 (−6.4)	4.0 (−15.6)	26.9 (−2.8)
Average precipitation inches (mm)	4.47 (114)	4.04 (103)	4.24 (108)	4.89 (124)	4.79 (122)	6.55 (166)	5.70 (145)	5.16 (131)	4.43 (113)	7.35 (187)	4.32 (110)	5.36 (136)	61.3 (1,559)
Source: PRISM Climate Group

== See also ==
- List of mountains in Maine
- New England Fifty Finest
