= Carabus chamissonis =

Scientific classification
- Domain: Eukaryota
- Kingdom: Animalia
- Phylum: Arthropoda
- Class: Insecta
- Order: Coleoptera
- Suborder: Adephaga
- Family: Carabidae
- Genus: Carabus
- Species: C. chamissonis

Binomial name
- Carabus chamissonis Fischer von Waldheim, 1820

Synonyms
- Carabus rugosostrigatus Mandl, 1955; Carabus washingtoni Casey, 1920; Carabus groenlandicus Dejean, 1831; Carabus brachyderus Wiedemann, 1821

Species of beetle

Carabus chamissonis, Fisher's worm and slug hunter, is a species of ground beetle in the family Carabidae. It is found in tundra regions across northern Canada and Alaska, as well as isolated populations on Mount Washington, New Hampshire and Katahdin in Maine. This is a species of open, dry tundra environments - generally better drained than those occupied in the Arctic by Carabus truncaticollis

Adults are brachypterous and nocturnal. Adults overwinter in their own pupal cavity.
