= Lowelltown, Maine =

Town in the US state of Maine

Location within the State of Maine

Lowelltown is a township in the North Franklin Unorganized Territory of Franklin County, Maine. It is located 3 miles from the border between Maine and Canada, and is situated on Moose River. Its village center contains a handful of homesteads and is right along the retired line of International Railway of Maine at the end of Lowelltown Road.

== Geography ==
The township is in Moose River Valley and is bordered to the North by Gorham Gore, to the east by Holeb Township, to the South by Skinner Township and to the West by Beattie Township. It is 20 miles away from the nearest organized towns of Jackman and Moose River in Somerset County. The township is mainly within the Moose River marshlands, but contains Clear Pond Mountain, Caswell Mountain and the settlements of Skinner Village and Keough. It is within the boundaries of the Passamaquoddy Trust Land of Western Maine.

== History ==
Lowelltown began as an unorganized unpopulated place originally platted as Township 1 Range 8 in Franklin County, it was platted in the 1860s. It started to become populated later on in the 1860s due to the high value and amount of lumber in the area, and was set up as a lumber camp just as its nearby communities of Holeb and Attean.

At the time when it was first settled it was just called Lowell, named so after the city of Lowell in Massachusetts. As the lumber boom grew throughout the 1870s and 1880s, so did the community of Lowelltown with the settlement growing to 10-12 families. Vast lots of woodland started being cleared around this time and being shipped all over Maine via boat down Moose River East to Moosehead Lake, then South to the ocean via Kennebec River where the timbers would come to the port in Phippsburg.

Lowelltown started to become one of the major logging settlements of the Moose River Valley and began to send out more and more lumber all over the state. Although in 1890 when the International Railway of Maine finished laying its tracks which began when Canadian Pacific Railway expanded from Lac Megantic to Mattawamkeag, the Maine portion of the railway started at Lowelltown's border with Quebec and ventured through what would become Skinner Township, Holeb Township, through Jackman and connecting Moose River Valley with the rest of Maine in Mattawamkeag.

The township did not start calling itself Lowelltown until the early 20th century, it did so to differentiate it with the organized town of Lowell in Penobscot County. Lowelltown began to see growth as the railroad created much easier and faster shipment of logs all throughout the state. The townsfolk built their own train station and seized their opportunity to grow. The township had grown to possibly 20-30 families by 1900 and retained a relatively big population for the area for quite a few decades.

In 1908 during a drought there was a fire that burned down the Mills in Lowelltown and Skinner. Before the fire, Lowelltown had about 800 residents and both Lowelltown and Skinner had many amenities such as Mills, schools, churches and general stores as well as post offices, however neither ended up coming back in manner of population.

Another disastrous storm doomed the region in 1917 where a terrifying storm with torrential rain, thunder and lightning caused water levels of Moose River along with the ponds in the valley to rise by 8 feet. The storm caused travel to stop, contaminated drinking water with ground water, the dam went out at Skinner, the covered bridge in Lowelltown was washed out and railroad ties were pulled from the ground.

However, in the 1950s, the rail line through Moose River Valley began to see a traffic decline. With the lumber industry evolving, and seeing the innovation that truck shipment created, there began to be a decline in the need for lumber camps such as Lowelltown and Skinner. Both started seeing a loss of population to the bigger towns of Jackman and Eustis. Nowadays, there are only 4 homesteads left in Lowelltown and the locality of Keough, which was an old lumber camp by a train stop in the east of the township that has been fully abandoned.
