= East Branch Moose River (Maine) =

Location
- Country: United States

Physical characteristics
- Source
  - location: Maine
  - elevation: 2,500 feet (760 m)
- Mouth
  - location: South Branch Moose River
  - coordinates: 45°27′24″N 70°33′39″W
  - elevation: 1,930 feet (590 m)
- Length: about 3 miles (5 km)

Basin features
- Progression: South Branch Moose River – Moose River – Moosehead Lake – Kennebec River

The East Branch Moose River is a short tributary of the South Branch Moose River in Skinner (Maine Township 1, Range 7, WBKP), Maine. From its source (45°26′15″N 70°30′41″W) on Kibby Mountain, the river runs 3.1 miles (5.0 km) northwest to its confluence with the Moose River's South Branch.

== See also ==
- List of rivers of Maine
