= Kibby Mountain =

Mountain in Maine, United States

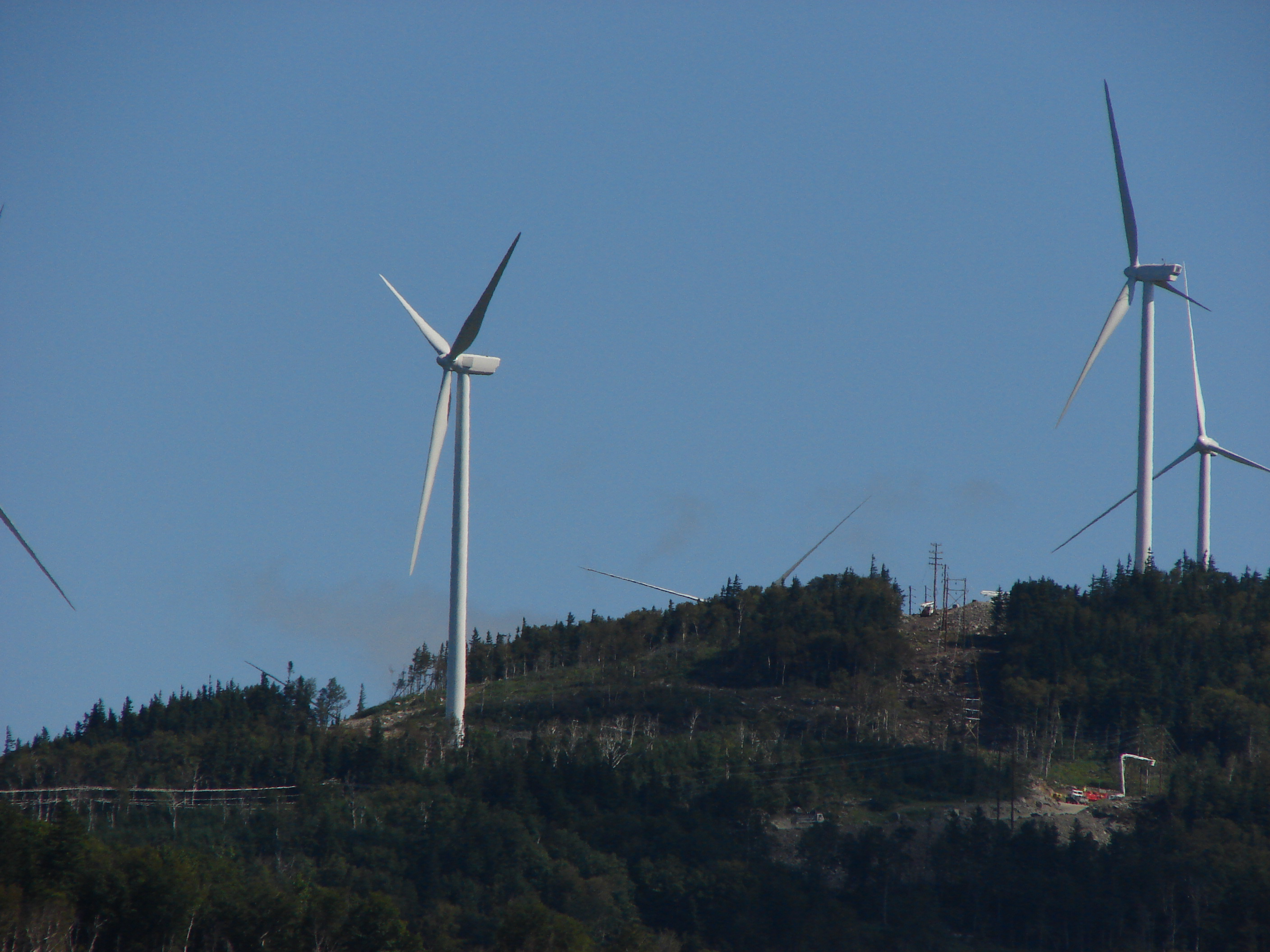
- The new wind turbines

Highest point
- Elevation: 3,654 ft (1,114 m) NGVD 29
- Prominence: 2,260 ft (690 m)
- Listing: #26 New England Fifty Finest
- Coordinates: 45°25′07″N 70°32′40″W

Geography
- Location within Maine
- Location: Franklin County, Maine, U.S.
- Topo map: USGS Kibby Mountain

Kibby Mountain is a mountain located in Franklin County, Maine, about 3.5 mi (5.6 km) east of the Canada–United States border. Kibby Mountain is flanked to the southeast by Spencer Bale Mountain.

Kibby Mountain stands within the watershed of the Kennebec River, which drains into the Gulf of Maine. The north side of Kibby Mountain drains into the East Branch of the Moose River, then into the South Branch of the Moose, the Moose River, and the Kennebec River. The west side of Kibby Mountain drains into Caribou Flow, then into the South Branch of the Moose River. The southwest end of Kibby Mountain drains into the Middle Branch of Kibby Stream, then into Spencer Stream and the Dead River, another tributary of the Kennebec. The southeast side of Kibby Mountain drains into the West Branch of Spencer Stream.

The Kibby Wind Power Project is located on the mountain.
