= USS Katahdin =

Two vessels of the United States Navy have been named USS Katahdin, after Mount Katahdin.

- USS Katahdin (1861), was a screw gunboat commissioned in early 1862, active throughout the American Civil War, and decommissioned shortly after war's end
- USS Katahdin (1893), was an ironclad ram in service from 1897 to 1909

== See also ==
- Katahdin (steamboat)
- Katahdin (disambiguation)
