= West Branch Moose River (Maine) =

Location
- Country: United States

Physical characteristics
- Source
  - location: Maine
  - elevation: 3,100 feet (940 m)
- Mouth
  - location: South Branch Moose River
  - coordinates: 45°27′32″N 70°33′42″W
  - elevation: 1,930 feet (590 m)
- Length: 6 miles (10 km)

Basin features
- Progression: South Branch Moose River – Moose River – Moosehead Lake – Kennebec River

The West Branch Moose River is a short tributary of the South Branch Moose River in Franklin County, Maine. Its source (45°25′58″N 70°37′46″W) is on Caribou Mountain in Merrill Strip (Maine Township 2, Range 7, WBKP), about 2,000 feet (600 m) from the Canada–United States border, which runs along the height of land between the watersheds of the Kennebec River in Maine and the Chaudière River in Quebec. From there, the river runs 5.9 miles (9.5 km) northeast to its confluence with the Moose River's South Branch in Skinner (T1, R7, WBKP).

== See also ==
- List of rivers of Maine
