= Oeneis rosovi =

Scientific classification
- Domain: Eukaryota
- Kingdom: Animalia
- Phylum: Arthropoda
- Class: Insecta
- Order: Lepidoptera
- Family: Nymphalidae
- Genus: Oeneis
- Species: O. rosovi

Binomial name
- Oeneis rosovi Kurentzov, 1970

Synonyms
- Oeneis norna rosovi

Species of butterfly

Oeneis rosovi, the Philip's Arctic or early Arctic, is a species of butterfly in the subfamily Satyrinae. It occurs in Siberia and the northern parts of North America.

== Description ==
The wing span of O. rosovi is 42 to 52 mm. The dorsal wings are dark grey brown, with orange patches near the wing margins. The upperside of the hindwings are a darker grey medially.

== Distribution ==
Oeneis rosovi occurs in northern British Columbia, in central Yukon, at Inuvik, Northwest Territories, and westward through Alaska to eastern Siberia.

== Similar species ==
Polixenes Arctic (O. polixenes)
