= Westbury Hill Fair =

Annual fair in Wiltshire, England

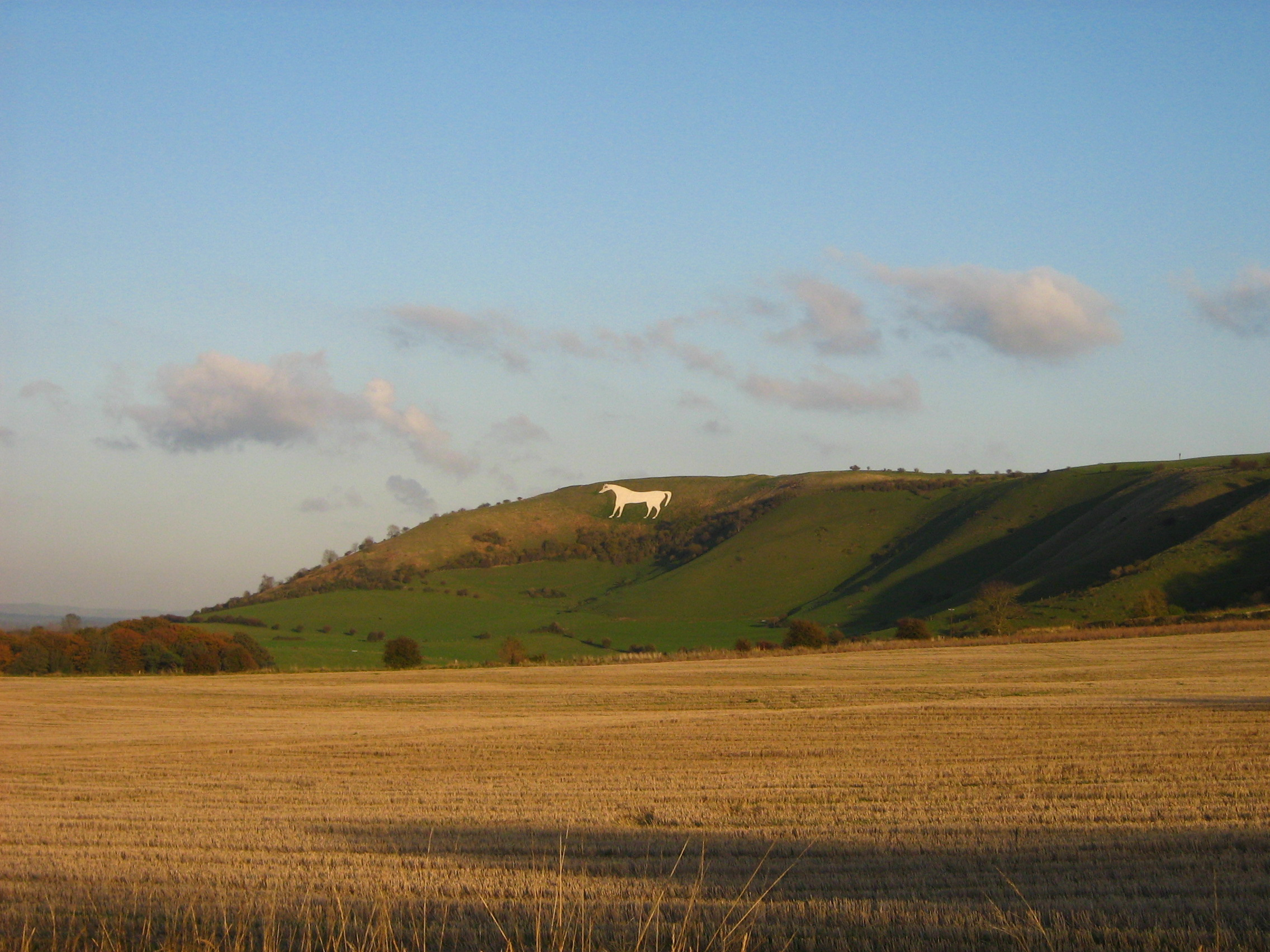
The fairground was above the Westbury White Horse

The Westbury Hill Fair, or Westbury Hill Sheep Fair, was an annual fair which took place on the first Tuesday in September on high ground at Westbury, Wiltshire, England, near the north-western corner of Salisbury Plain. The main business was the sale of sheep. The fair was well-established by the mid 19th century and had come to an end by 1942.

== History ==
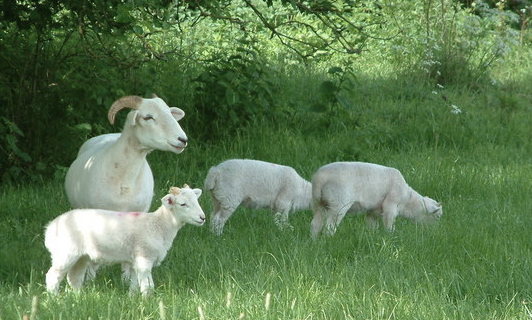
Wiltshire Horn sheep

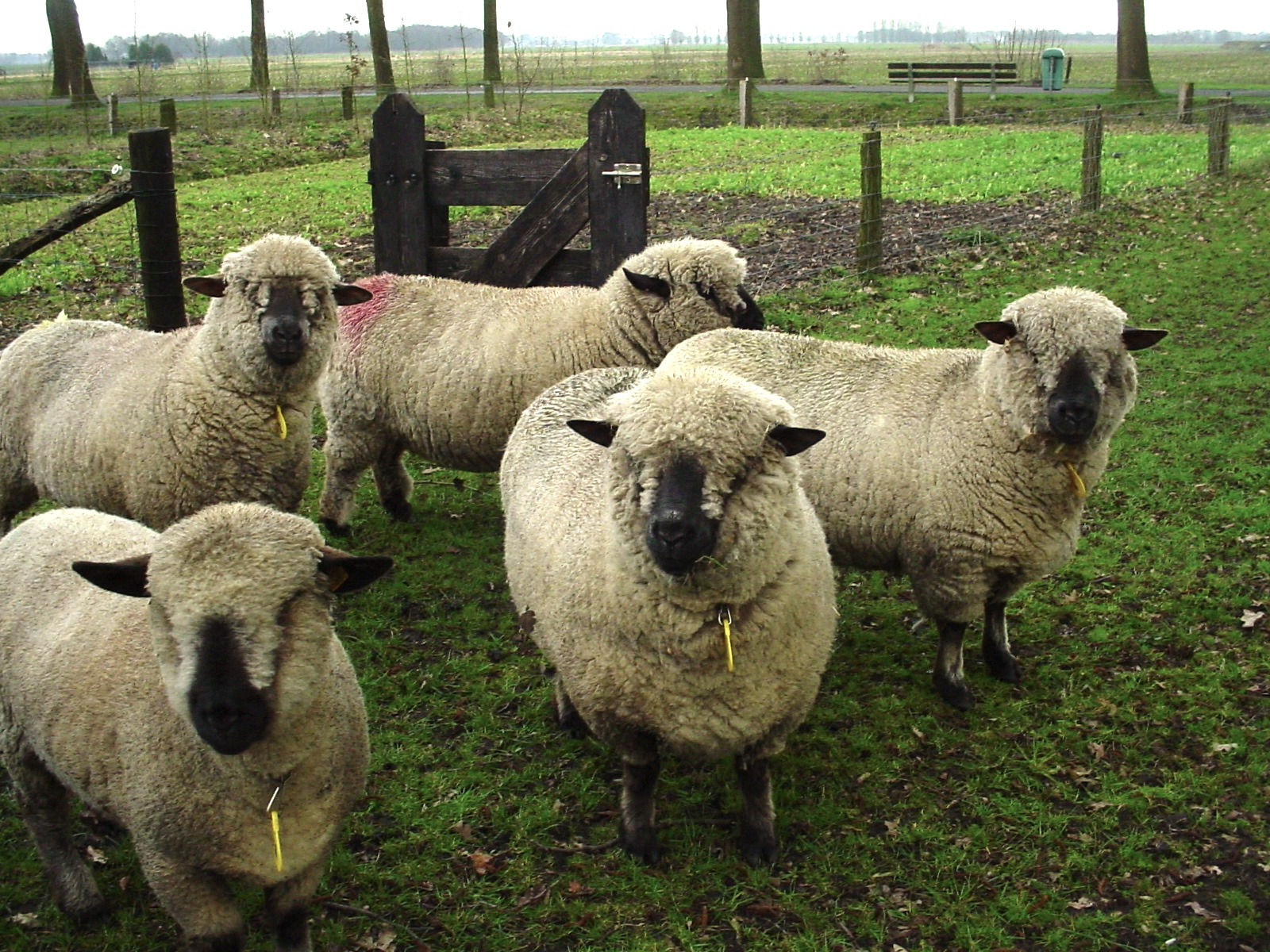
Hampshire Down ewes

The origins of the Westbury Hill Fair are uncertain, but according to one source a bequest was made in 1775 to provide a guinea once a year to pay for a sermon to warn the young people of the nearby village of Bratton against the dangers of the Hill Fair. This is evidence that by then an annual fair already existed in some form.

In all the records of it, the chief business at the fair was the sale of sheep, and as with all country fairs there were also other entertainments and goods for sale. The site of the fair was downland near the Westbury White Horse, known as Westbury Hill, a slow uphill climb if coming up from the town below, or a long journey if travelling across Salisbury Plain. The breeds of sheep traded included the Hampshire Down, the Southdown, and in earlier days the Wiltshire Horn. In its heyday, the fair rivalled a similar sheep fair held at Wilton. The fair at Westbury benefited from the opening in 1853 of the Westbury station on the Wilts, Somerset and Weymouth Railway, and as Westbury became established as the junction of the Reading to Taunton line with what is now the Wessex Main Line, its transport links improved. However, the Wilton sheep fair also grew during the 19th century, with 40,000 sheep reported from there in 1883, a figure rising to some 95,000 in 1901.

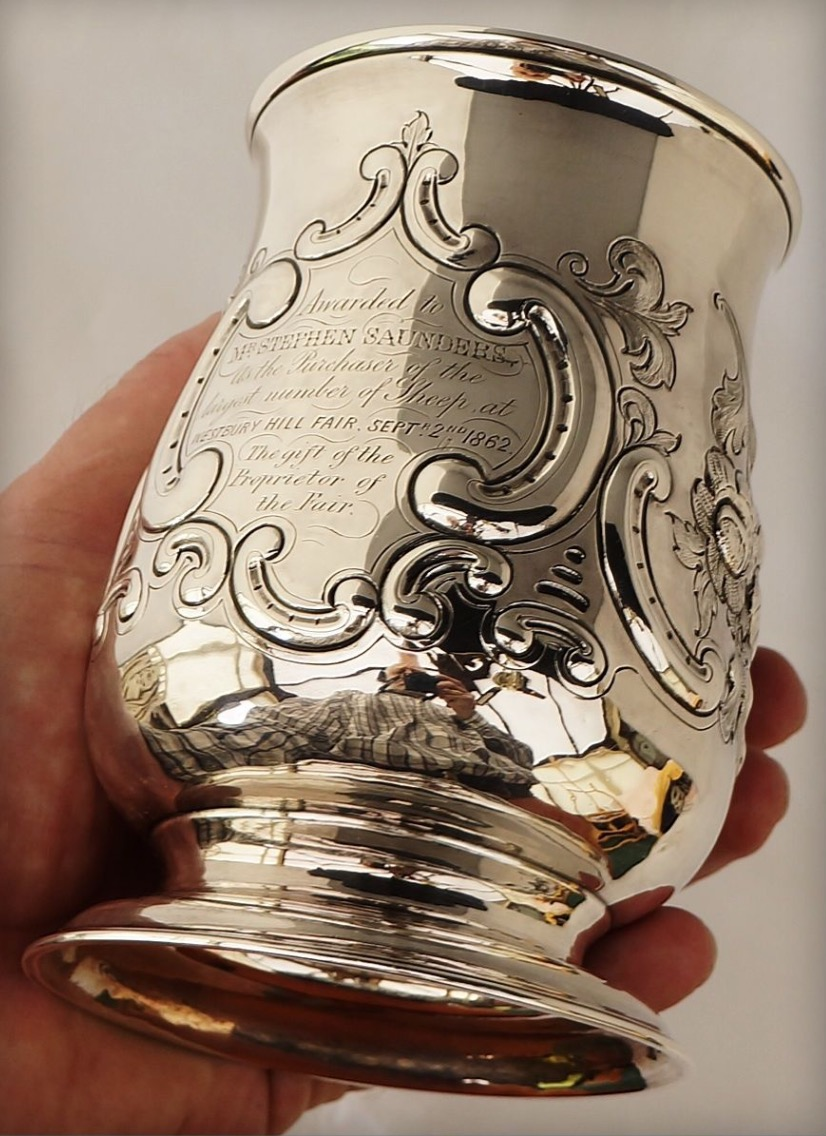
The Hill Fair tankard of 1862, with inscription reading "Awarded to MR. STEPHEN SAUNDERS as the Purchaser of the largest number of Sheep at WESTBURY HILL FAIR. SEPTR. 2ND. 1862. The gift of the Proprietor of the Fair"

Notice was given of a Westbury Hill Sheep Fair in September in the Salisbury and Winchester Journal of 20 August 1853. In September 1862 the owner of the Westbury Hill Fair gave a silver tankard (pictured) to the buyer of the largest number of sheep. On 11 September 1868 The Welshman reported that "This week several important fairs and markets have been held, and from each and all the report is a very dull trade, at barely the recently improved rates. Thus at Westbury-hill fair there was a very large supply of sheep – the largest ever known but the trade was heavy, and a clearance could not be made."

In the 1870s, the fair was reported as a large annual event and was held on the first Tuesday in September. In September 1872 the Salisbury and Winchester Journal reported the sale of good lambs and ewes from Imber, Norton Bavant, Knook, Chitterne, Heytesbury, and Sutton Veny, with "most of the primest of the ram Iambs making 6 guineas each". In 1882 applications for entry to the Westbury Hill Sheep Fair were to be made to Mr. W. Beaven at Pound Farm, Westbury.

In 1890, the Devizes and Wiltshire Gazette noted that the fair was shrinking in size and reported that "trade was dull and slow", but Mr Justice Lopes had done well in making thirty shillings each for a hundred mixed lambs. By the end of the 19th century, it was noticed that the fair caused low attendance at local schools, including that at nearby Dilton Marsh.

== Twentieth century decline ==
In the early 20th century, the fair continued to decline, with only some 20,000 sheep passing through it every year. In 1912 a notice for the fair appeared in the London Standard, announcing "Westbury Hill Fair: Pedigree Hampshire Down Sheep a Speciality".

On 6 September 1924, a local newspaper reported "Successful Hill Fair. — Westbury Hill Fair was held in ideal weather on Tuesday, and attracted not only a large company of farmers and dealers but also a large number of the fair sex and children." At this time, sheep were commonly sold on a handshake, with the price to be paid later. Horses were also traded, with some being sent from Ireland by boat and train, to be walked up the hill from Westbury railway station. Some local schools were closed on the day of the fair. Gypsies camped for the summer at Beggar's Knoll to work on the hill farms and came to the fair to sell clothes pegs and paper flowers. Dealers came for the day to sell crockery, cutlery, and other wares.

In 1939, one of the auctioneers for the Fair, held on 5 September, was Dart & Son of Warminster. In 1940, in the early months of the Second World War, the Land Utilisation Survey noted that "Westbury's Sheep Fair today handles less than 10,000 sheep". That year's Fair took place on 3 September 1940, and another of the firms of auctioneers, Lavington & Hooper, advertised a few days before that 1,650 Hampshire Downs had been entered with them for sale. In 1941, the same auctioneers advertised their sale at the Fair to start at 8:30 am on 2 September, with 1,275 Hampshire Down and cross-bred Ewes and Lambs having been entered by 16 August. A retrospective in the Wiltshire Times of 29 August 1942 noted that

"In September came the last event of our year — Westbury Hill Sheep Fair. Thousands of sheep changed hands, and the village roads were frequently blocked with flocks moving slowly to their destination. Sheep-washing in Bratton stream ceased nearly thirty years ago. Even before the war, Westbury Hill Fair had dwindled into a comparatively small event."

After that, no traces of the fair being held have been found.
