= Kibby Wind Power Project =

Wind farm in Maine, United States

Coordinates: 45°23′52″N 70°32′04″W

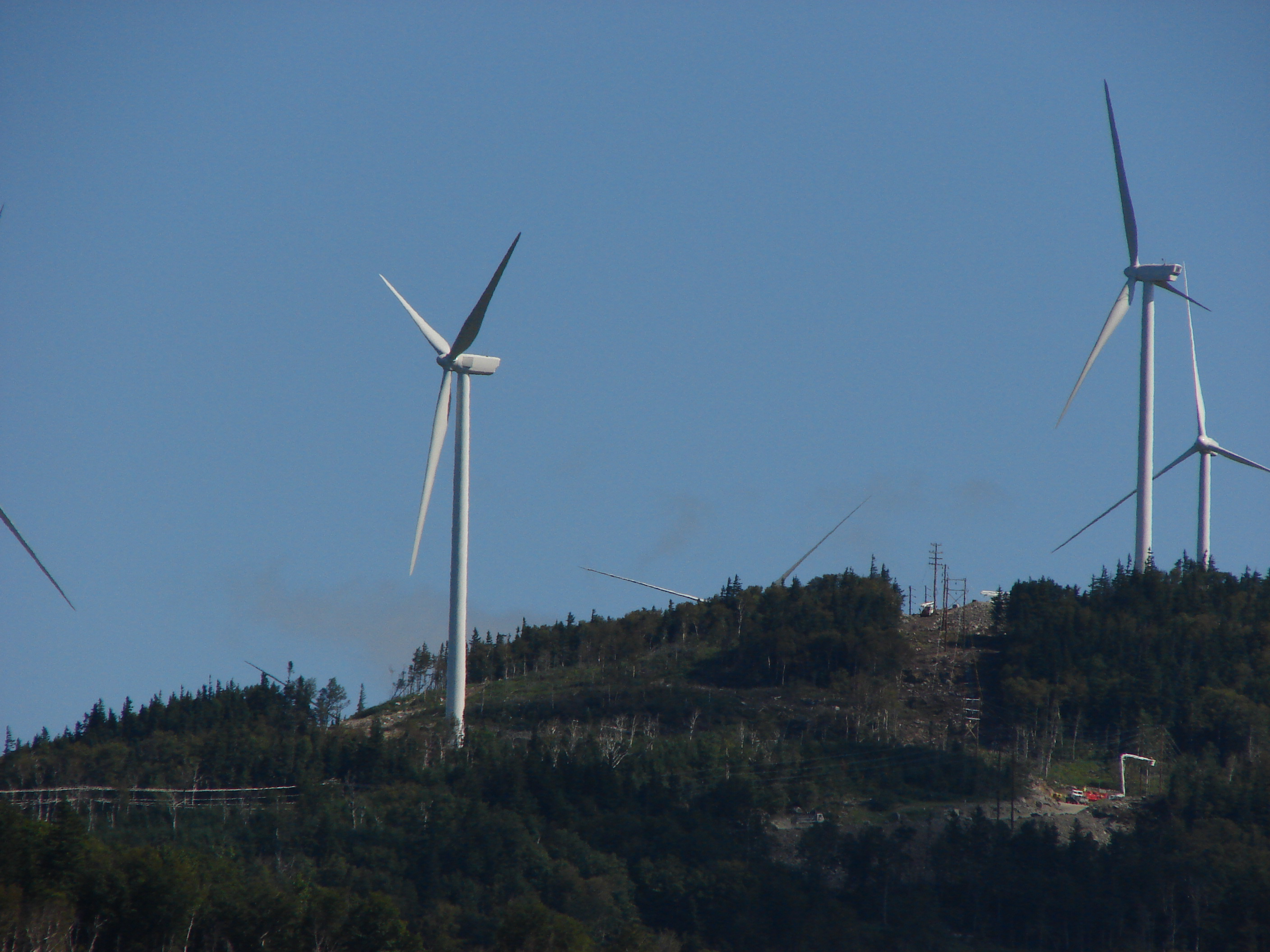
Turbines

Kibby Wind Power Project is a wind farm on Kibby Mountain in Franklin County, Maine, United States of America.

== History ==
In the mid 1990s, Kibby Mountain entered the public spotlight when a wind farm was proposed for the mountain and neighboring peaks. The project was subject to much public debate and was revised repeatedly. TransCanada Corporation's third proposal, in 2006, was for 44 3-megawatt (MW) wind turbines strung along the ridges of Kibby Mountain and nearby Kibby Range. While still opposed by the advocacy group Friends of the Boundary Mountains, other environmental groups including the Appalachian Mountain Club, Maine Audubon, and Natural Resources Council of Maine announced their support for the project in 2007. Among other conditions, TransCanada agreed not to develop wind facilities on approximately 1,324 acres (536 ha) of land above 2,700 feet (820 m) near the project area.

On January 15, 2008, Maine's Land Use Regulation Commission (LURC) unanimously approved TransCanada's preliminary development plan and rezoning request for 2,367 acres (958 ha). The commission rejected another, smaller wind power project on Black Nubble but concluded that the Kibby mountains have "relatively low use by the public, and these mountains have not been designated as having regionally scenic significance." The LURC gave final approval on July 10, 2008.

The wind farm — at a capacity of 132 MW, New England's largest — is expected to generate about 357 million kilowatt-hours (41 MW·yr) of electricity annually. Half the turbines were put online in October 2009, and the remainder in 2010. The capital cost of the project has grown to approximately US $350 million. An expansion, of perhaps 45 MW, is under consideration.

== See also ==
- List of mountains in Maine
- Wind power in Maine
