= Katahdin Falls =

Waterfall in Maine, United States

- Interactive map of Katahdin Falls
- Location: Piscataquis County, Maine, United States
- Coordinates: 45°54′33″N 68°56′52″W
- Type: Tiered
- Total height: 800 feet (244 m)

Katahdin Falls is the tallest waterfall in Maine, in the United States, dropping up to 800 vertical feet (244 m) with a main drop of 280 feet (85 m). It is located in Baxter State Park in Piscataquis County opposite of Witherlie Ravine, on Mount Katahdin on a tributary of Katahdin Stream.

== See also ==
- List of waterfalls
