= Wiltipoll =

Breed of sheep

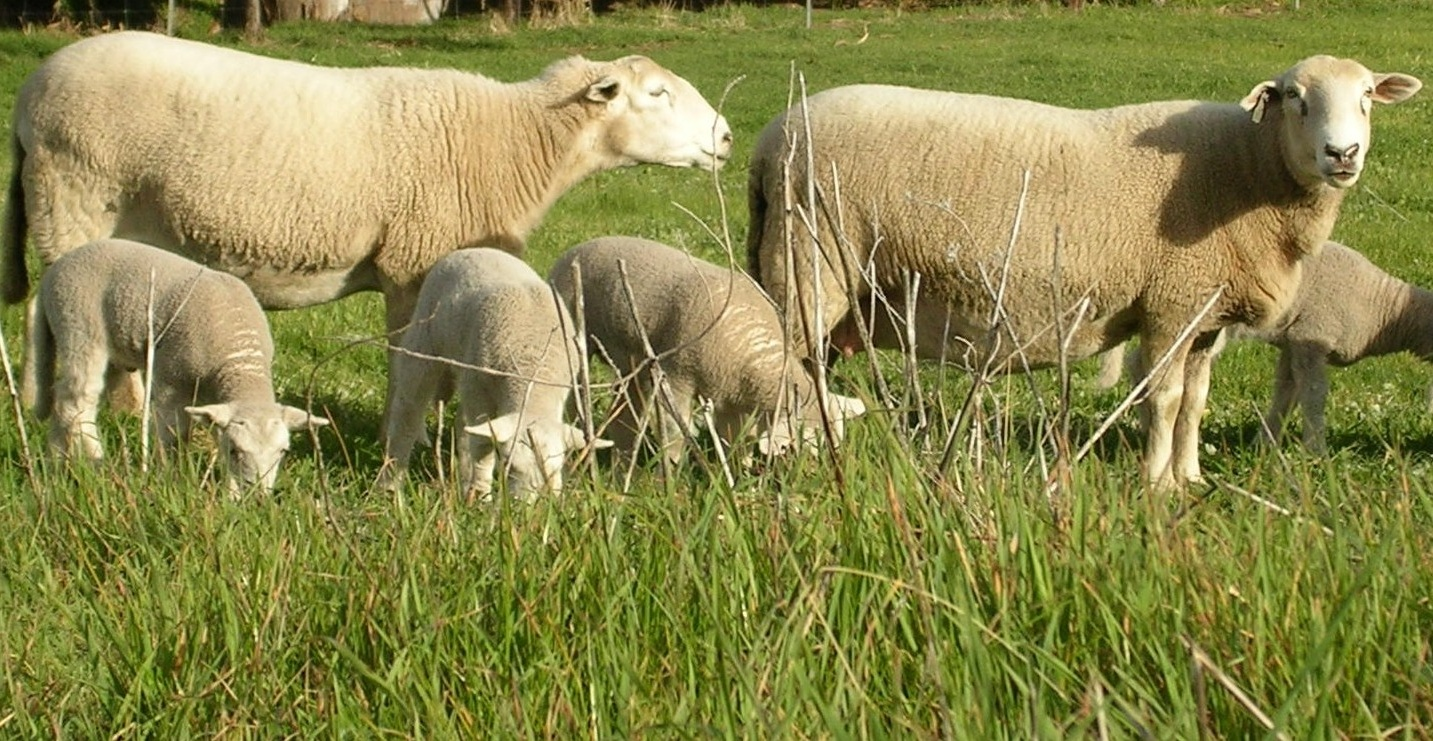
Wiltipoll ewes and lambs

The Wiltipoll is a breed of polled domestic sheep that was developed in Australia from Wiltshire Horn sheep with the infusion of Border Leicester, Perendale, Poll Dorset, and Poll Merino genetics, that are raised for meat.

== History ==
The polled variety of the Wiltshire Horn sheep was developed in Australia to create a polled variety of the easy-care Wiltshire Horn sheep suitable for heavy lamb production. In 1996, the breed association was formed, and it has expanded rapidly.

== Characteristics ==
Wiltipolls are large, easy-care, plain-bodied sheep that shed their wool annually. They do not require crutching or shearing and do not suffer readily from fly strike, which makes them a useful breed for small holdings without shearing sheds. These sheep must have at least 96.87% Wiltshire Horn genetics, completely shed their fleece annually, and be polled. The ewes are seasonal breeders, but are good mothers, have high fertility with a high percentage of multiple births.

Wiltipoll sheep may weigh up to 125 kg (276 lb) under reasonable conditions.

Wiltipoll sheep (polled Wiltshire Horn) shed their wool annually in spring to summer and produce lean, heavy lambs. They are a polled breed (no horns) bred for the production of prime lamb. The wool is simply shed and falls to the ground.

Due to this process, the energy of the sheep is directed into meat and milk, not wool.

The breed is, therefore, very low maintenance as it has no need for shearing, crutching, mulesing, jetting, dipping, and docking of tails. The Wiltipoll is grass seed-resistant and fly- and lice-resistant, reducing the need for chemicals or the painful practice of mulesing. All this equates to less expense and less work.

Wiltipolls have a high lambing percentage of 130–180% and good maternal instincts. They are renowned for twins and triplets. This requires fewer ewes to manage and feed with more prime lamb to sell. They produce prime lambs without laying down fat, thus producing a very lean, high-quality meat.

As the Wiltipoll are polled, the sheep are easier to handle and less bruising occurs.

Wiltipolls ideally suit small acreage holders and also those farmers who can not continue with the workload associated with wool breeds. This breed is very hardy and can survive on rough, scrubby feed.
