= Holeb =

- Township
- Location in Maine Holeb (the United States)
- Coordinates: 45°34′38″N 70°27′23″W
- Country: United States
- State: Maine
- County: Somerset County, Maine

Area
  - Total: 39.5 sq mi (102.3 km^{2})
- Elevation: 1,253 ft (382 m)

Population (2006)
  - Total: 2,074
  - Density: 52/sq mi (20/km^{2})
- Time zone: UTC-5 (ET)
- Postal code: 04945

Holeb is an unorganized township in western Maine, United States.

Holeb's history mainly consists of logging and recreational fishing. The Moose River runs a significant length through Holeb's township borders.

The Birch Island House is located within Holeb.
