= Arctic Katahdin butterfly =

Scientific classification
- Domain: Eukaryota
- Kingdom: Animalia
- Phylum: Arthropoda
- Class: Insecta
- Order: Lepidoptera
- Family: Nymphalidae
- Genus: Oeneis
- Species: O. polixenes
- Subspecies: O. p. katahdin

Trinomial name
- Oeneis polixenes katahdin (Newcomb, 1901)

Subspecies of butterfly

The arctic Katahdin butterfly (Oeneis polixenes katahdin) is a subspecies of the polixenes arctic (Oeneis polixenes). This particular butterfly is considered endangered because it only appears on Mount Katahdin in the State of Maine, and its small population fluctuates every year.

== Description ==
The arctic Katahdin butterfly is a yellowish-brown color with semi translucent wings. An adult can measure about 2-4 inches.

== Habitat ==
The arctic Katahdin butterfly, like other arctic butterflies, prefers tundra conditions However, this particular type of butterfly resides in only one area of the world, the summit of Mount Katahdin in Maine’s Baxter State Park.

== Life span ==
These butterflies usually have a 2 year life cycle.

== Threats ==
The arctic Katahdin butterfly is listed in Maine as an endangered species. The main threat to these butterflies are humans. It is currently illegal to collect the arctic Katahdin butterfly.
