= Wiltshire Horn =

British breed of sheep

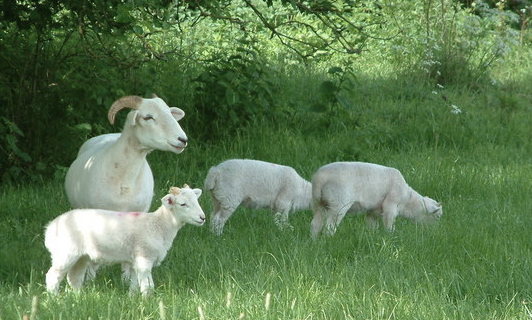
- An ewe with triplets
- Country of origin: United Kingdom

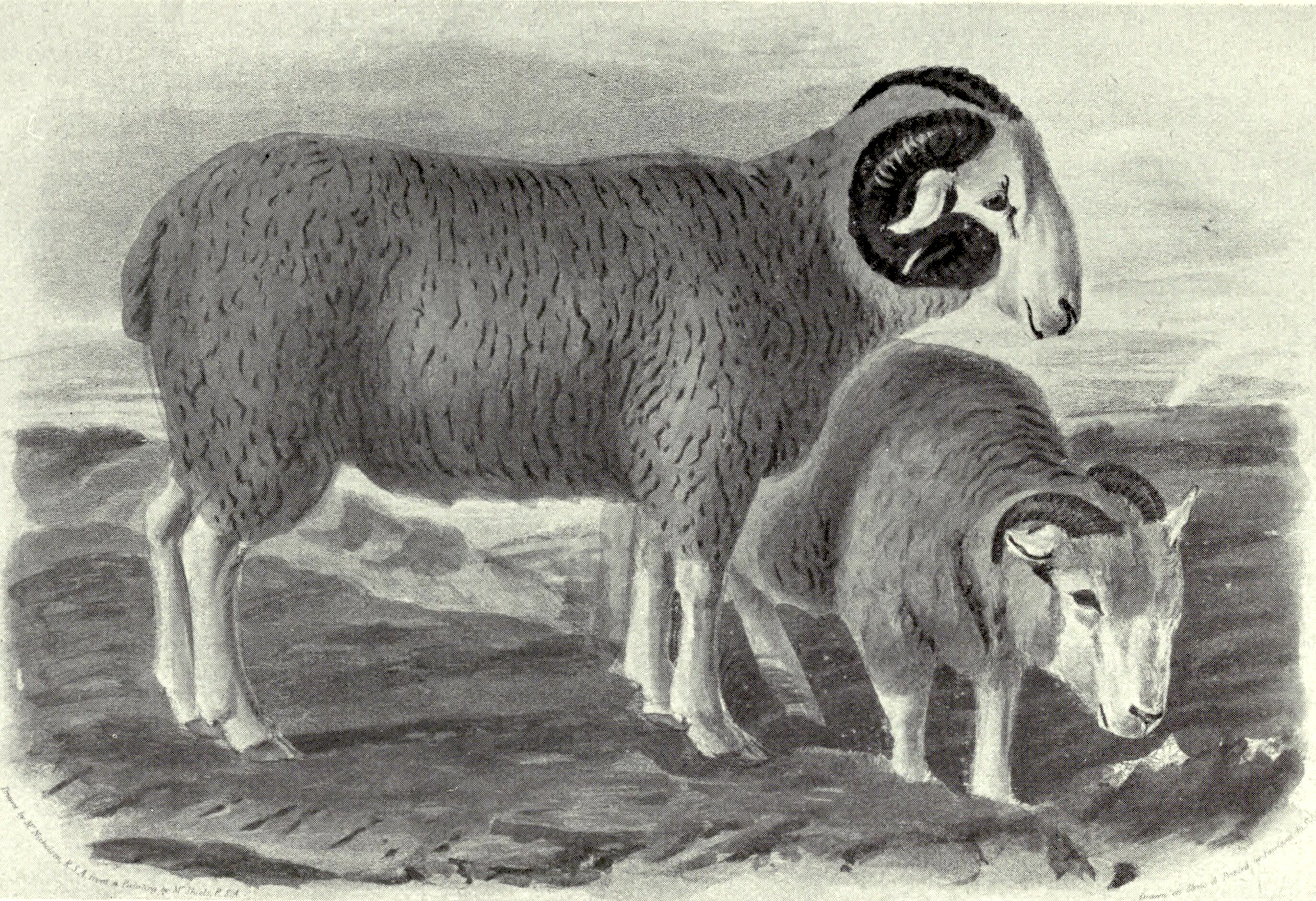
Image from 1915

The Wiltshire Horn is a British breed of domestic sheep. It originates Wiltshire in southern England and is raised principally for meat. The breed is unusual among native British breeds, for it has the unusual feature of moulting its short wool and hair coat naturally in spring, obviating the need for shearing. They are good mothers and have high fertility.

== History ==
The Wiltshire Horn was until the eighteenth century one of the predominant sheep breeds of southern England. For hundreds of years, it served a clear function on the thin chalk soils of the Wiltshire Downs, requiring little shelter from the elements and providing dung and urine to fertilise the wheat-growing land. At the same time, it provided an easily managed source of quality meat, but the rising price of wool and a general move away from horned sheep saw the breed suffer a dramatic decline throughout the nineteenth century.

It was nearly extinct at the start of the twentieth century. In 1923, in an attempt to save the breed, the Wiltshire Horn Breed Society was formed. By the early 1980s, there were 45 registered flocks in the UK, but the 2009 edition of the flock book of the Wiltshire Horn Sheep Society recognises almost 300 flocks.

The Wiltshire Horn is one of the foundation breeds for Katahdin, Wiltipoll, and Easycare breeds and the Hampshire breed along with Southdown sheep and the Berkshire Nott.

Until the twentieth century, the breed was chiefly traded at local events such as the Westbury Hill Fair.

== Characteristics ==
Males and females both have horns. Ram horns grow one full spiral each year until maturity. Both sexes are white with occasion black spots on the undercoat. This is a hair breed, growing a thick, coarse coat in the winter and shedding in the summer. Rams weigh about 250 lb (110 kg) and ewes 150 lb (68 kg).
