= Katahdin sheep =

American breed of sheep

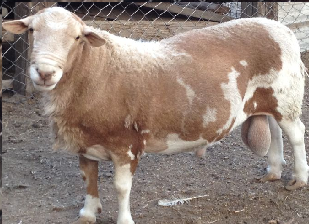
- A ram
- Conservation status: FAO (2007): not at risk; DAD-IS (2024): not at risk; Livestock Conservancy: not at risk
- Country of origin: United States
- Distribution: 44 American states; Canada; Caribbean; Central America; South America
- Use: meat

Traits
- Hair color: variable
- Horn status: usually polled (hornless)

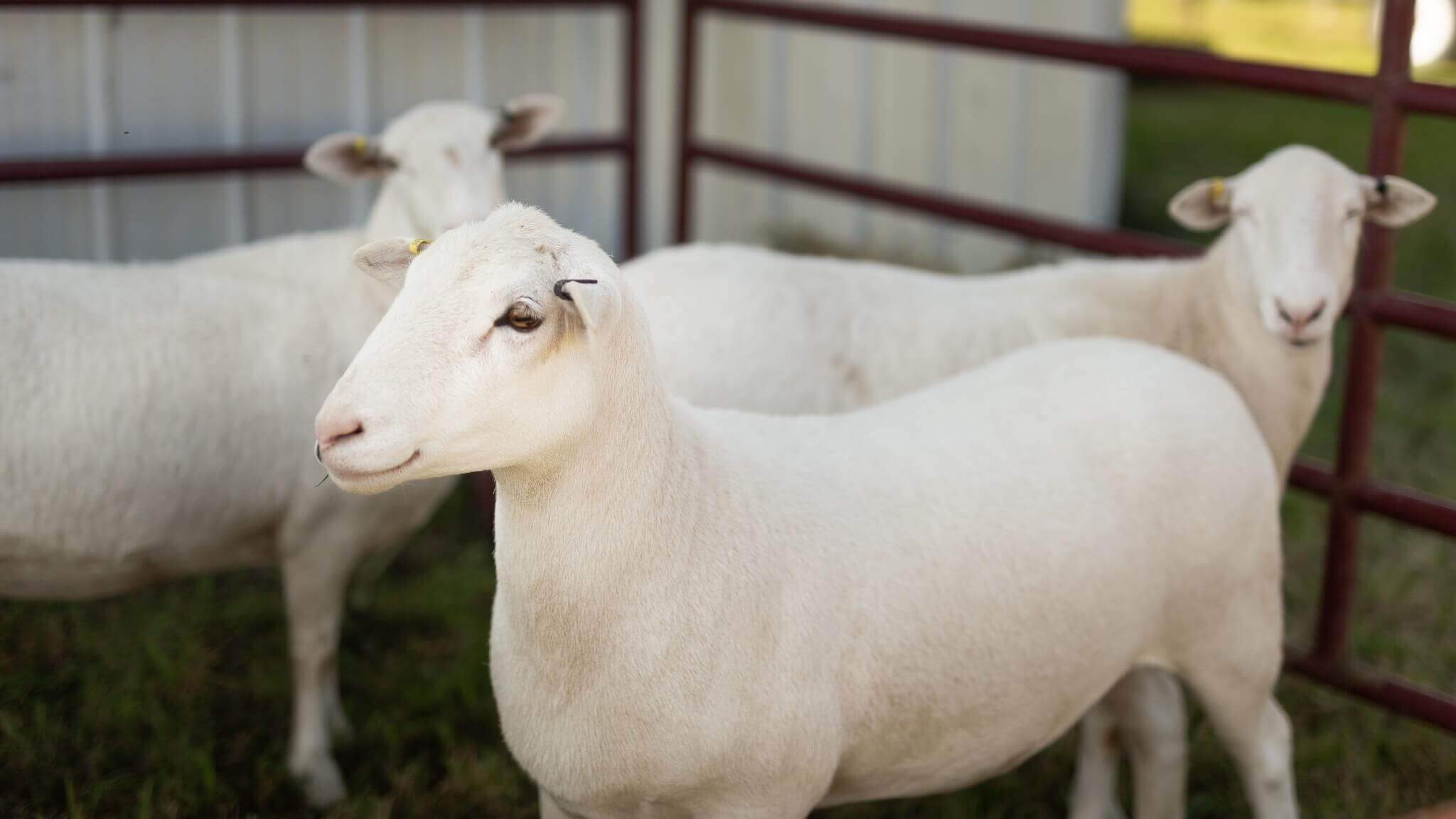
Ewes

The Katahdin is a modern American breed of sheep. It is an easy-care sheep: it grows a hair coat with little wool which moults naturally in the spring, and so does not need to be shorn. It is reared for meat only.

It was developed by a breeder named Michael Piel in Maine, and is named for Mount Katahdin in that state. From about 1957 he cross-bred a small number of African Hair Sheep from the Virgin Islands with various meat breeds, principally the Suffolk.

== History ==
In 1957 a farmer named Michael Piel imported three African Hair Sheep (Note: These were later known as Virgin Islands White and as St. Croix.) – a ram and two ewes – from the island of Saint Croix in the Virgin Islands to his farm in Abbot, Maine. For almost twenty years he experimentally cross-bred them with sheep of a wide variety of breeds, among them the American Tunis, the Cheviot, the Hampshire Down, the Southdown, the Suffolk and other English Down breeds. All but the Suffolk crosses were eventually discarded, and a flock of about 120 breeding ewes was selected. In the 1970s he experimented with cross-breeding with the Wiltshire Horn, the only naturally-moulting English sheep; after his death in 1976, his widow took steps to breed out unwanted characteristics of this cross including the horns, the lower prolificacy and the reduced ease of handling.

A breed society, Katahdin Hair Sheep International, was formed in 1985, and a flock-book was started.

The Katahdin was formerly an endangered breed, included on the watchlist of the Livestock Conservancy; it was removed ("graduated") in 2013. In 2024 its conservation status was listed in DAD-IS as "not at risk"; the world-wide population was estimated at 13957, of which approximately 85% was in the United States. The sheep were also present in Canada and in sixteen other countries, principally in the Caribbean, in Central America and in South America.

== Characteristics ==
The Katahdin is of medium size: the average weight for ewes is approximately 65 kg (145 lb) and for rams about 95 kg (210 lb). The sheep may be of any colour, and are usually naturally polled (hornless).

The Katahdin has the typical characteristics common to hair sheep: it has an outer coat of fine hair, and in winter may grow a wool undercoat which moults naturally in the spring, so that it does not need to be shorn; it is tolerant of hot and humid climatic conditions, and has good resistance to parasites including some gastrointestinal nematodes resistant to anthelmintic drugs; ewes are to some extent aseasonal and capable of breeding in the spring.

== Use ==
The Katahdin is reared for meat. The lambing rate is some 168%.
