= South Branch Moose River (Maine) =

Location
- Country: United States

Physical characteristics
- Source
  - location: Maine
  - elevation: 2,700 feet (820 m)
- Mouth
  - location: Moose River
  - coordinates: 45°31′33″N 70°35′23″W
  - elevation: 1,400 feet (430 m)
- Length: 11 mi (18 km)

Basin features
- Progression: Moose River – Moosehead Lake – Kennebec River
- Tributaries
  - left: West Branch Moose River
  - right: East Branch Moose River

The South Branch Moose River is a tributary of the Moose River in Franklin County, Maine. Its source (45°26′21″N 70°36′14″W) on Caribou Mountain is about 1.5 miles (2 km) from the Canada–United States border, in Skinner (Maine Township 1, Range 7, WBKP). From there, the river winds generally north for 11.0 miles (17.7 km) to its confluence with the main stream of the Moose River in Lowelltown (T1, R8, WBKP).

== See also ==
- List of rivers of Maine
