= Sugar Island (Maine) =

Island in Moosehead Lake, Maine, U.S.

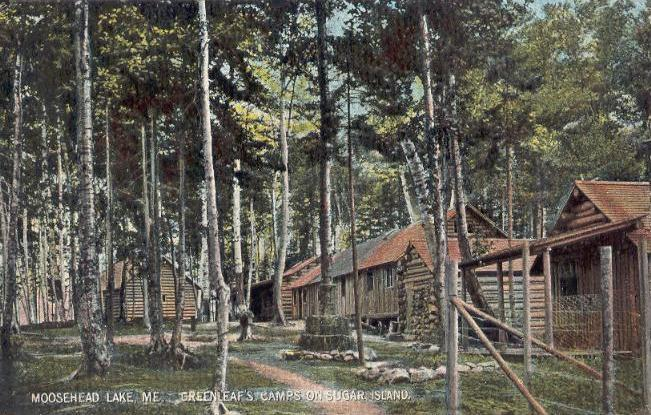
- Sugar Island camps in 1910

- Location within Maine Location within the United States

Geography
- Location: Moosehead Lake
- Coordinates: 45°35′N 69°35′W
- Area: 4,208 acres (1,703 ha)
- Length: 4 mi (6 km)
- Width: 2 mi (3 km)

Administration
- United States
- State: Maine
- County: Piscataquis
- Area: Northwest Piscataquis

Demographics
- Population: 0 (2000)

Sugar Island is a 4,208 acres (1,703 ha) island located in Maine's Moosehead Lake. It is roughly four miles (6.4 km) long and two miles (3.2 km) wide at its widest and longest points. Sugar Island is Moosehead Lake's largest island. They are located in the unorganized territory of Northwest Piscataquis.

Sugar Island is mainly accessed through Lily Bay State Park, and is reached in approximately five minutes from the state park by boat. There is a fee at the state park of three dollars.

There are two resident camps on Sugar Island on the south side, which have been frequented by three generations of family members and friends year after year. In April 2000, at the time of the 22nd federal census, no family members were present, so the population is currently recorded as zero.
