= Easycare =

Breed of sheep

- Conservation status: FAO (2007): not listed; DAD-IS (2022): unknown
- Other names: Easy Care
- Country of origin: United Kingdom
- Use: meat

Traits
- Weight: Female: average 60 or 65 kg
- Wool colour: White
- Face colour: White
- Horn status: Polled

The Easycare or Easy Care is a modern British breed of easy-care sheep. It was developed in Wales in the second half of the twentieth century by cross-breeding between Welsh Mountain and Wiltshire Horn stock, with the aim of combining the meat-producing qualities and natural moulting characteristic of the latter with the hardiness of the former. It is reared for meat production.

== History ==
In the latter twentieth century the price of wool in the United Kingdom fell so low that its value did not always cover the cost of shearing the sheep that provided it. The Easycare was bred from the mid-1960s by Iolo Owen on the island of Anglesey in North Wales. He cross-bred Welsh Mountain and Wiltshire Horn stock, with the aim of developing a sheep that would combine the hardiness of the Welsh Mountain with the meat-producing qualities of the Wiltshire Horn, and would also be polled and moult naturally without needing to be shorn. By the end of the century the number of breeding ewes was over 10,000; in 2012 the total population was reported to be 150,000.

There is a breed society, but no flock-book; stock is not registered.
