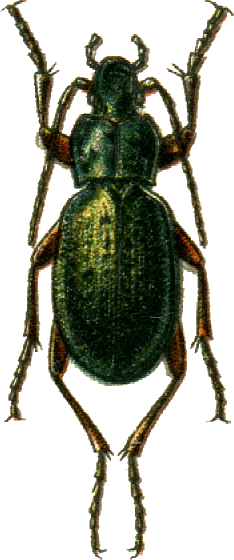

Scientific classification
- Domain: Eukaryota
- Kingdom: Animalia
- Phylum: Arthropoda
- Class: Insecta
- Order: Coleoptera
- Suborder: Adephaga
- Family: Carabidae
- Genus: Carabus
- Species: C. truncaticollis

Binomial name
- Carabus truncaticollis Eschscholtz, 1833

Synonyms
- Carabus polaris Poppius, 1907; Carabus sahlbergianus Géhin, 1885; Carabus tristis Motschulsky, 1850; Carabus lenaensis Mandl, 1955; Carabus rufocupreus Breuning in Beheim & Breuning, 1943; Carabus alaskensis Basilewsky, 1937; Carabus lutshnikianus Basilewsky, 1937

= Carabus truncaticollis =

Species of beetle

Carabus truncaticollis, the blunt-collared worm and slug hunter, is a species of beetle from the family Carabidae found in Russia and the eastern Palearctic realm. In eastern Asia, the species ranges from Siberia south to Mongolia; it is also found in North America in NW Canada, and Alaska. The species is found in mesic tundra environments, such as moist meadows.

== Subspecies ==
- Carabus truncaticollis truncaticollis (USA, Canada, Russia, Mongolia, Alaska)
- Carabus truncaticollis degeneratus J.R.Sahlberg, 1885 (Russia)
- Carabus truncaticollis dorogostaiskianus Deuve & Imura, 1992 (Russia)
- Carabus truncaticollis fleischeri Reitter, 1898 (Russia, Mongolia)
- Carabus truncaticollis kodaricola Deuve in Deuve & Mourzine, 1998 (Russia)
- Carabus truncaticollis tungusensis Obydov, 2010 (Russia)
- Carabus truncaticollis uczugeicus Obydov, 2009 (Russia)
