= Katahdin =

Highest mountain in Maine, US

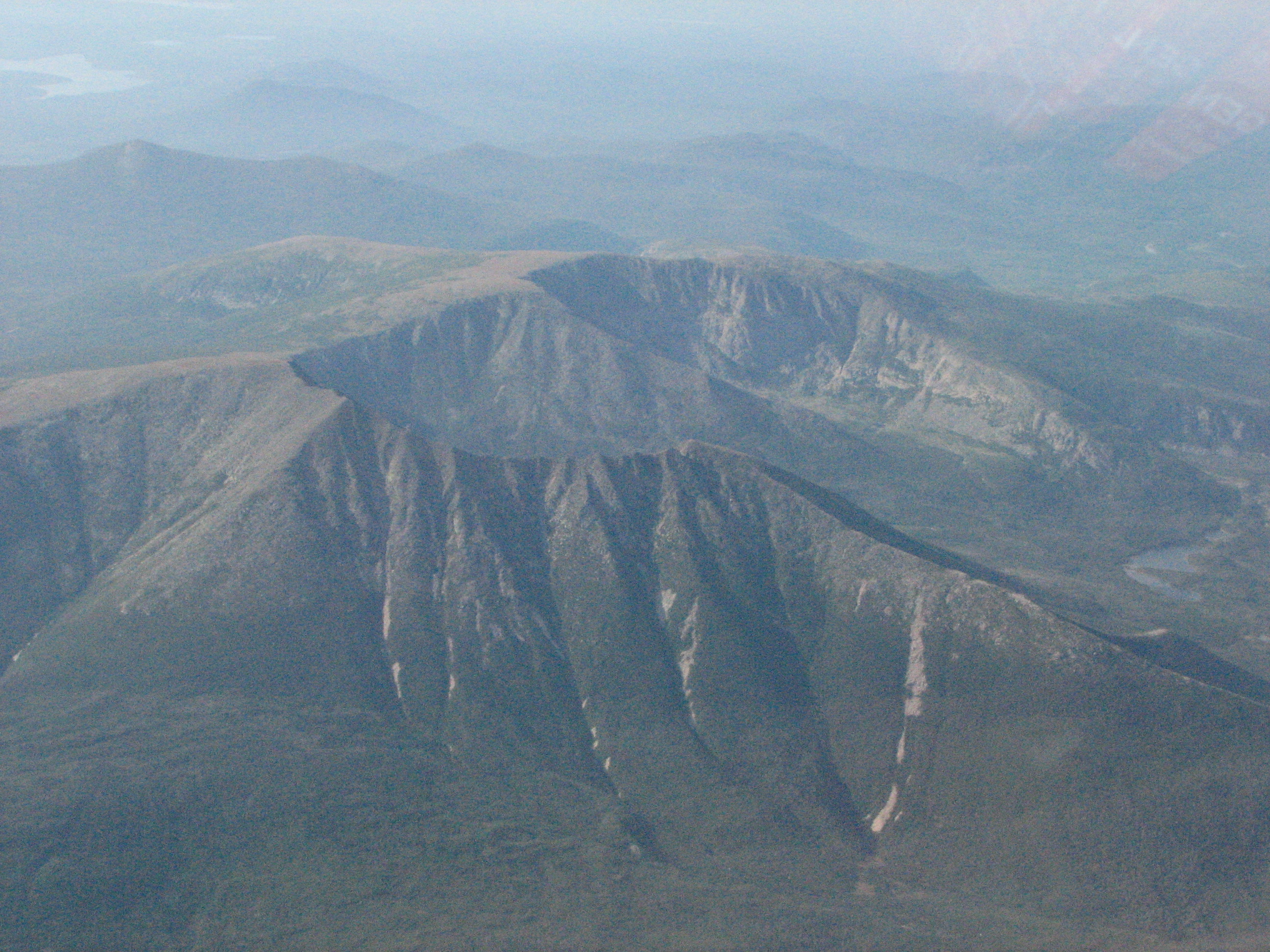
- Katahdin from 10,000 ft (3,000 m)

Highest point
- Elevation: 5,267 ft (1,605 m) NAVD 88
- Prominence: 4,288 ft (1,307 m)
- Listing: North America isolated peaks 78th; U.S. state high point 22nd; New England Fifty Finest 2nd; New England 4000-footers
- Coordinates: 45°54′16″N 68°55′17″W

Geography
- Location within Maine Location within the United States
- Location: Northeast Piscataquis, Piscataquis County, Maine, U.S.
- Parent range: Appalachian Mountains
- Topo map: USGS Mount Katahdin

Geology
- Rock age(s): Devonian, Acadian orogeny
- Mountain type: Granite

Climbing
- Easiest route: Hike, Abol Trail / Hunt Trail; 3.8 miles (6.1 km)

U.S. National Natural Landmark
- Designated: 1967

Mount Katahdin (/kəˈtɑːdɪn/ kə-TAH-din) is the highest mountain in the U.S. state of Maine at 5,269 feet (1,606 m). Named Katahdin, which means 'Great Mountain', by the Penobscot Native Americans, it is within Northeast Piscataquis, Piscataquis County, and is the centerpiece of Baxter State Park. It is a steep, tall massif formed from a granite intrusion weathered to the surface. The flora and fauna on the mountain are typical of those found in northern New England, with the summit hosting fragile and endangered alpine tundra.

Katahdin has been known to the Native Americans in the region for thousands of years and was known to Europeans since at least 1689. It has inspired hikes, climbs, journal narratives, paintings, and a piano sonata. The area around the peak was protected starting in the 1930s by Maine Governor Percival Baxter, who spent much of his personal fortune purchasing the mountain and surrounding lands after being unable to convince the state legislature of the spending state funds to purchase the mountain. Katahdin is the northern terminus of the Appalachian Trail and is near a stretch known as the Hundred-Mile Wilderness. Though part of the Appalachian Mountain system, Katahdin is isolated from the range, and sits largely on its own as a monadnock. The nearest higher mountains in any direction are the high peaks of the Presidential Range, around 170 miles (270 km) to the south-west.

In 1967, Mount Katahdin was designated as a National Natural Landmark by the National Park Service.

The mountain is commonly called just "Katahdin", though the official name is "Mount Katahdin" as decided by the US Board on Geographic Names in 1893.

== Geology ==
Katahdin is part of a laccolith that formed in the Acadian orogeny when an island arc collided with eastern North America approximately 400 million years ago. On the sides of Katahdin are four glacial cirques carved into the granite by alpine glaciers and in these cirques behind moraines and eskers are several ponds.

In Baxter State Park, many outcrops of sedimentary rocks have striations, whereas the Granite of Katahdin and the Rhyolite of Traveler Mountain have weathered surfaces on which striations are commonly not preserved. Bedrock surfaces of igneous rocks which were buried by glacial sediments and only recently exposed have well preserved striations, as in the vicinity of Ripogenus Dam. Several outcrops of sedimentary rocks along the Patten Road show striations, especially on the north side of the road at Hurricane Deck. A few outcrops near the Patten Road just north of Horse Mountain are striated, as are several outcrops of sedimentary rocks along the road from Trout Brook Farm northward to Second Lake Matagamon.

== Fauna ==
Fauna include black bear, deer, and moose as well as black flies and mosquitos in the spring. A subspecies of Arctic butterfly, known as the Katahdin Arctic (Oeneis polixenes katahdin) is specific to the area, and is currently listed as endangered. Among the birds are Bicknell's thrush and various songbirds and raptors. A study of the animal communities was published by Irving H. Blake in 1926. The flora includes pine, spruce, fir, hemlock, beech, maple, birch, aspen, and pincushion plant (Diapensia lapponica).

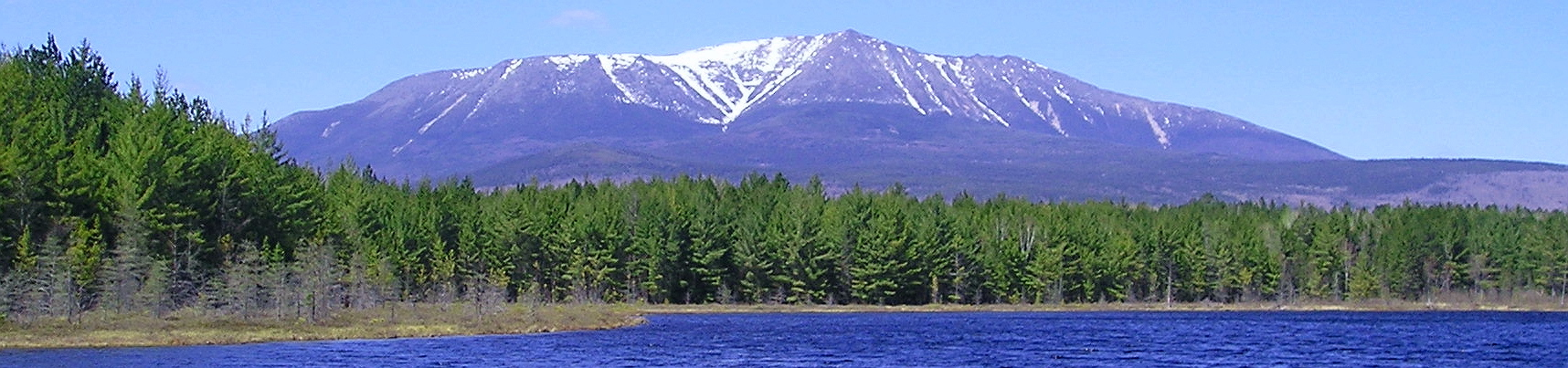
Mount Katahdin

== Geography ==
Katahdin is in Baxter State Park, which is in east central Piscataquis County, about 25 mi (40 km) northwest of Millinocket. It is on the drainage divide between the East and West branches of the Penobscot River.

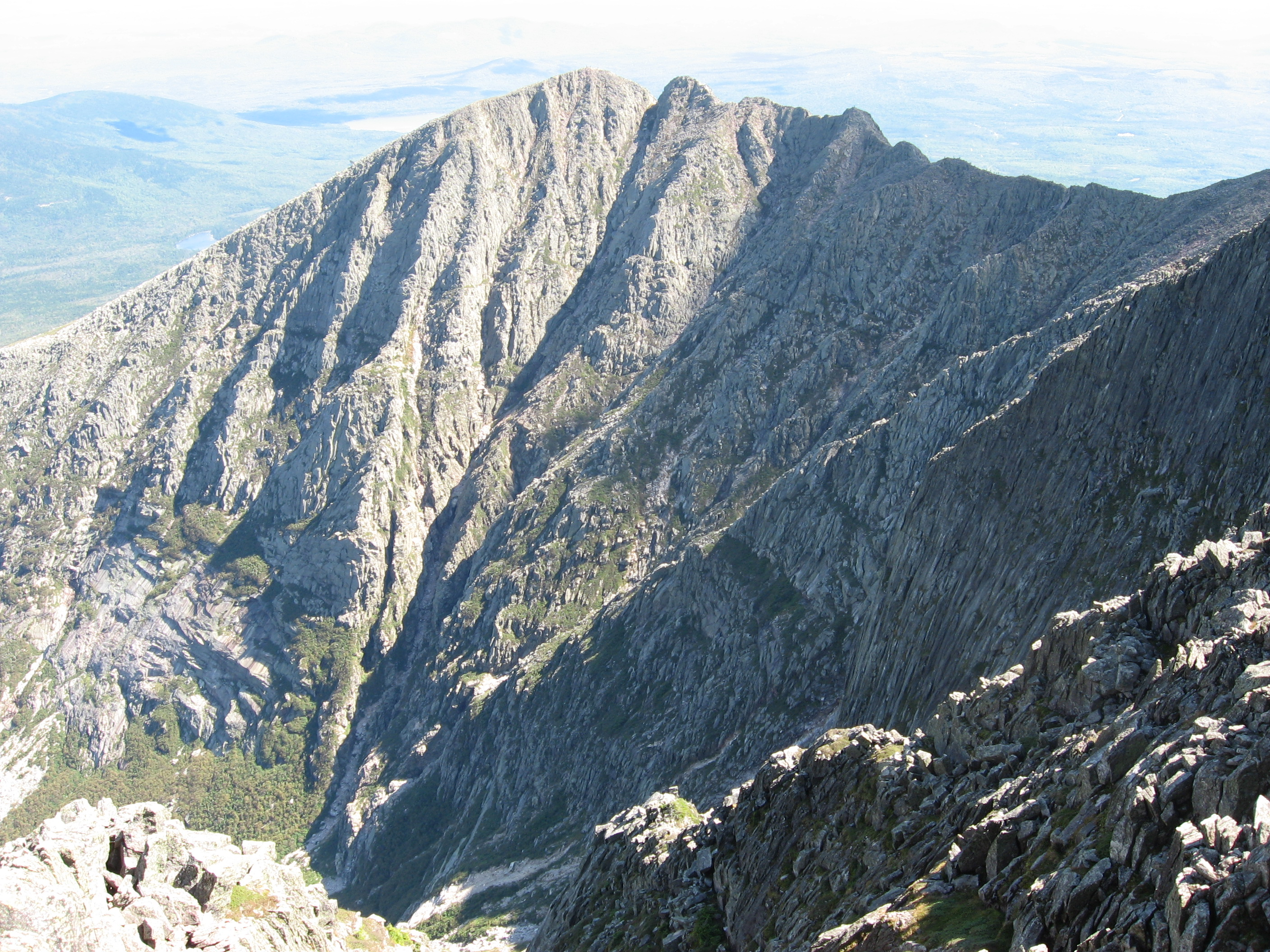
A view of the Knife Edge from summit of Katahdin

The mountain massif itself consists of multiple peaks. Baxter Peak is the tallest, and is the official northern terminus of the Appalachian Trail. South Peak and Pamola Peak are southeast and east of Baxter Peak, respectively, along the Knife Edge ridgeline, while Hamlin Peak lies to the north.

There is low lake country to the south and west of Katahdin, and lowlands extending east to the Atlantic and north to the Saint Lawrence River in Canada.

The summit of Katahdin offers some of the longest unbroken lines of sight in the United States, and on clear days can be seen all the way from the White Mountains of neighboring New Hampshire; a distance of 170 miles (270 km).

Katahdin's height and isolation earns it significant coverage in indigenous and post-colonial Maine culture and literature. Katahdin's profile is distinctive and the indisputable centerpiece of Baxter State Park. Katahdin and nearby Hamlin Peak are the only two areas to host a subarctic climate in Maine. In winter, the snowcapped east and west faces of Katahdin resemble "the Kilimanjaro of New England", and it dominates the otherwise flat and endless forests of the North Maine Woods. Katahdin is also the northernmost mountain in the eastern United States with an elevation over 4,000 feet (1,200 m).

== Climate ==
Climate data for Mount Katahdin 45.9023 N, 68.9146 W, Elevation: 4,685 ft (1,428 m) (1991–2020 normals)
Month	Jan	Feb	Mar	Apr	May	Jun	Jul	Aug	Sep	Oct	Nov	Dec	Year
Mean daily maximum °F (°C)	16.9 (−8.4)	17.9 (−7.8)	24.1 (−4.4)	38.2 (3.4)	51.4 (10.8)	60.5 (15.8)	65.5 (18.6)	64.8 (18.2)	58.4 (14.7)	45.2 (7.3)	31.0 (−0.6)	22.6 (−5.2)	41.4 (5.2)
Daily mean °F (°C)	9.0 (−12.8)	9.8 (−12.3)	16.8 (−8.4)	30.1 (−1.1)	44.0 (6.7)	53.7 (12.1)	59.0 (15.0)	57.8 (14.3)	51.0 (10.6)	37.9 (3.3)	24.8 (−4.0)	15.3 (−9.3)	34.1 (1.2)
Mean daily minimum °F (°C)	1.1 (−17.2)	1.8 (−16.8)	9.4 (−12.6)	22.1 (−5.5)	36.6 (2.6)	47.0 (8.3)	52.5 (11.4)	50.8 (10.4)	43.6 (6.4)	30.6 (−0.8)	18.5 (−7.5)	8.0 (−13.3)	26.8 (−2.9)
Average precipitation inches (mm)	5.98 (152)	4.82 (122)	5.98 (152)	6.72 (171)	6.71 (170)	7.32 (186)	6.96 (177)	6.48 (165)	6.40 (163)	8.81 (224)	7.32 (186)	7.71 (196)	81.21 (2,064)
Source: PRISM Climate Group

== Human history ==
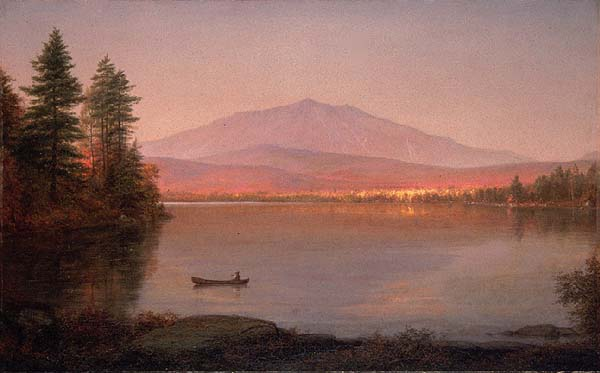
Mount Katahdin from Millinocket Camp, by Frederic Edwin Church, 1895

Katahdin is referred to 60 years after Field's climb of Agiokochuk (Mount Washington) in the writings of John Gyles, a teenage colonist who was captured near Portland, Maine, in 1689 by the Abenaki. While in the company of Abenaki hunting parties, he traveled up and down several Maine rivers including both branches of the Penobscot, passing close to "Teddon". He remarked that it was higher than the White Hills above the Saco River.

Among some Native Americans, Katahdin was believed to be the home of the storm god Pamola, and thus an area to be avoided.

The first recorded climb of "Catahrdin" was by Massachusetts surveyors Zackery Adley and Charles Turner, Jr. in August 1804. The letter describing the ascent of Charles Turner Jr. states that they began at the (West Branch Penobscot) at 8:00 a.m. and arrived on the summit at 5:00 p.m. guided by two Native Americans who were initially cautious but when the "cold part of the mountain" was reached and sensing the determination of the others became ambitious to reach the top first. Turner lists his party as: William Howe, Amos Patten, Joseph Treat, Samuel Call, William Rice, Richard Winslow, Charles Turner, Jr. In the 1930s Governor Percival Baxter began to acquire land and finally deeded more than 200,000 acres (810 km^{2}) to the State of Maine for a park, named Baxter State Park after him. The summit was officially recognized by the US Board on Geographic Names as "Baxter Peak" in 1931.

In the 1840s Henry David Thoreau climbed Katahdin, which he spelled "Ktaadn"; his ascent is recorded in a well-known chapter of The Maine Woods. A few years later Theodore Winthrop wrote about his visit in Life in the Open Air. Painters Frederic Edwin Church and Marsden Hartley are well-known artists who created landscapes of Katahdin. On 30 November 2011, Christie's auctioned Church's 1860 painting Twilight (Katahdin) for $3.1 million.

Elizabeth Oakes Smith "climbed Mount Katahdin in 1849—reportedly the first white woman to do so".

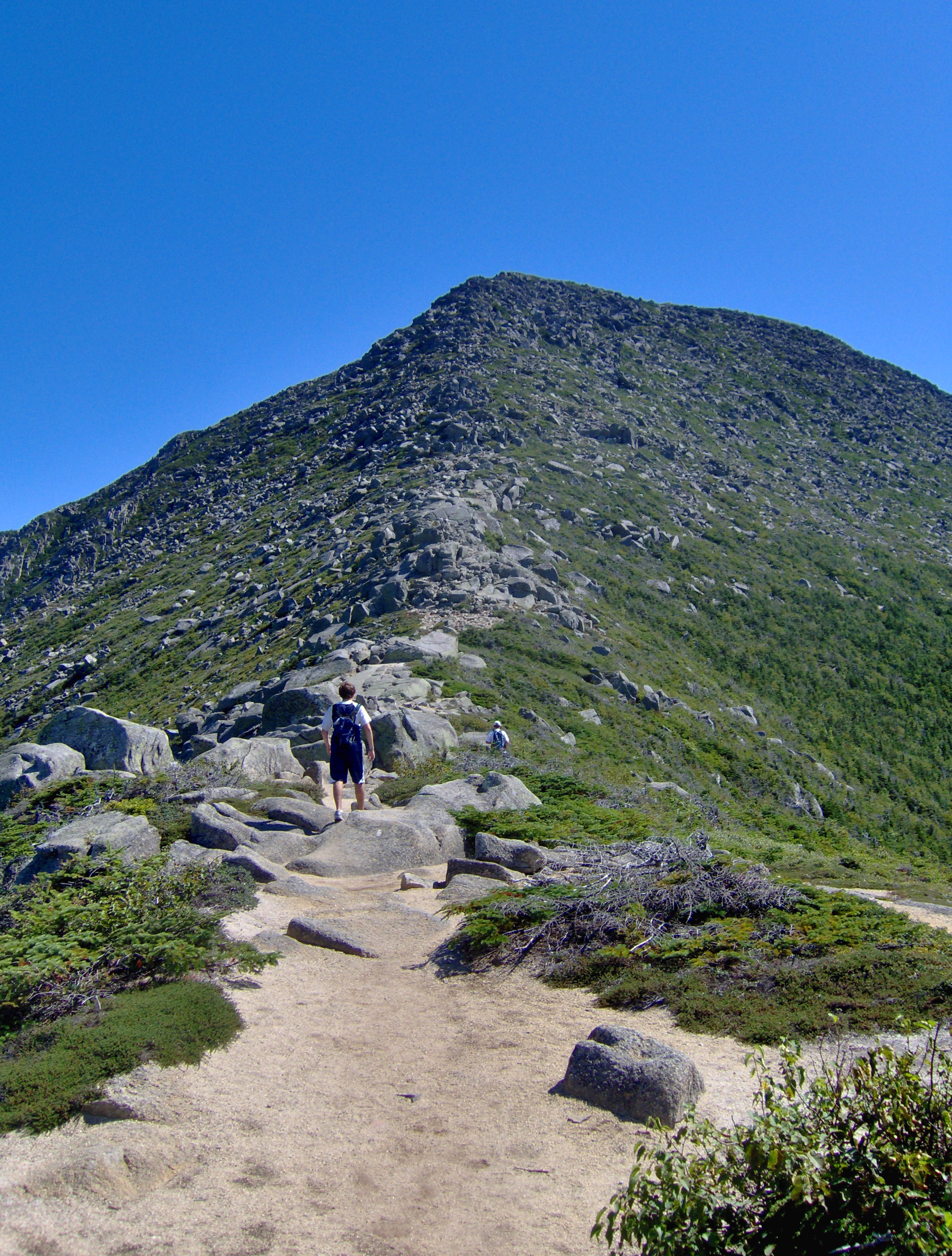
The Appalachian Trail on Katahdin's Hunt Spur

== Recreation opportunities ==
As the northern terminus of the Appalachian Trail and southern terminus of the International Appalachian Trail, Katahdin is a popular hiking and backpacking destination and the centerpiece of Baxter State Park. Baxter State Park is open year-round, though strictly regulated in winter. The overnight camping season is, weather permitting, from May 15 to October 15 each year, with some campgrounds staying open until October 22. Capacity limits have been placed on day-use parking at the trailheads to minimize the overuse of trails.

Katahdin has several trails leading up to Baxter, Pamola, or Hamlin Peaks. These trails average eight to twelve hours round-trip depending on ability. Katahdin is often considered one of the most challenging hikes in the entire Appalachian Mountain range.

List of Katahdin trailheads and trails

- Katahdin Stream Trailhead
  - Hunt (Appalachian Trail)
- Abol Trailhead
  - Abol
- Roaring Brook Trailhead
  - Helon Taylor (Leads to Knife Edge)
  - Dudley (Leads to Knife Edge)
  - Knife Edge
  - Chimney Pond
  - Cathedral
  - Saddle
  - Hamlin Ridge

Katahdin has three primary trailheads. Katahdin Stream, Abol, and Roaring Brook. Katahdin Stream is the trailhead for the Hunt trail, the final northbound leg of the Appalachian Trail. Abol is the trailhead for the Abol trail. Roaring Brook is the trailhead for the Helon Taylor trail, and the Chimney Pond trail which later branches into the Saddle, Cathedral, Dudley, and Hamlin Ridge trails.

All trails are maintained by the Baxter State Park Authority, which runs the Park. Any hike that starts at a trailhead and summits the mountain is considered very strenuous, the highest classification the Park Authority gives. Some individual trails are given lower classifications, as they are only part of a full summit hike. These trails include Saddle (strenuous), Hamlin Ridge trail (moderate), and Chimney Pond (moderate).

The most famous hike to the summit goes along Knife Edge, a glacial arête which traverses the ridge between Pamola Peak and Baxter Peak. There have been more than 60 deaths on Katahdin since 1933 including October 8 and 9, 2020. The park as a whole typically sees a need for roughly 40 search-and-rescue events per year (1 in 2,000 hikers), with a peak of 70 in 2013. The vast majority of incidents occur in the summer months, and the primary causes are leg injury, exhaustion, dehydration and disorientation. Because of this, Katahdin and New Hampshire's Mount Washington are routinely near the top of the most deadly "low mountains" on Earth, with more fatalities per foot of elevation gained than some much higher mountains in the Himalayas.

== Namesakes ==
- Two US Navy ships have been named USS Katahdin. Katahdin is also the name of a 1914 steamboat (later converted to diesel) owned by the Moosehead Marine Museum that plies the waters of Moosehead Lake in northern Maine.
- The Katahdin potato, which was certified by the U.S. Department of Agriculture in 1932, and is still popular in the Northeastern United States.
- The Katahdin sheep.
- Composer Alan Hovhaness composed a sonata for piano titled Mount Katahdin in 1987.
- Katahdin is a monster in the 1979 horror film Prophecy.
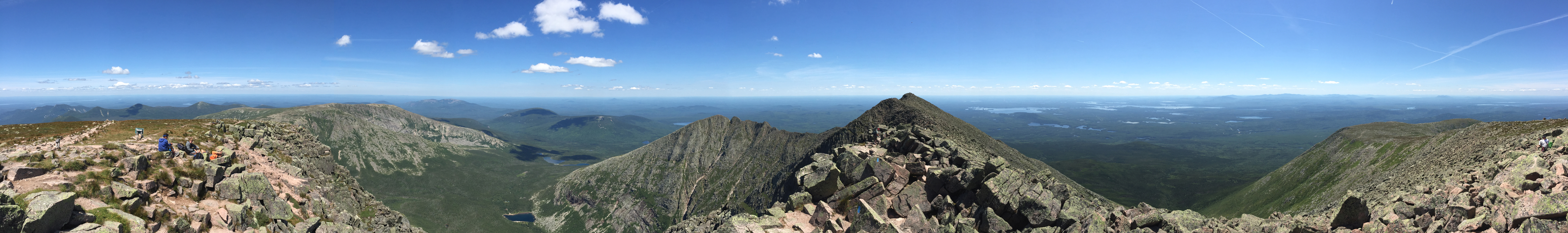
360-degree panorama from the summit of Baxter Peak on Mount Katahdin

== See also ==
- Donn Fendler – author of book about being lost on Katahdin in 1939.
- Katahdin Woods and Waters National Monument
- List of mountains of Maine
