= St. Croix sheep =

Breed of sheep

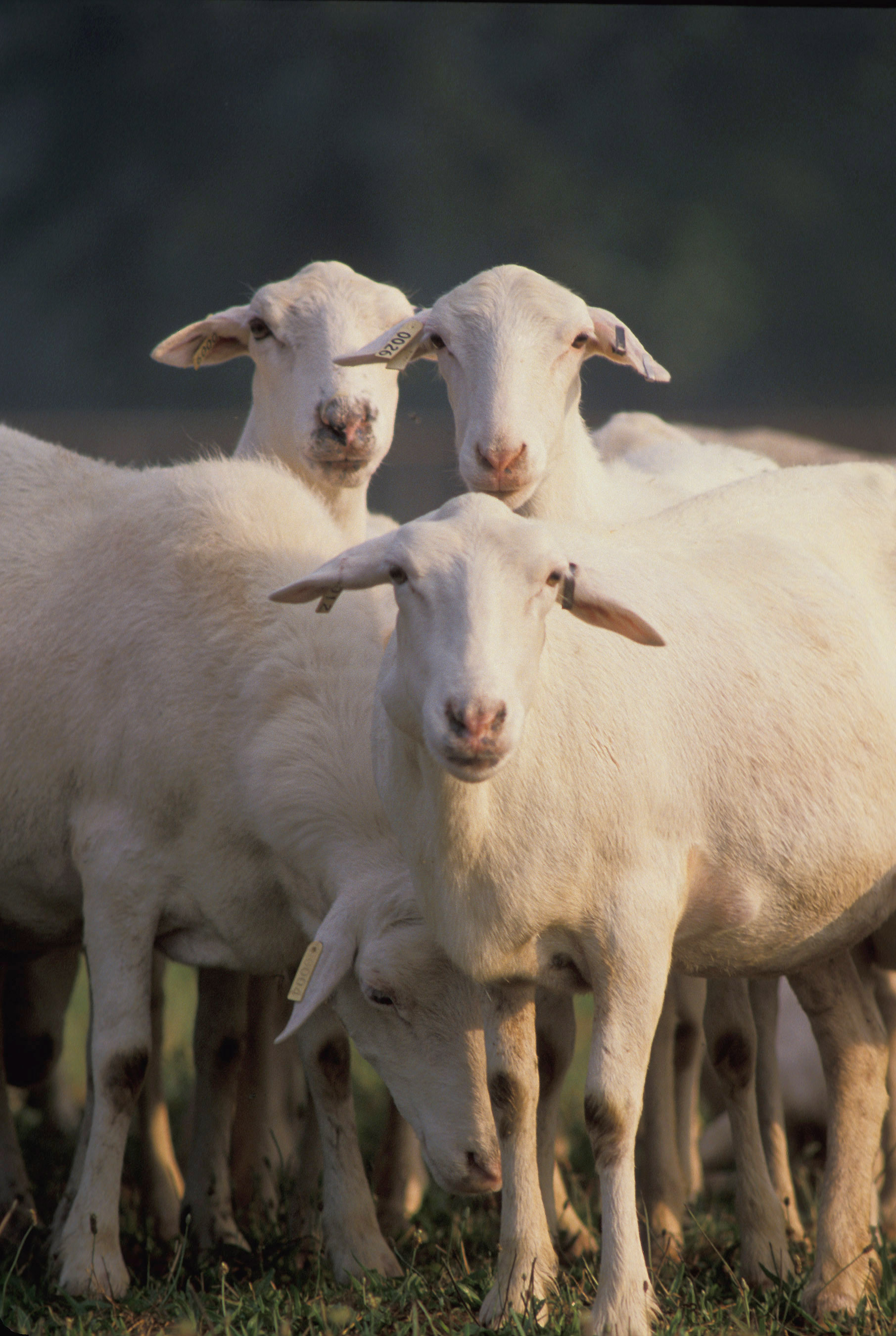
St. Croix sheep

The St Croix (Saint 'Croy') is a breed of domestic sheep native to the U.S. Virgin Islands and named for the island of Saint Croix. They were originally called Virgin Island White because those that were imported into North America were selected for white coloration. However, they come in shades of or with spots that are brown, white, and black.

The breed is believed to be descended from African sheep that were brought to the Caribbean on slave ships and is a breed of hair sheep which does not grow wool. The St Croix is a hardy tropical breed known for its parasite resistance, and is raised primarily for meat production. Breeders have crossbred the St Croix with other breeds to impart these important traits into their bloodlines.

== Characteristics ==
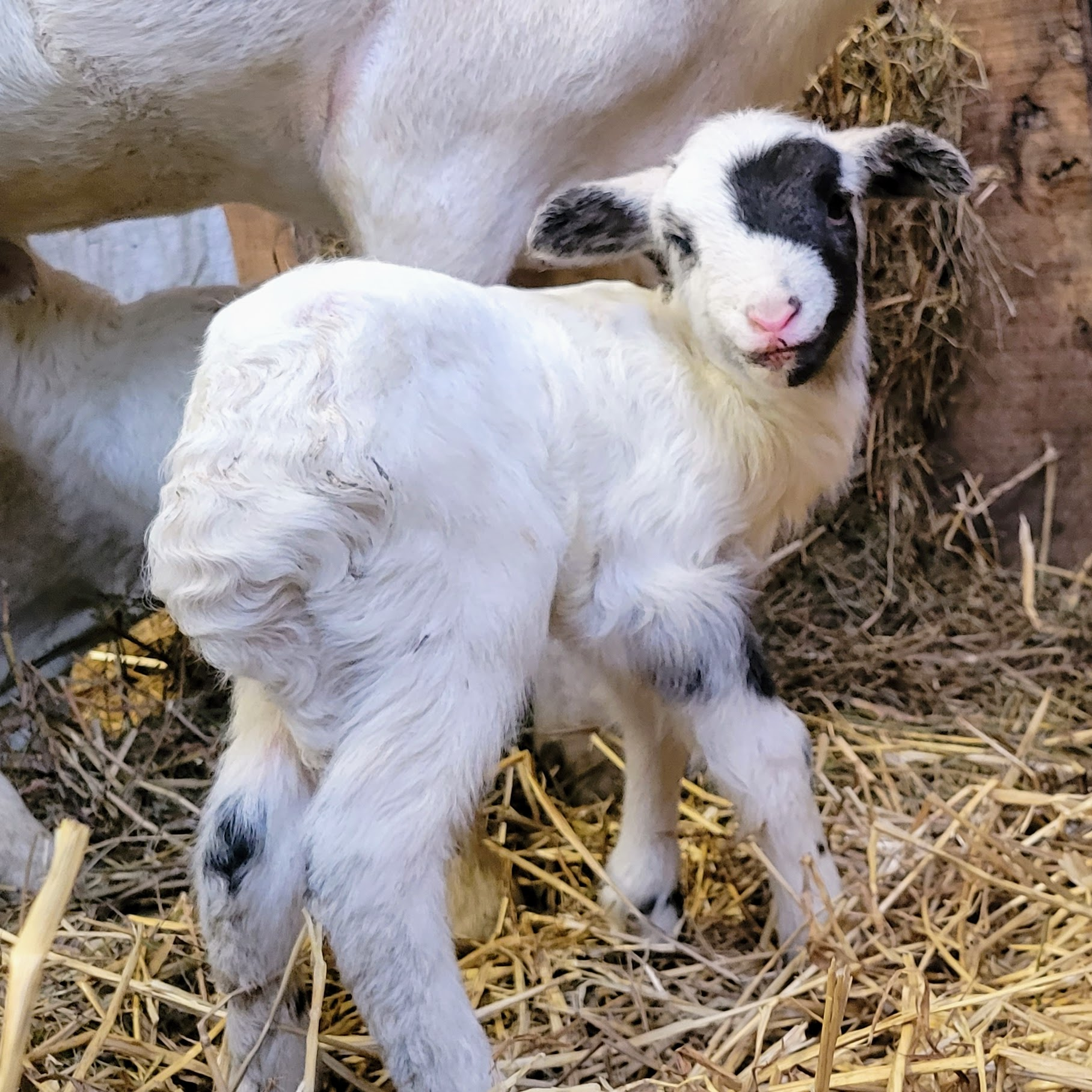
A purebred St. Croix lamb with color

Most St. Croix are completely white with others being solid tan, brown, black or white with brown or black spots. Ewes and rams are almost always polled (no horns), and rams have a large throat ruff. Mature ewes weigh 68 kg (150 lbs) and rams weigh 90 kg (200 lbs). Birth weights average 2.7 kg (6 lbs) to 3.1 kg (7 lbs). As hair sheep, there is no need to dock their tails.

== Adaptability ==
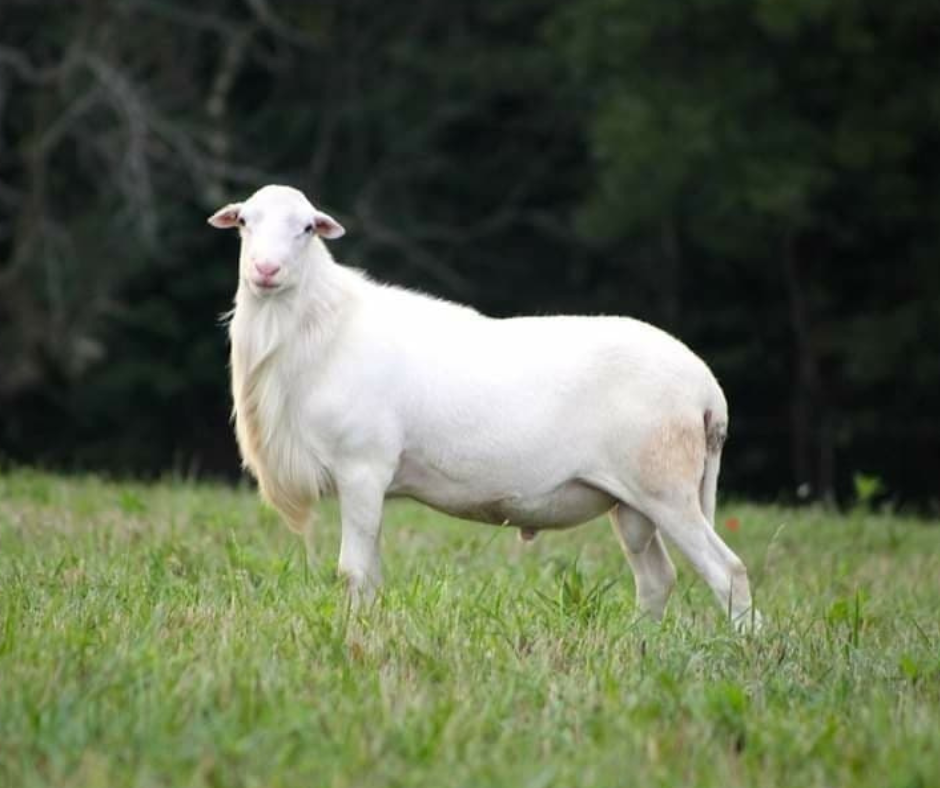
A St. Croix ram.

St. Croix sheep can live in a wide variety of climates. They are well adapted to the hot humid climate of the tropics and can survive in cold temperatures. Due to shedding, their hair coat keeps them cool in warmer temperatures and makes them fly strike resistant. They grow a thick wool coat in cold temperatures that they shed naturally as the weather warms up. Their coat also sheds water. Research studies have indicated that these sheep are more resistant to parasites than other breeds.

== Reproduction ==
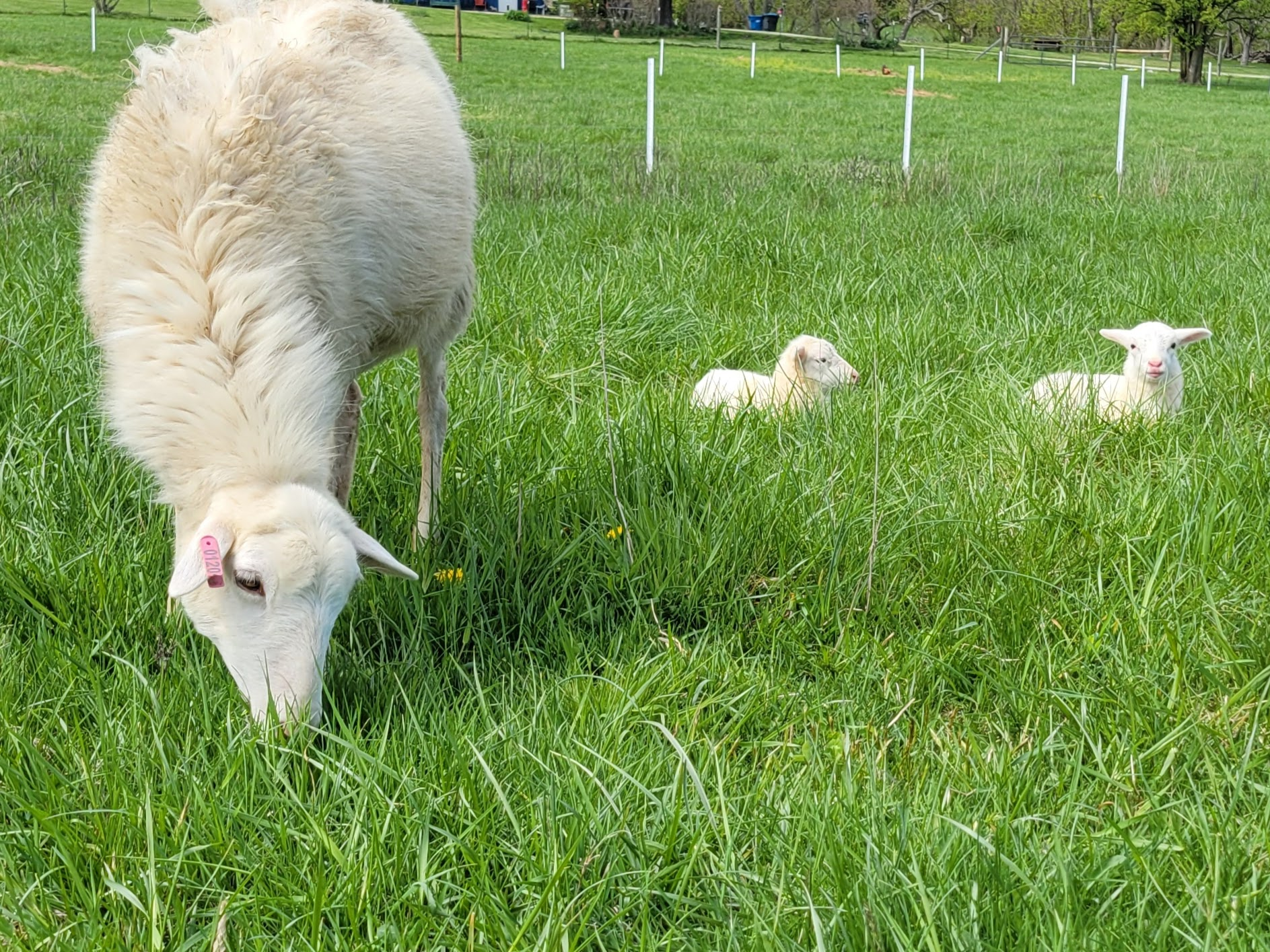
Year old St. Croix ewe with lambs

Ewes and rams hit puberty at younger ages than many other breeds. Ram lambs should be separated after 75 days to prevent impregnation of ewes. Ewe lambs often have their first estrus cycle at 5-6 months, but do not reach adequate size for breeding until the age of 7–8 months. Ewes will ovulate during all months of the year, not following a seasonal breeding period like most sheep. Ewes can lamb at 12 months of age. Ewes can have two lamb crops in a year, sometimes three in two years. One to four lambs in one lamb crop are possible, with twins being most common. St. Croix sheep have a high lamb survivability and the ewes are instinctive mothers, usually not requiring much help. Ewes also produce plenty of milk for their lambs.

== Milking ==
St. Croix ewes produce milk high in butterfat, like other sheep. In some regions of the United States, ewes are milked for cheese production, although the breed is not generally considered a dairy sheep as its focus.

== As meat ==
Lambs finish with a minimal amount of fat and have a small bone to fat ratio. Meat from their carcass is lean and without the tallow taste, as well as naturally low in cholesterol. Flavor and aroma is described as mild. Meat is judged as having good flavor, juiciness, and tenderness. Lambs have a slightly slower growing rate than most sheep breeds.

== Temperament ==
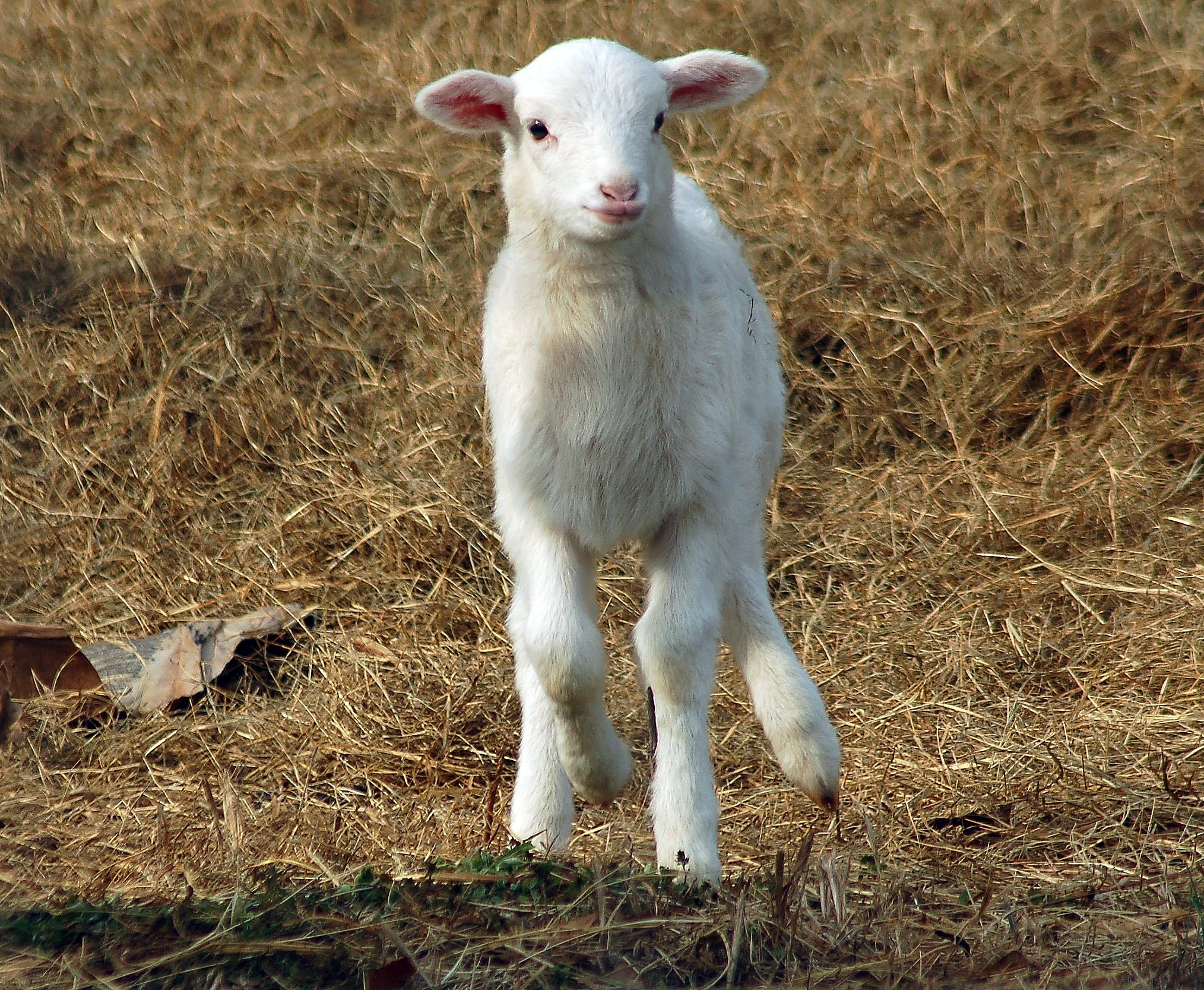
A St. Croix lamb

St. Croix are easy to handle livestock. Sheep are active without showing signs of being wild or flighty. Charging and head butting is uncommon behavior in rams. Sheep tend to be comfortable around people. St. Croix have a good herding instinct and are often used to train herding dogs.

== Other ==
St. Croix sheep are both grazers and browsers. They are not selective eaters. Sheep have been used for weed control due to their preference for weeds.
