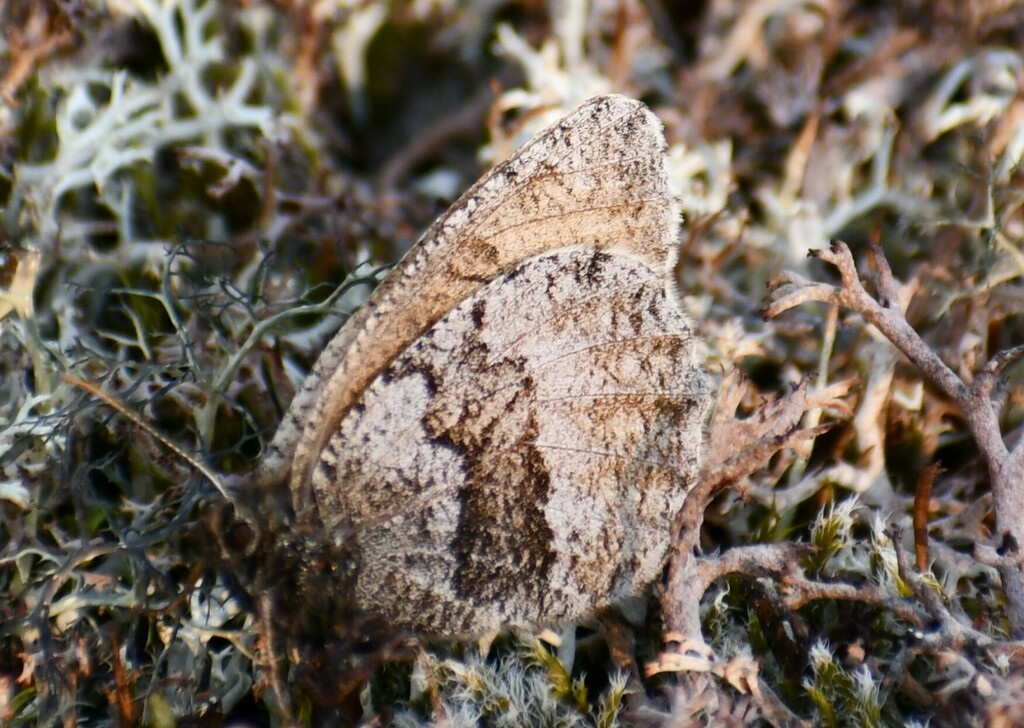

Scientific classification
- Kingdom: Animalia
- Phylum: Arthropoda
- Clade: Pancrustacea
- Class: Insecta
- Order: Lepidoptera
- Family: Nymphalidae
- Genus: Oeneis
- Species: O. polixenes

Binomial name
- Oeneis polixenes (Fabricius, 1775)

Synonyms
- Papilio polixenes Fabricius, 1775; Oeneis crambis Freyer, 1845; Oeneis oeno antonovae Lukhtanov, 1989; Chionobas katahdin Newcomb, 1901; Hipparchia subhyalina Curtis, 1835; Chionobas brucei Edwards, 1891; Chionobas peartiae Edwards, 1897

= Oeneis polixenes =

Polixenes Arctic

Species of butterfly

Oeneis polixenes, the Polixenes Arctic or Norique Alpin, is a species of butterfly in the subfamily Satyrinae. It has a circumpolar distribution, occurring in northern parts of North America, the Arctic Urals, Kamtchatka, Yakutia, Chukchi Peninsula, and northern Siberia.

== Description ==
The wingspan is 33–51 mm. The dorsal wings are dark grey brown, with orange patches near the wing margins. The upperside of the hindwings are a darker grey medially.

== Distribution ==
O. polixenes occurs in northern Canada from coastal Newfoundland to the Yukon.

== Subspecies ==
Listed alphabetically:

- O. p. antonovae Lukhtanov, 1989 – northern Siberia (Gyda Peninsula, Taimyr Peninsula, Wrangel Island)
- O. p. yukonensis Gibson, 1920 – south western Yukon
- O. p. beringiana Kurentzov, 1970 – eastern Chukot Region
- O. p. katahdin (Newcomb, 1901) – Maine (Mt. Katahdin)
- O. p. luteus Troubridge & Parshall, 1988 – Manitoba, Alberta, British Columbia, Northwest Territories, Yukon, Alaska
- O. p. peartiae (Edwards, 1897) – Baffin
- O. p. polixenes – Labrador, Quebec
- O. p. subhyalina (Curtis, 1835) – Arctic Canada
- O. p. woodi Troubridge & Parshall, 1988 – Arctic coast (Yukon, Alaska)
- O. p. yukonensis Gibson, 1920 – south western Yukon

== Similar species ==
- Philip's Arctic (O. rosovi)
- White-veined Arctic (O. bore)
- Melissa Arctic (O. melissa)
