= Katahdin (steamboat) =

- KATAHDIN (Lake Boat)
- U.S. National Register of Historic Places
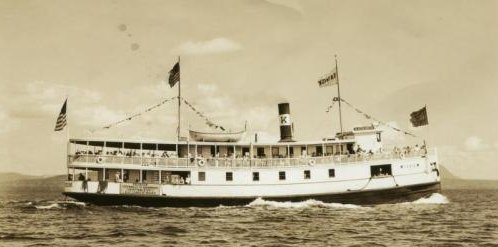
- Katahdin plies Moosehead Lake c. 1920

- Location within Maine Location within the United States
- Location: Moosehead Lake, Greenville, Maine
- Coordinates: 45°28′9″N 69°37′17″W
- Area: less than one acre
- Built by: Bath Iron Works
- Architectural style: Lake boat
- NRHP reference No.: 78003435
- Added to NRHP: September 13, 1978

The Katahdin is a historic steamboat berthed on Moosehead Lake in Greenville, Maine. Built in 1914 at the Bath Iron Works, it at first served the tourist trade on the lake before being converted to a towboat hauling lumber. It was fully restored in the 1990s by the nonprofit Moosehead Maritime Museum, and is again giving tours on the lake. One of the very few surviving early lake boats in Maine, and the oldest vessel afloat built at Bath, it was listed on the National Register of Historic Places in 1978.

== Description ==
Katahdin is a bluff-bowed steamer, 102 feet (31 m) long, with a beam of 28 feet (8.5 m) and a hull depth of 9 feet (2.7 m). Its hull is steel, with two wooden decks. Its typical draft is 3 feet 9 inches (1.14 m). The original configuration included enclosed passenger spaces on two decks, with an open area at the stern on the lower deck, and surrounding the enclosed area on the upper deck. The pilot house is located at the front of the upper deck enclosure. The main passenger entryways are located on the lower deck on either side of the pilot house.

Katahdin was built in 1914 at the Bath Iron Works for the Coburn Steamship Company, and is the oldest vessel afloat built at Bath. It was shipped in sections to Greenville, where final assembly took place. The primary use when launched was to deliver tourists and supplies to the Mount Kineo Resort from Greenville Junction, but it also offered cruises on the lake.

The Great Depression and the increased use of the automobile for leisure transportation led to a decline in demand, and it made the last tourist trip in 1938. In 1940 it was acquired by a paper company (later itself merged into the Scott Paper Company), and converted for use as a towboat hauling timber across the lake. This conversion included the removal of the promenade areas of the decks, and the replacement of the steam plant by a diesel engine. It continued in this use until 1976.

Not long afterward, a local nonprofit, the Moosehead Marine Museum, was organized to preserve the boat. It was sufficiently restored to provide tours of the lake, and again began serving the tourist trade. After a major fundraising effort begun in 1993, it was fully restored, including a replating of the hull by the Bath Iron Works. The upper deck is now fiberglass, and the promenades have been restored. In 2012 the keel was replaced.

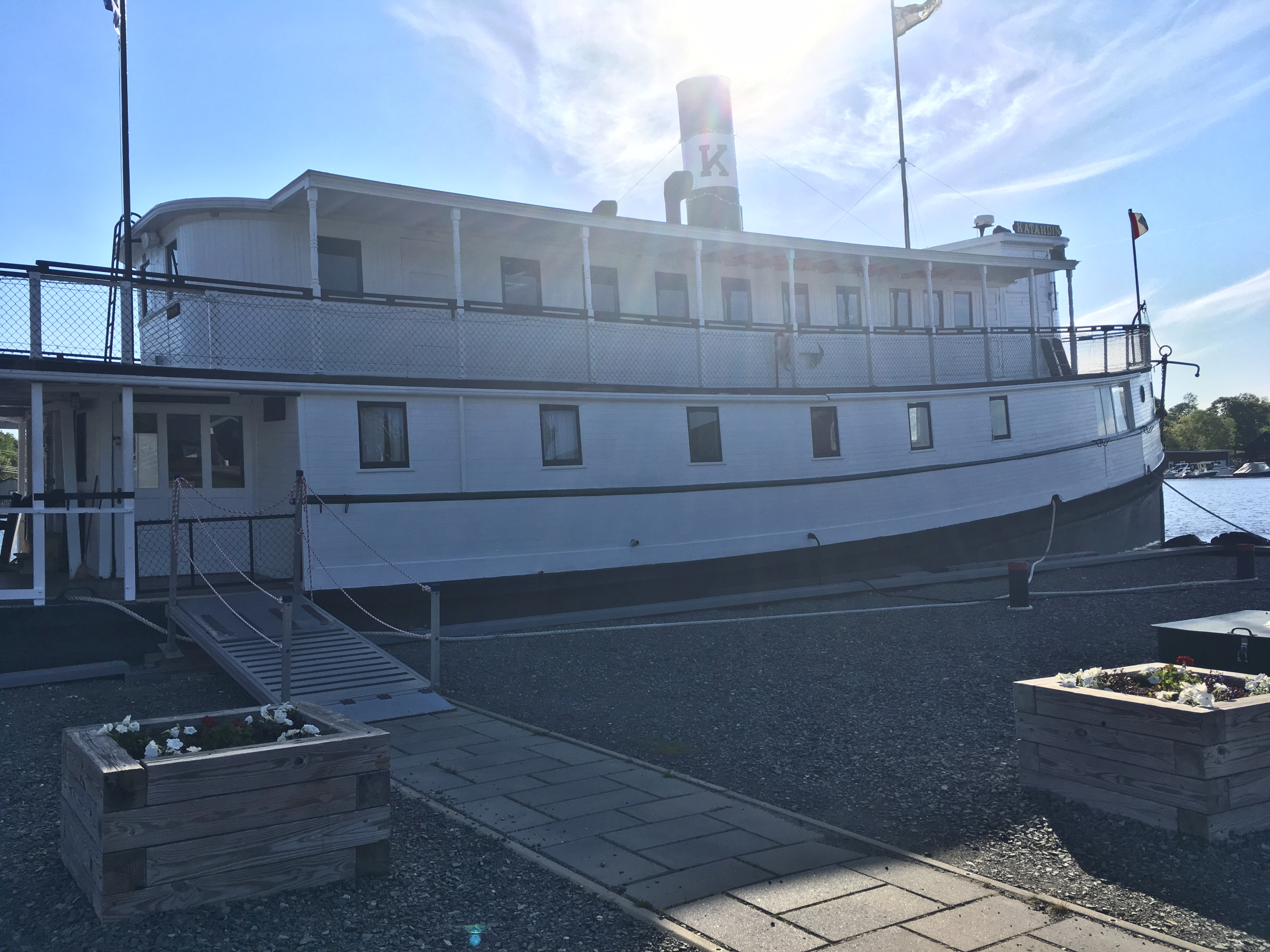
Katahdin in 2019

Katahdin now offers cruises between June and October, traveling either 12 or 20 miles (19 or 32 km) up the lake, in cruises with durations of 3 and 4 1/2 hours. It is also available for hire for private events.

== See also ==
- National Register of Historic Places listings in Piscataquis County, Maine
