= Moosehead Lake =

Lake in Maine, United States

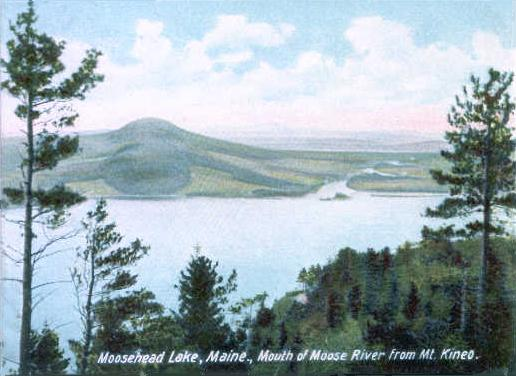

- Location within Maine
- Location: Northwest Piscataquis, Maine, United States
- Coordinates: 45°38′N 69°39′W
- Type: mesotrophic
- Primary inflows: Moose River
- Primary outflows: Kennebec River
- Catchment area: 1,268 square miles (3,280 km^{2})
- Basin countries: United States
- Max. length: 40 miles (64 km)
- Max. width: 10 miles (16 km)
- Surface area: 75,451 acres (30,534 ha)
- Average depth: 55 feet (17 m)
- Max. depth: 246 feet (75 m)
- Water volume: 4,210,000 acre⋅ft (5.19×10^{9} m^{3})
- Residence time: 3.1 years
- Shore length^{1}: 280.8 miles (451.9 km)
- Surface elevation: 1,029 feet (314 m)
- Islands: >80 (Sugar Island)
- ^{1} Shore length is not a well-defined measure.

Moosehead Lake is a deep, coldwater lake located in Piscataquis County in Northwestern Maine. It is the largest lake in Maine and the largest lake wholly within New England, the second-largest lake in New England after Lake Champlain, and the largest mountain lake in the eastern United States. Situated in the mostly undeveloped Longfellow Mountains, the lake is the source of the Kennebec River. Several rural townships border the lake. Greenville is by far the largest town on the lake, with a small downtown area that has banks, shops, and restaurants. There are over 80 islands in the lake, the largest being Sugar Island and Deer Island to the west being the second largest.

== History ==
Mount Kineo, with 700-foot (210 m) cliffs rising straight up from Moosehead Lake, has attracted visitors for centuries, from early American Indians (Red Paint People), to later tribes seeking its rhyolite to make stone tools, Penobscots and Norridgewocks, the Abenaki bands who battled here with their enemy the Mohawks, to 19th-century "rusticators" traveling by railroad and steamboat and today's hotel guests. Various species dwell among its cliffs and talus slopes, including peregrine falcons and rare plants.

The Moosehead region includes the headwaters of the Kennebec, the West Branch of the Penobscot, the Piscataquis, the Pleasant, and the Saint John rivers. Henry David Thoreau and other 19th-century visitors remarked on the beauty of the area. Thoreau described the lake as “...a gleaming silver platter at the end of the table.”

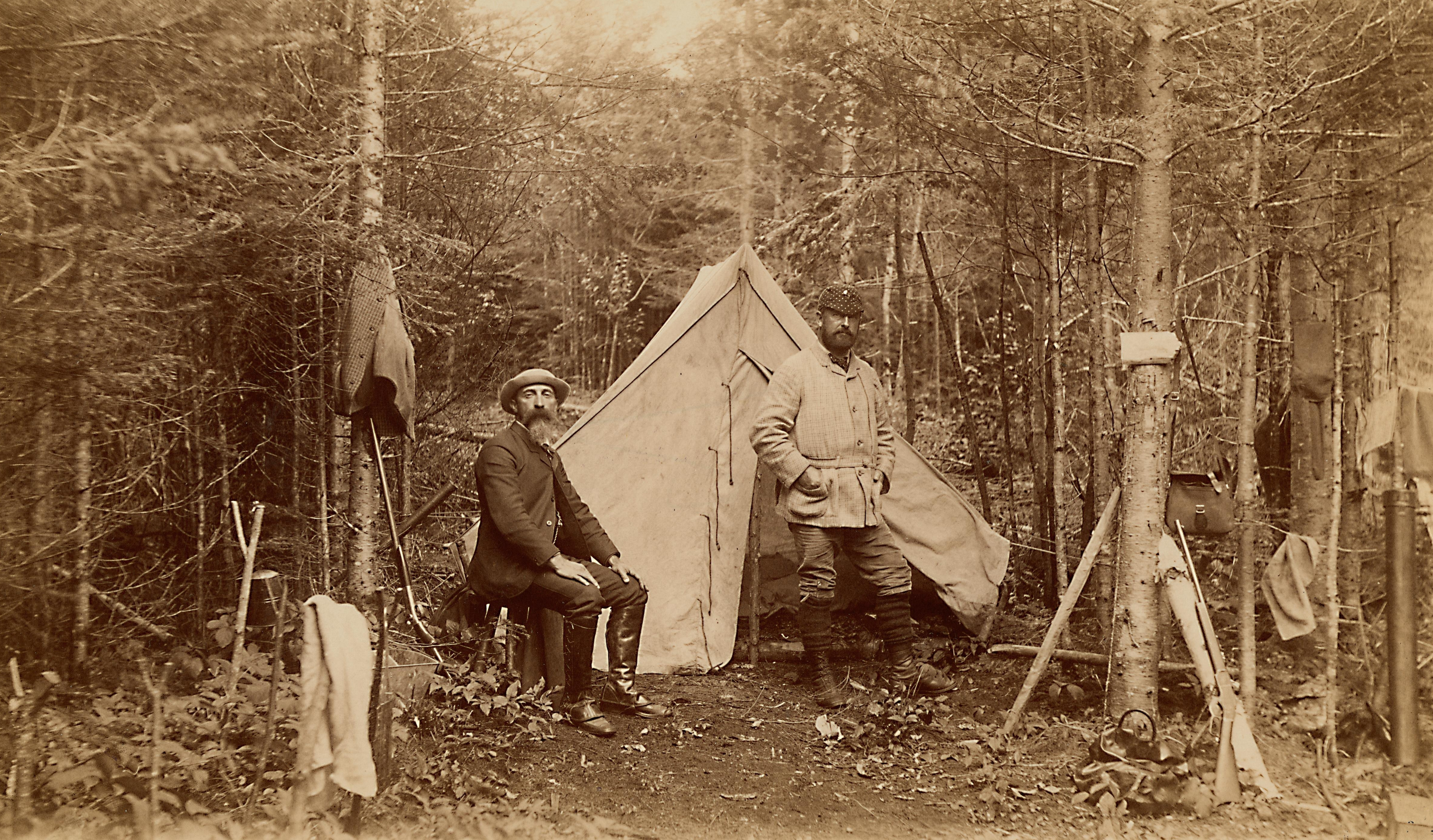
Hunters at Camp Russell, northeast of Moosehead Lake, 1888

The region has a large moose population; moose outnumber people 3:1. However, the name of the region derives from the remarkable similarity between maps of the lake and an antlered moose.

== Geography ==
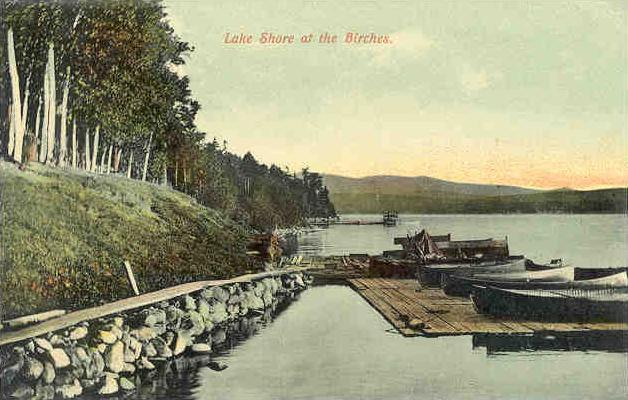
Shoreline in 1912

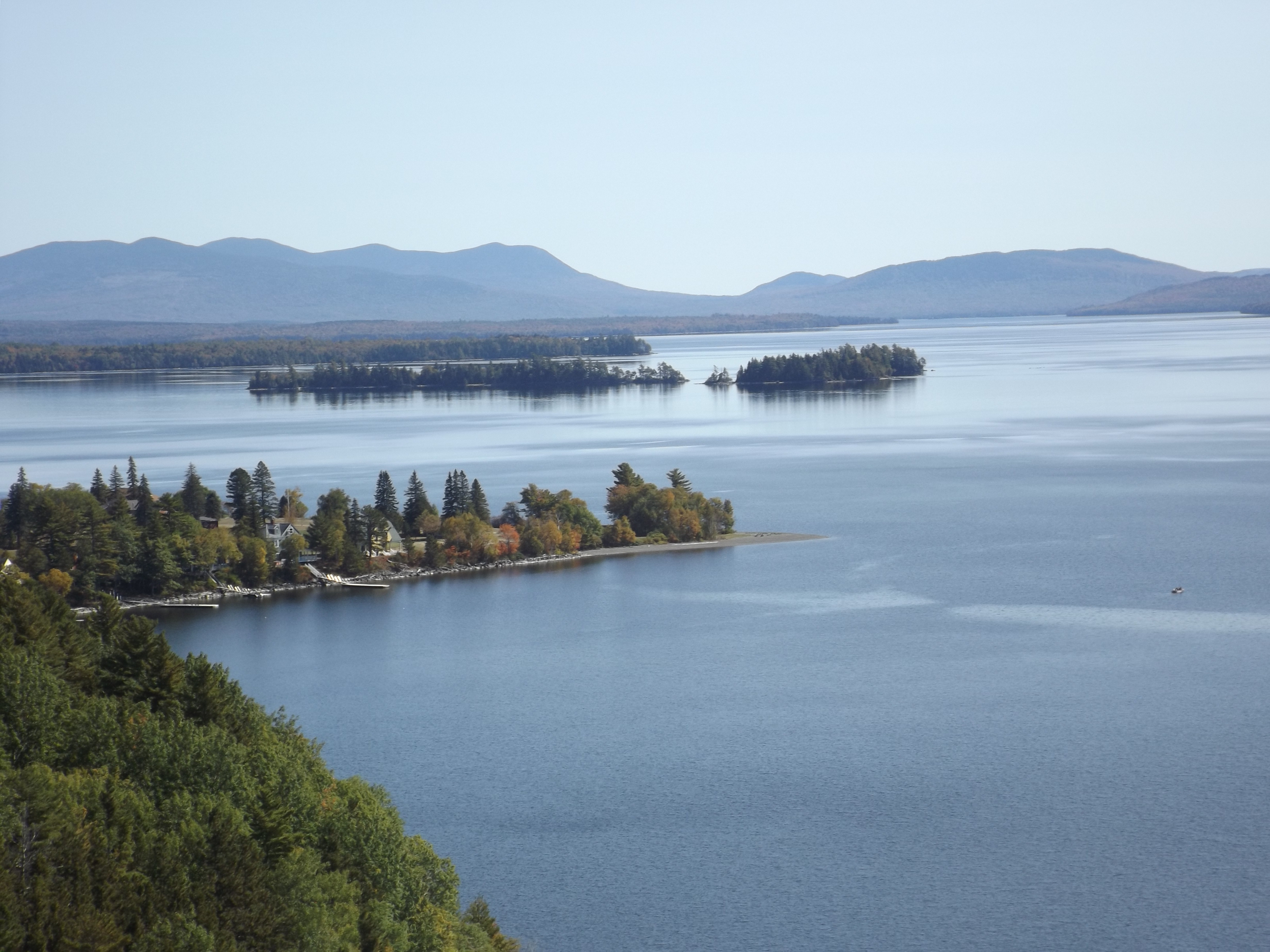
Islands in Moosehead Lake, Maine

Set at an elevation of 1,023 feet (312 m), Moosehead Lake is approx. 40 by 10 miles (64 by 16 km), with an area of nearly 118 mile² (approx. 303 km^{2}), and over 400 miles (640 km) of shoreline. Its major inlet is the Moose River, which, east of Jackman, flows through Long Pond to Brassua Lake. To the east of Moosehead Lake, the Roach River is its second largest tributary. Flowing out of Moosehead Lake to the southwest are its east and west outlets—the Kennebec River.

The Moosehead Lake Region encompasses 4,400 square miles (11,000 km^{2}) of North Central Maine, and includes 127 incorporated and unincorporated townships in addition to Moosehead Lake. The region is drained by 330 miles (530 km) of main stem rivers, into which flow 3,850 miles (6,200 km) of smaller tributaries. During the last glacial era, more than 1,200 natural lakes and ponds were carved into its landscape, varying in size from one acre (4,000 m^{2}) ponds to Moosehead which, at 75,451 acres (305.34 km^{2}), is one of the largest natural freshwater lakes in the United States. The total area of all standing surface waters in the region is more than 238,000 acres (960 km^{2}) – 24% of the total area of lakes and ponds in Maine.

== Climate ==
There is a weather station in the unincorporated namesake community of Moosehead on the middle part of the western lakeshore. The area has a humid continental climate (Köppen Dfb). Winters are cold and snowy, whereas summers are mild due to its relative elevation. The annual temperature of about 40 °F (4 °C) are similar to Quebec City in the St. Lawrence River valley further north and much colder than Maine's and the nearby Canadian maritime provinces' coastal areas. Winter temperatures are similar to subarctic inland northern Sweden and Finland and as a result, boreal forests dominate the shoreline in spite of being in the mid-latitudes. Because of its cold climate, the lake becomes completely frozen over for about 5 months each year.

Climate data for Moosehead, Maine, 1991–2020 averages, extremes 1931–present
| Month | Jan | Feb | Mar | Apr | May | Jun | Jul | Aug | Sep | Oct | Nov | Dec | Year |
|---|---|---|---|---|---|---|---|---|---|---|---|---|---|
| Record high °F (°C) | 58 (14) | 64 (18) | 77 (25) | 87 (31) | 91 (33) | 97 (36) | 93 (34) | 96 (36) | 95 (35) | 84 (29) | 73 (23) | 68 (20) | 97 (36) |
| Mean maximum °F (°C) | 43.3 (6.3) | 45.1 (7.3) | 53.1 (11.7) | 71.6 (22.0) | 83.8 (28.8) | 87.1 (30.6) | 88.2 (31.2) | 86.8 (30.4) | 83.6 (28.7) | 73.9 (23.3) | 61.0 (16.1) | 49.3 (9.6) | 90.5 (32.5) |
| Mean daily maximum °F (°C) | 23.4 (−4.8) | 26.5 (−3.1) | 35.6 (2.0) | 48.1 (8.9) | 62.7 (17.1) | 71.6 (22.0) | 76.5 (24.7) | 75.5 (24.2) | 67.8 (19.9) | 53.8 (12.1) | 40.7 (4.8) | 29.3 (−1.5) | 51.0 (10.6) |
| Daily mean °F (°C) | 13.0 (−10.6) | 14.3 (−9.8) | 23.9 (−4.5) | 37.2 (2.9) | 50.8 (10.4) | 60.0 (15.6) | 65.3 (18.5) | 63.3 (17.4) | 56.0 (13.3) | 43.8 (6.6) | 32.4 (0.2) | 20.6 (−6.3) | 40.1 (4.5) |
| Mean daily minimum °F (°C) | 2.6 (−16.3) | 2.0 (−16.7) | 12.2 (−11.0) | 26.4 (−3.1) | 38.9 (3.8) | 48.4 (9.1) | 54.2 (12.3) | 51.2 (10.7) | 44.2 (6.8) | 33.8 (1.0) | 24.1 (−4.4) | 11.9 (−11.2) | 29.2 (−1.6) |
| Mean minimum °F (°C) | −18.5 (−28.1) | −17.8 (−27.7) | −12.2 (−24.6) | 13.0 (−10.6) | 25.0 (−3.9) | 35.9 (2.2) | 43.0 (6.1) | 40.4 (4.7) | 29.1 (−1.6) | 21.9 (−5.6) | 8.4 (−13.1) | −8.5 (−22.5) | −22.0 (−30.0) |
| Record low °F (°C) | −33 (−36) | −30 (−34) | −29 (−34) | 3 (−16) | 19 (−7) | 30 (−1) | 34 (1) | 30 (−1) | 20 (−7) | 14 (−10) | −10 (−23) | −28 (−33) | −33 (−36) |
| Average precipitation inches (mm) | 2.69 (68) | 2.27 (58) | 2.76 (70) | 3.28 (83) | 3.43 (87) | 4.39 (112) | 4.03 (102) | 3.85 (98) | 3.42 (87) | 4.45 (113) | 3.42 (87) | 3.50 (89) | 41.49 (1,054) |
| Average snowfall inches (cm) | 20.2 (51) | 21.6 (55) | 18.4 (47) | 7.5 (19) | 0.3 (0.76) | 0.0 (0.0) | 0.0 (0.0) | 0.0 (0.0) | 0.0 (0.0) | 1.2 (3.0) | 6.5 (17) | 22.6 (57) | 98.3 (249.76) |
| Average extreme snow depth inches (cm) | 18.9 (48) | 22.3 (57) | 26.2 (67) | 17.5 (44) | 0.4 (1.0) | 0.0 (0.0) | 0.0 (0.0) | 0.0 (0.0) | 0.0 (0.0) | 0.8 (2.0) | 3.7 (9.4) | 12.8 (33) | 28.9 (73) |
| Average precipitation days (≥ 0.01 in) | 12.1 | 10.8 | 11.3 | 12.0 | 14.1 | 13.8 | 14.6 | 12.9 | 10.7 | 13.3 | 12.5 | 13.9 | 152.0 |
| Average snowy days (≥ 0.1 in) | 11.3 | 10.2 | 8.7 | 3.8 | 0.2 | 0.0 | 0.0 | 0.0 | 0.0 | 0.7 | 4.9 | 10.8 | 50.6 |
Source 1: NOAA
Source 2: National Weather Service

== Development plans ==
Seattle-based Plum Creek Real Estate Investment Corporation, the largest private United States landowner, submitted a development proposal for the Moosehead region in April 2005. It was the largest development ever proposed for the state of Maine. The initial version of the scheme called for 975 house lots, two resorts, a golf course, a marina, three RV parks, and more than 100 rental cabins. However, Plum Creek was defunct as of 2016 and all development plans have been cancelled.

In January 2021, a $75 million investment was made into developing the 1,700-acre Big Squaw Mountain Resort into a year-round tourist attraction that would include a new ski-lift system, a large hotel, lakefront condominiums, and a marina. The plans are being made by local developer Perry Williams, along with Louisiana-based developers at Provident Resources Group.
