= Moose River (Maine) =

River in Maine, United States

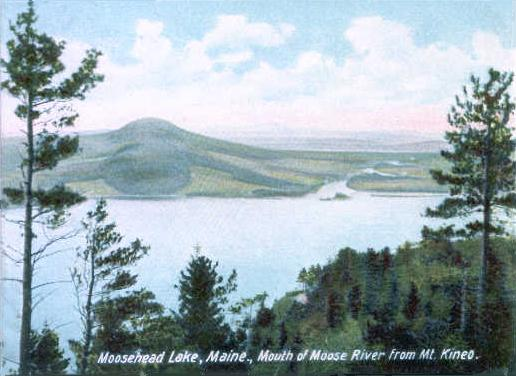

- Location within Maine Location within the United States

Location
- Country: United States

Physical characteristics
- Source
  - location: Maine
  - elevation: 1,930 feet (590 m)
- Mouth
  - location: Moosehead Lake
  - coordinates: 45°40′55″N 69°45′58″W
  - elevation: 1,029 feet (314 m)
- Length: 83 miles (134 km)

Basin features
- River system: Kennebec River
- Tributaries
  - right: South Branch Moose River

The Moose River is an 83-mile-long (134 km) river in Maine. Its source (45°32′24″N 70°41′46″W) is in Beattie (Maine Township 2, Range 8, WBKP), on the Canada–United States border, which runs along the height of land between the watersheds of the Kennebec River in Maine and the Chaudière River in Quebec. From there, the river runs east through Attean Pond and Wood Pond, past the town of Moose River, then through Long Pond and Brassua Lake. The Moose River empties into Moosehead Lake, the source of the Kennebec River, in Rockwood Strip (T1, R1, WBKP). The International Railway of Maine was built along Moose River in 1889.

== Attean Pond ==
Attean Pond
- Location within Maine
- Location: Somerset County, Maine
- Coordinates: 45°34′10″N 70°18′00″W
- Max. length: 5 mi (8.0 km)
- Surface area: 2,880 acres (1,170 ha)
- Max. depth: 55 ft (17 m)
- Water volume: 37,037 acre⋅ft (45,684,000 m^{3})
- Surface elevation: 1,159 ft (353 m)

Attean Pond covers the southeast corner of Attean Township. Moose River flows into the south end of Attean Pond from Bradstreet Township and overflows from the northeast corner of the Attean Pond. A second major tributary from Holeb Pond enters the western end of Attean Pond. Smaller tributary Williams Brook reaches the eastern shore of Attean pond, while Thompson Brook and McKenney Brook enter the east bank of Moose River between Attean Pond and Big Wood Pond. The railroad follows the southern shore of Holeb Pond and crosses the tributary to follow the northern shore of Attean Pond. The western end of the pond, known as The Narrows, reaches the maximum depth of 55 feet (17 m), making it the best region to fish for Salmon, while the remainder of the pond is less than 20 feet (6.1 m) deep and better suited for yellow perch than for trout. Of the 2,745 acres, only 600 acres are deeper than 20 ft.

== Wood Pond ==
Big Wood Pond
- Wood Pond
- Location within Maine
- Location: Somerset County
- Coordinates: 45°37′N 70°17′W
- Max. length: 3.7 mi (6.0 km)
- Surface area: 2,168 acres (877 ha)
- Max. depth: 72 feet (22 m)
- Water volume: 54,810 acre⋅ft (67,610,000 m^{3})

Big Wood Pond or Wood Pond covers the northeast corner of Attean Township on the western edge of the town of Jackman, Maine. The main inflow is Moose River entering the south end of Big Wood Pond less than a mile downstream of Attean Pond. The second major tributary is Wood Stream flowing approximately 11 miles (18 km) from the Quebec border through Little Big Wood Pond into the west side of Big Wood Pond. Gander Brook with a length of 4.5 miles (7.2 km) flows into the north end of Big Wood Pond. The railroad crosses Moose River at the inlet and follows the eastern shore of the pond into Jackman Station. Moose River leaves Wood Pond through the town of Jackman.

== Long Pond ==
Long Pond
- Location within Maine
- Location: Somerset County
- Coordinates: 45°37′20″N 70°03′00″W
- Max. length: 8 mi (13 km)
- Surface area: 2,951 acres (1,194 ha)
- Max. depth: 44 feet (13 m)
- Water volume: 17,585 acre⋅ft (21,691,000 m^{3})

Moose River enters the western end of Long Pond approximately 7 miles (11 km) downstream of Jackman. Long Pond is less than a mile wide through the town of Jackman and Long Pond Township. The railroad follows the south shore. Tributaries Mountain Brook and Parlin Stream flow into the south side of the pond and Churchill Stream flows into the north side before Moose River overflows from the east end of the pond.

== Brassua Lake ==
Brassua Lake
- Location within Maine
- Location: Somerset County
- Coordinates: 45°40′N 69°51′W
- Max. length: 8 mi (13 km)
- Surface area: 9,454 acres (3,826 ha)
- Max. depth: 65 feet (20 m)
- Water volume: 275,166 acre⋅ft (339,412,000 m^{3})
- Surface elevation: 1,073 ft (327 m)

Brassua Lake occupies the southeast corner of Brassua Township, the southwest corner of Tomhegan Township, the center of Rockwood Strip, the northeast corner of Sandwich Academy Grant, and the northwest corner of Taunton and Rayham Academy Grant. Moose River enters the western end of the lake 4 miles (6.4 km) downstream of Long Pond and overflows from the eastern shore of the lake 3 miles (4.8 km) upstream of Moosehead Lake. Misery Stream flows 7 miles (11 km) from Misery Pond into the south end of Brassua Lake, and Brassua Stream flows 9 miles (14 km) into the north end of the lake. The railroad follows the southeastern shore of Brassua Lake before turning south to follow the western shore of Moosehead Lake.

== See also ==
- List of rivers of Maine
