= VolturnUS =

Floating structure

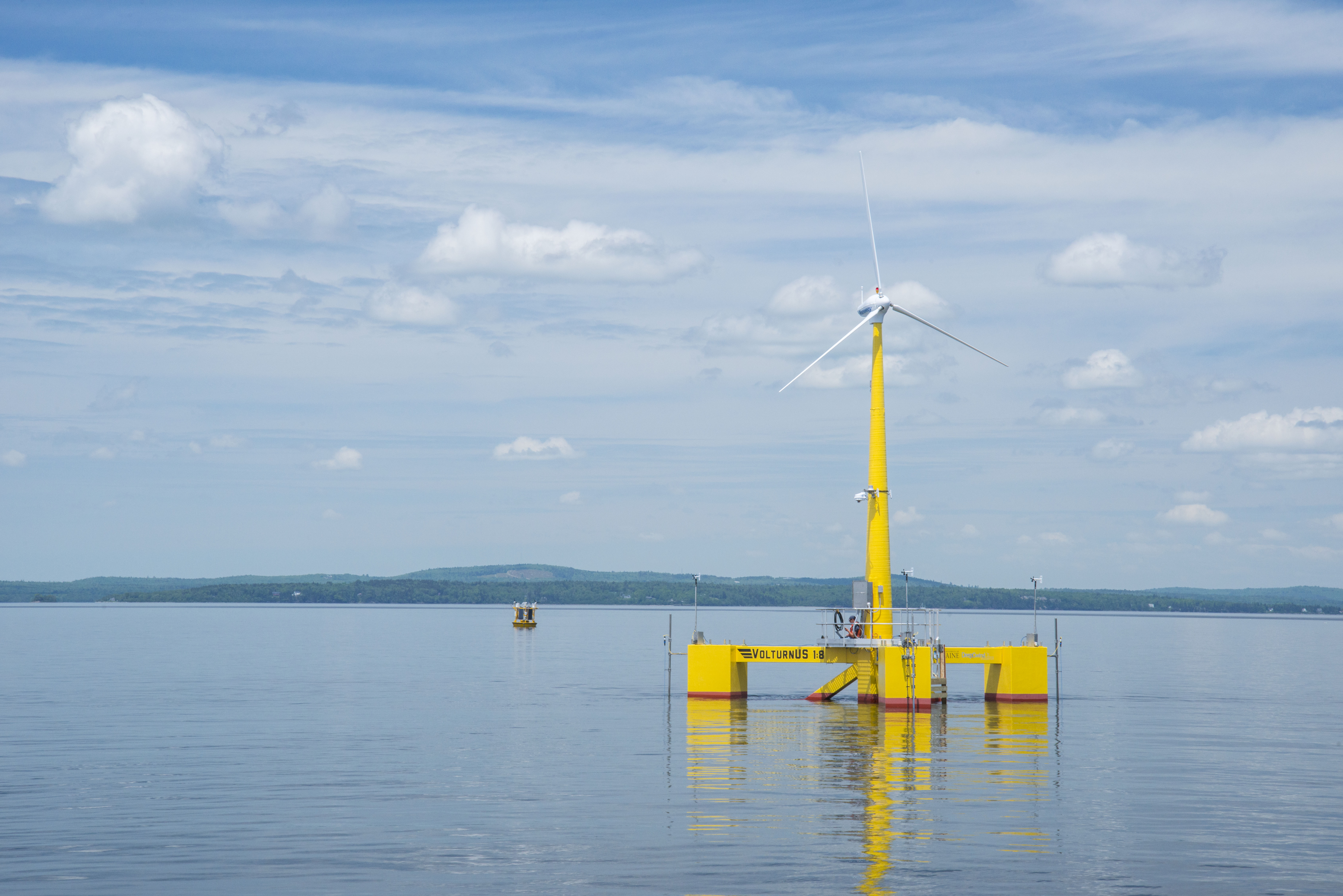
University of Maine's VolturnUS 1:8 was the first grid-connected offshore wind turbine in the Americas. The VolturnUS design utilizes a concrete semisubmersible floating hull and a composite materials tower designed to reduce both capital and Operation & Maintenance costs, and to allow local manufacturing. The VolturnUS technology is the culmination of more than a decade of collaborative research and development conducted by the Advanced Structures and Composites Center-led DeepCwind Consortium.

The VolturnUS is a floating concrete structure that supports a wind turbine, designed by the University of Maine's Advanced Structures and Composites Center and deployed by DeepCwind Consortium in 2013. The VolturnUS can support wind turbines in water depths of 150 ft (46 m) or more. The DeepCwind Consortium and its partners deployed a 1:8 scale VolturnUS in 2013. Efforts are now underway by Maine Aqua Ventus 1, GP, LLC, to deploy to full-scale VolturnUS structures off the coast of Monhegan Island, Maine, in the UMaine Deepwater Offshore Wind Test Site. This demonstration project, known as New England Aqua Ventus I, is planned to deploy two 6 MW wind turbines by 2020.

The University of Maine announced in September 2017 that its VolturnUS design became the first floating offshore wind turbine to meet American Bureau of Shipping requirements for floating offshore wind turbines, demonstrating the feasibility of the VolturnUS concept. The design review was conducted against the American Bureau of Shipping (ABS) Guide for Building and Classing Floating Offshore Wind Turbine Installations.

== History ==
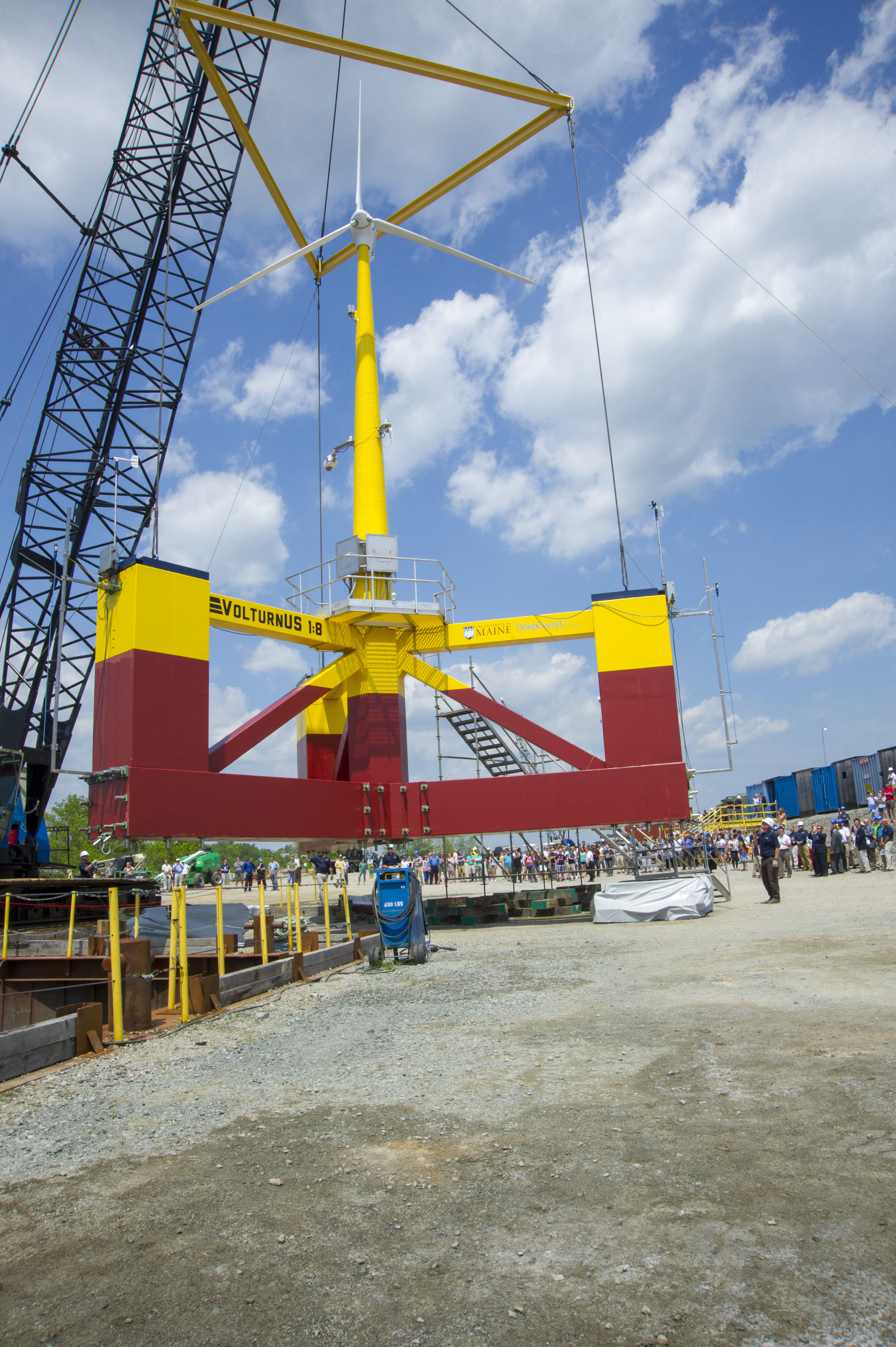
On June 13, 2013, the University of Maine's VolturnUS 1:8 was energized and began delivering electricity through an undersea cable to the Central Maine Power electricity grid, making VolturnUS 1:8 the first grid-connected offshore wind turbine in the Americas.

North America’s first floating grid-connected wind turbine was lowered into the Penobscot River in Maine on 31 May 2013 by the University of Maine Advanced Structures and Composites Center and its partners. The VolturnUS 1:8 was towed down the Penobscot River where it was deployed for 18 months in Castine, ME, along with a UMaine-developed floating LiDAR.

The prototype employs a 20 kW Renewegy VP-20 wind turbine with a 9.6 meters (31 feet) rotor. It is 65 feet (20 meters) tall - that is 1:8 the scale of a 6-megawatt (MW), 450 feet (140 meters) rotor diameter design. The VolturnUS design utilizes a concrete semi-submersible floating hull and a composite materials tower designed to reduce both capital and operation & maintenance costs, and to allow local manufacturing throughout the US and the world. The VolturnUS technology is the culmination of collaborative research and development conducted by the University of Maine-led DeepCwind Consortium.

During its deployment, it experienced numerous storm events representative of design environmental conditions prescribed by the American Bureau of Shipping Guide for Building and Classing Floating Offshore Wind Turbines, 2013. It was taken out of the water in November 2014.

VolturnUS' floating concrete hull technology can support wind turbines in water depths of 45 meters (148 feet) or more, and has the potential to significantly reduce the cost of offshore wind. With 12 independent cost estimates from around the U.S. and the world, it has been found to significantly reduce costs compared to existing floating systems. The design has also received a complete third-party engineering review.

=== Scaling up ===
In June 2016, the UMaine-led New England Aqua Ventus I project won top tier status from the US Department of Energy (DOE) Advanced Technology Demonstration Program for Offshore Wind. This means that the New England Aqua Ventus project is now automatically eligible for an additional $39.9 million in construction funding from the DOE, as long as the project continues to meet its milestones. The developer asserts that the New England Aqua Ventus I project will likely become the first commercial scale floating wind project in the Americas.

U.S. Senators Susan Collins and Angus King announced in June 2016 that Maine’s New England Aqua Ventus I floating offshore wind demonstration project was selected by the U.S. Department of Energy to participate in the Offshore Wind Advanced Technology Demonstration program. The project is opposed by Senator Dow with Bill LR1613.

New England Aqua Ventus I is one of two leading projects that are each eligible for up to $39.9 million in additional funding over three years for the construction phase of the demonstration program.

In 2020, UMaine expected costs to be $74/MWh by 2027 and $57/MWh by 2032. In 2021, Maine applied for an offshore test area.

== See also ==
- Floating wind turbine
- DeepCwind Consortium
- UMaine Deepwater Offshore Wind Test Site
- Wind Power in Maine
- Offshore wind power in the United States
- List of offshore wind farms in the United States
