= Advanced Structures and Composites Center =

Research unit at the University of Maine, US

The organization's logo as of 2012

The Advanced Structures and Composites Center is an independent research unit at the University of Maine that provides research, education, and economic development encompassing material sciences, manufacturing and engineering of composites and structures.

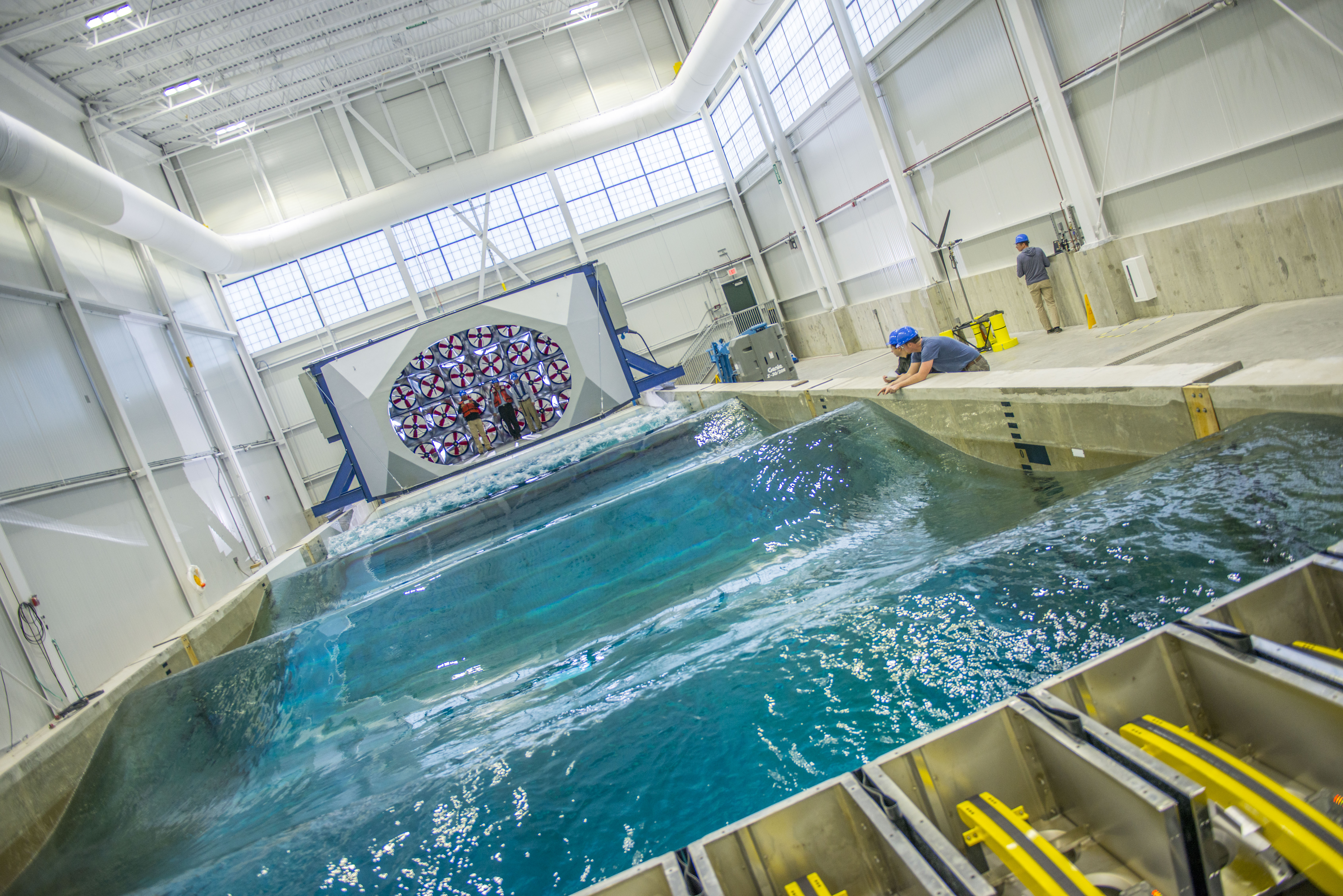
The Alfond W^{2} Ocean Engineering Lab at the UMaine Composites Center is a unique facility equipped with a high-performance rotating wind machine over a wave basin. The facility can simulate 1000+ year return period wind and wave conditions, representing some of the worst storms possible anywhere on earth at 1:50 scale.

The center was founded in 1996 with support from the National Science Foundation by Dr. Habib Dagher, P.E. Annually, the center employs a staff of 180, inclusive of 140 undergraduate and graduate students from a range of academic backgrounds.

The center is housed in a 100,000 square feet (9,300 square meters), ISO 17025 testing laboratory accredited by the International Accreditation Service.

In 2014, the center was designated as a "Signature Research Area" of the University of Maine.

The center has gained national and international recognition for major research and development projects such as the VolturnUS 1:8, the first grid-connected floating offshore wind turbine in the US and the first in the world made out of concrete and composite materials, the inflatable composite arch bridges "Bridge-in-a-Backpack" technology now approved in the American Association of State Highway and Transportation Officials Code, the first Modular Ballistic Protection System (MBPS) approved by the US Army to protect troops in tents from blast and ballistic threats, development of coated wood technology for blast and hurricane resistant wood buildings, and the longest carbon-fiber composite vessel built for the US Navy.

== Dr. Habib Dagher, P.E. ==
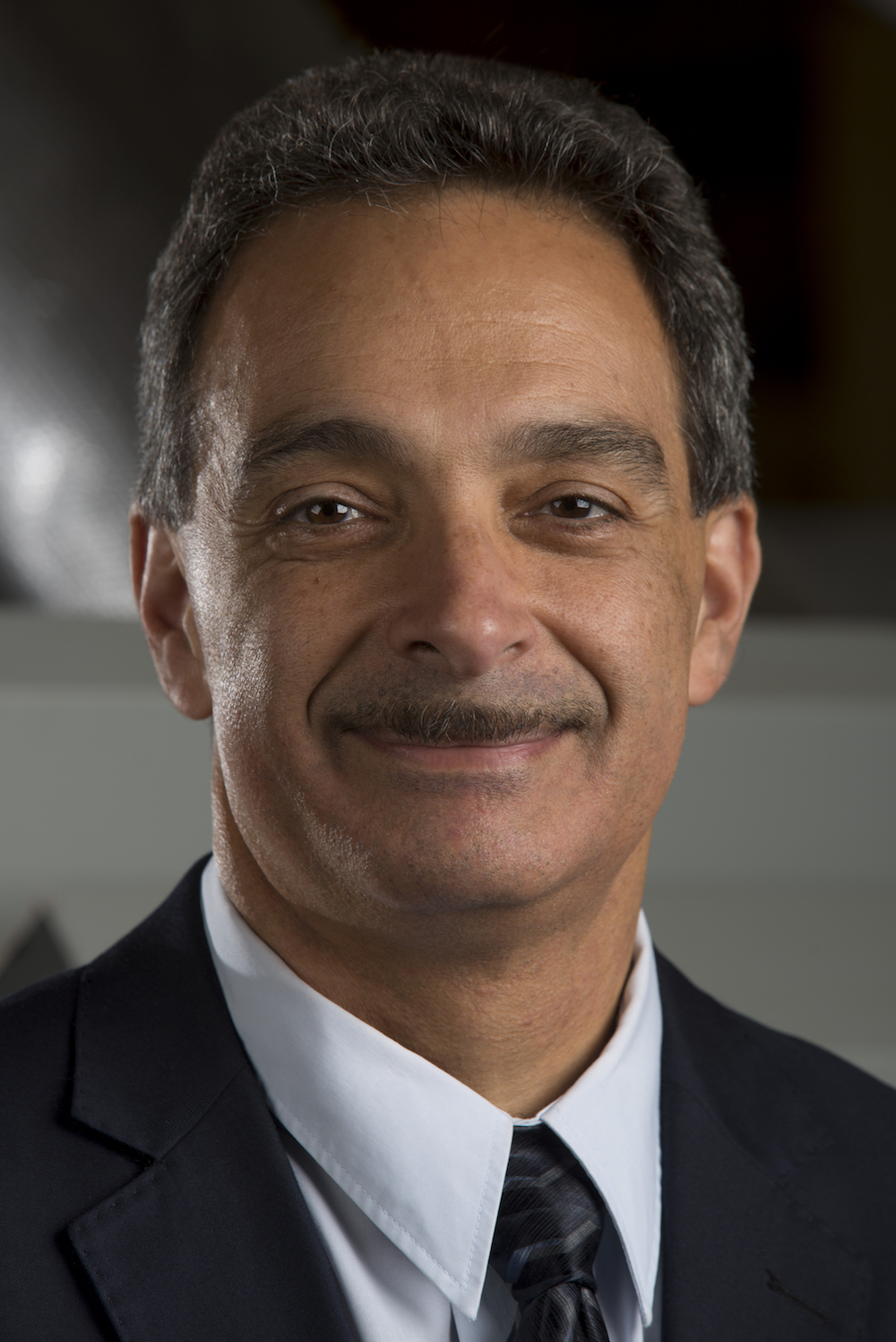
Habib Joseph Dagher is the founding executive director of the UMaine Advanced Structures and Composites Center.

Habib Dagher is the founding Executive Director of the Advanced Structures & Composites Center at the University of Maine. Dr. Dagher is an advocate for developing advanced structural systems which simultaneously optimize structures, materials, and construction.

Dagher holds 25 U.S. and international patents with 8 additional patents pending, and has received numerous awards including the 2015 White House Transportation Champion of Change, awarded for the development of composite arch bridge system technology; the Carnegie Foundation Maine Professor of the Year; the Distinguished Maine Professor Award, the highest award given to a faculty member at UMaine; and the American Society of Civil Engineers Charles Pankow Innovation Award.

Dagher earned his Ph.D. in structural engineering from the University of Wisconsin–Madison, as well as two master's degrees in structural engineering and engineering mechanics, and joined the University of Maine faculty in 1985.

== Research and Development Projects ==
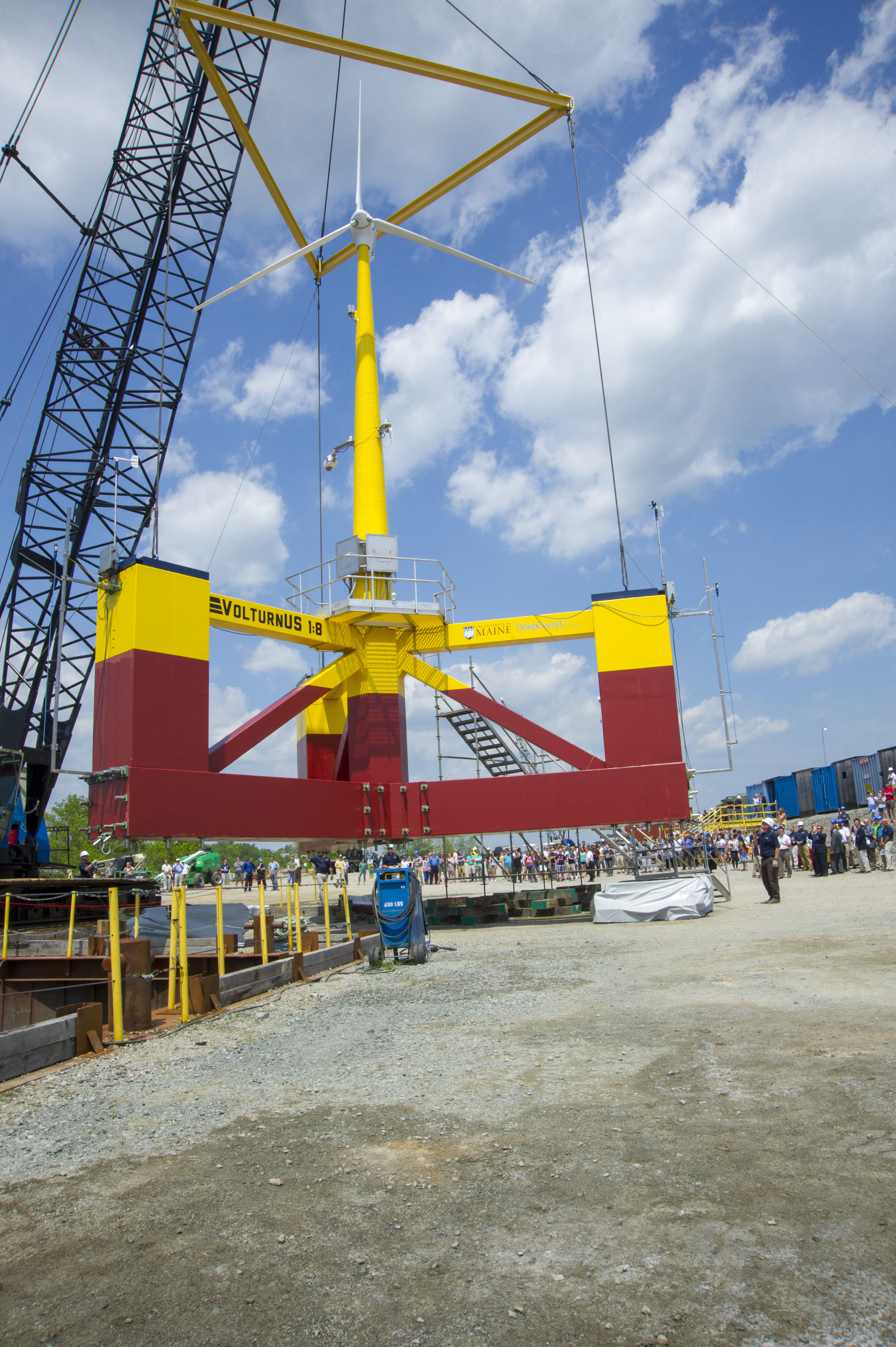
The UMaine-developed, patent-pending, VolturnUS floating concrete hull technology can support wind turbines in water depths of 45 meters or more, and has the potential to significantly reduce the cost of offshore wind.

=== VolturnUS 1:8 ===
In Summer 2013, the center deployed the first grid-connected offshore wind turbine in the United States and the only floating turbine with a concrete hull in the world. The patented VolturnUS technology is the culmination of collaborative research and development conducted by the University of Maine-led DeepCwind Consortium. VolturnUS 1:8 is a 65 feet (20 meters) tall floating turbine prototype; 1:8th the scale of a 6 megawatt (MW), 425 feet (130 meters) rotor diameter design. Funding for this research was provided by the U.S. Department of Energy, the National Science Foundation, and others.

Maine Aqua Ventus, I, GP, LLC, is pursuing a 12 MW demonstration project off the coast of Monhegan Island, ME, using the VolturnUS floating platform technology.

=== DeepCLiDAR ===
DeepCLiDAR is an advanced metocean buoy outfitted with LIDAR, created with funding from the US Department of Energy and the Maine Technology Institute. DeepCLiDAR can be used in remote marine environments to provide high quality, low-cost offshore wind resource data, metocean monitoring, and ecological characterization capabilities. It was developed in partnership with Dr. Neal Pettigrew of the UMaine Physical Oceanography Group, AWS Truepower, and NRG Renewable Systems.

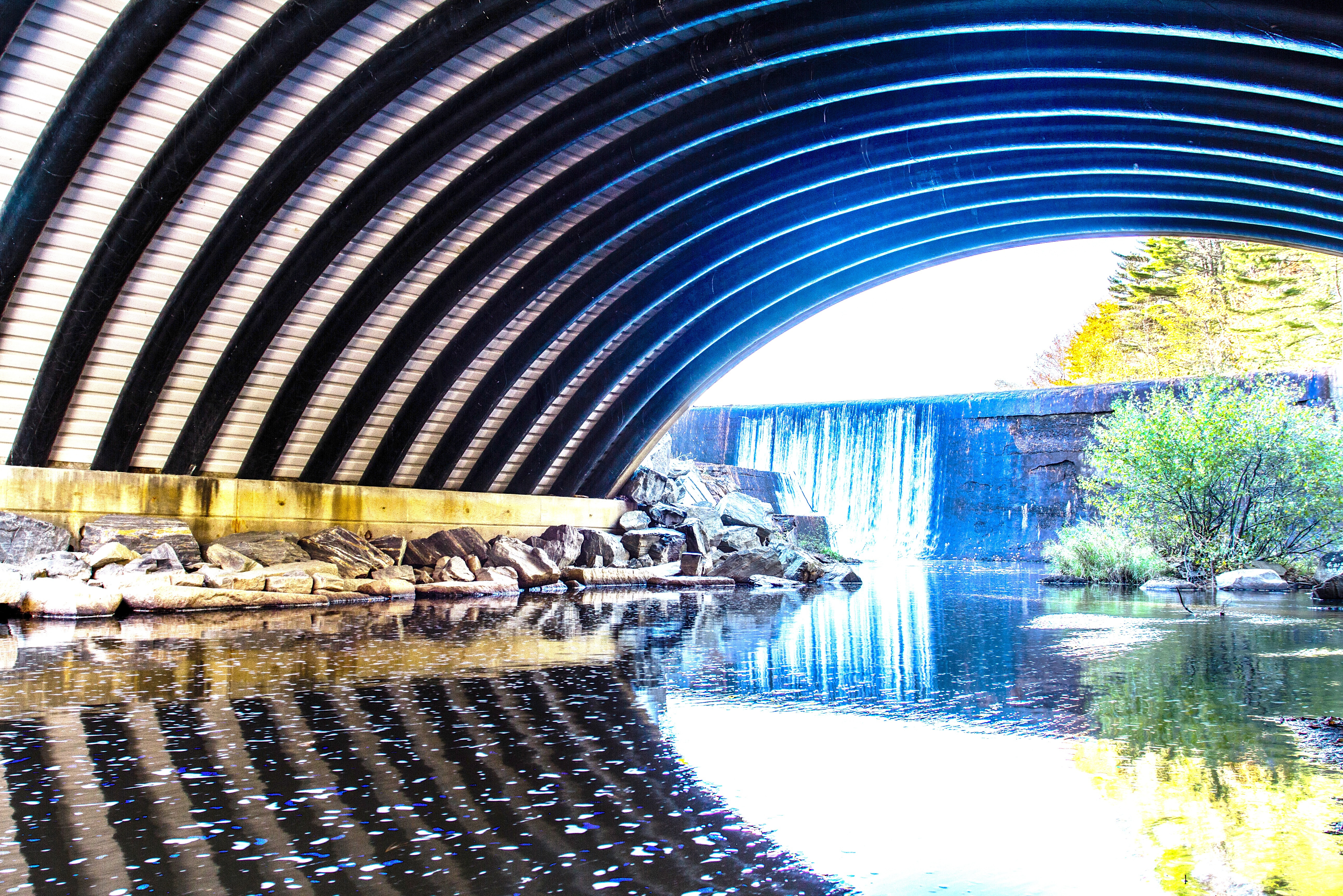
The Perkins Bridge in Belfast, ME was installed in 2010 by Advanced Infrastructure Technologies. This composite arch bridge has a 48.0’ span made up of 16 composite arches.

=== Composite Arch Bridge System ===
The Composite Arch Bridge System, commonly known as Bridge-in-a-Backpack, is a lightweight, corrosion resistant system for short to medium span bridge construction using composite arch tubes that act as reinforcement and formwork for cast-in-place concrete. The center's innovative composite bridge system is American Association of State Highway and Transportation Officials approved, lowers construction costs, extends structural lifespan up to 100 years, and is a greener alternative to concrete and steel construction. Advanced Infrastructure Technologies is a privately held company licensed by the University of Maine to produce these bridges.

In January 2017, Advanced Infrastructure Technologies signed a distribution and marketing agreement for North America with Terre Armee Group/Reinforced Earth Company, which aims to expand adoption of the composite arch bridge system technology.

=== Longest composite bridge in the world ===
Longterm durability of bridges is a major concern for transportation departments across the country. In response to this concern, the UMaine Composites Center validated a hybrid composite beam designed by HC Bridge Company, LLC, that was fabricated by Harbor Technologies in Brunswick, Maine. The hybrid composite beam, made of fiber-reinforced polymer, is lightweight, corrosion-resistant, and strong enough to be used for bridge construction. The Knickerbocker Bridge, over Back River in Boothbay, ME, is the longest composite bridge in the world at 540 feet (160 meters) long and is 32 feet (9.8 meters) wide. The bridge opened to traffic in 2011.

=== MAKO ===
Designed in partnership with Hodgdon Defense Composites and Maine Marine Manufacturing, the UMaine Composites Center performed testing on a special operations boat with a fully composite hull to replace the aluminum hull craft currently used by US Navy SEALs. This 83 feet (25 meters) long, impact-resistant prototype is the result of a $15 million research and development project that resulted in the first all-composites hull for the US Navy.

=== Secure Hybrid Composite Shipping Container ===
Funded by the Department of Homeland Security, the UMaine Composites Center developed a patent-pending shipping container that mitigates security risks associated with marine cargo. Georgia Tech Research Institute designed the security system for the container, featuring embedded sensors to detect intrusions, door opening sensors to monitor access to the container, and a communication system capable of reporting the security status from anywhere in the world. This technology is now in field trials toward commercialization.

=== Modular Ballistic Protection System (MBPS) ===
MBPS, developed in partnership with the US Army Natick Soldier RD&E Center, provides soldiers with enhanced ballistic protection in the field. The patent-pending MBPS is a quickly erectable, re-deployable, and lightweight ballistic protection system. MBPS provides ballistic protection for personnel and equipment in expeditionary base camps where mobility and rapid deployment requirements prevent the immediate use of heavyweight systems like sandbags and concrete barriers. MBPS requires no tools to up-armor a standard issue 20 by 32 feet (6.1 by 9.8 meters) tent and can be deployed in less than 30 minutes by 4 soldiers.

=== Blast Resistant Structures ===
In partnership with the US Army Corps of Engineers ERDC, the UMaine Composites Center developed blast-resistant structures with coated wood framing members, panels and subassemblies. These blast-resistant materials are economically coated to enhance the construction material's ductility and energy dissipation capacity. In addition to superior blast resistance, benefits of these structures include: cost-efficiencies, ease of assembly, environmental durability, rapid deployment, high strength to weight ratios, and protection from moisture absorption, termites, ants and biodegradation.

== Advanced Engineered Wood Composites (AEWC) Center ==
In 1996, the center was opened as the Advanced Engineered Wood Composites Center. In 2012, the organization formally underwent a name change as approved by the University of Maine System Board of Trustees to the Advanced Structures and Composites Center. This name change was a reflection of research foci expanded beyond wood composites to include other areas such as: ocean energy, defense and aerospace composites, civil infrastructure, and nanocomposites.

== Notable Awards ==
=== 2000 - 2015 ===
On October 13, 2015, Dr. Habib Dagher, founding Director of the University of Maine's Advanced Structures and Composites Center, was recognized as a "2015 White House Transportation Champion of Change." Dr. Dagher is the primary inventor of the composite arch bridge system.

American Society of Civil Engineers Pankow Award for Innovation, presented to the Advanced Structures and Composites Center for its development of Bridge-in-a-Backpack, March 31, 2011.

American Composites Manufacturers Association, Most Creative Product Award to the Advanced Structures and Composites Center's Bridge-in-a-Backpack™, February 2010.

American Composites Manufacturers Association, Most Creative Product to the Advanced Structures and Composites Center's blast resistant panels, January 16, 2009.

American Composites Manufacturers Association (ACMA) People's Choice Award for exhibiting the highest degree of design, innovation, creativity and the best use of composite materials to Modular Ballistic Protection System. Oct 15, 2007.

American Composites Manufacturers Association (ACMA) Best of Show Award, recognized as the highest composites industry award, for being the year's finest product, to Modular Ballistic Protection System. Oct 15, 2007.
