= UMaine Deepwater Offshore Wind Test Site =

UMaine Deepwater Offshore Wind Test Site (Maine)

The University of Maine (UMaine) Deepwater Offshore Wind Test Site, located nearly 3 miles south west of Monhegan Island, Maine is available for use by commercial and non-commercial entities in partnership with the University of Maine, or the University of Maine itself, to research and develop ocean energy devices, such as floating wind turbines or wave energy converters.

The University of Maine asserts that the test site is among the most extensively studied in the Gulf of Maine.

The site was established under Maine law in 2009. The legislation formally designates the test site as the "Maine Offshore Wind Energy Research Center."

Maine Aqua Ventus I, GP, LLC, is pursuing a 12 MW demonstration offshore wind pilot project in the test site, with deployment and commercial operations planned for 2020.

== Allowable uses ==
The following research and development efforts are allowable in the UMaine Deepwater Offshore Wind Test Site, per LD 1465:

1. A wind energy development project that uses a wind turbine to convert wind energy into electrical energy with no more than 2 wind energy turbines.
2. Up to 3 meteorological towers per wind turbine.
3. One submerged utility line with maximum capacity of 25 megawatts.
4. Up to 2 wave energy converters, which use the motion of the ocean surface waves to generate electricity.
5. An ocean sensor package, which refers to an instrument that would measure metocean data at the site.

There are no enhanced limitations placed on traditional commercial or recreational uses within the test site.

== Environmental and ecological surveys completed at the site ==
The University of Maine and its partners conducted a variety of ecological and environmental studies to characterize the UMaine Deepwater Offshore Wind Test Site, primarily between 2010 and 2013. Studies include baseline data on benthic invertebrates, marine mammals, birds, fish, and others.

Survey results were published in 2011 in a University of Maine-published report, entitled: "Maine Offshore Wind Report." The report was funded by the U.S. Department of Energy, National Science Foundation, Rockefeller Brothers Fund, and others.

=== NERACOOS buoy data ===
Hourly buoy data near the UMaine Deepwater Offshore Wind Test Site is available viewing and download from the Northeastern Regional Association of Coastal Ocean Observing Systems (NERACOOS) buoy E01. Available real-time weather and ocean data includes winds, waves, visibility, air temperature, and water temperature at the UMaine Deepwater Offshore Wind Test Site.

This University of Maine graphic shows the location and proximity of the UMaine Deepwater Offshore Wind Test Site with respect to Monhegan Island.

== Site selection ==
The UMaine Deepwater Offshore Wind Test Site was designated to the University of Maine by the 124th Legislature of the State of Maine in 2009. As a result of recommendations from Governor John E. Baldacci's Ocean Energy Task Force, the Maine Department of Conservation identified three locations off the coast of Maine as Wind Energy Test Areas. The sites were chosen following a public outreach process led by the Maine State Planning Office in cooperation with the Maine State Planning Office, Department of Environmental Protection, Department of Marine Resources, and the University of Maine. In December 2009, the Maine Department of Conservation designated the location off of Monhegan Island based on its distance from the mainland shore and greater water depths.

=== Site Selection Methodology ===
In September 2009, the Maine Department of Conservation released a document regarding the Maine Offshore Energy Demonstration Area Siting Initiative, which worked to establish several areas within Maine state waters that would be technically appropriate for an offshore wind demonstration area. The document stated that demonstration areas would be identified as a "three pronged approach," that would consider: geographical information system "showstoppers," human use and activities, and environmental considerations.

Further, the document states: "Through a combination of anthropogenic, environmental, and geophysical analyses, the State of Maine hopes to site these ocean energy testing and demonstration projects in areas with the fewest conflicts, or at the very least, minimize what conflicts there will be. Adaptive Management will play a critical role in the duration of a project, or may affect how the project operates, once it is built."

In October 2009, the Maine Department of Conservation and Maine State Planning Office released a document that detailed site selection methodology for the Maine Offshore Energy Demonstration Area Siting Initiative.

The document outlines two phases. The first phrase focused on technical identification, public scoping sessions, and state consultation with state agencies. The second phase focused on map analysis (of ecological concerns, geology, obstructions, infrastructure, human uses of the marine environment, and viewshed) followed by a ranking process that gathered written and oral comments from a variety of sources, including fishermen, state agencies, and other interested parties.

Matthew Nixon of the Maine State Planning Office provided a culminating presentation at a "Developer's Summit," sponsored by the University of Maine in February 2011, describing the technical identification process and more than 40 public scoping sessions held in 2009.

== Proposed projects ==
Maine Aqua Ventus I, GP, LLC, is pursuing a 12 MW demonstration project in the test site. The project would feature two 6 MW wind turbines mounted on a University of Maine-developed VolturnUS floating concrete hull.

Sections of the VolturnUS will be fabricated in Hampden, Maine, and Searsport, Maine, and towed to the test site. An AC cable will join the turbines, and a subsea power cable will connect the test site to a point onshore. The project has a planned 20-year duration, as indicated in the project's Power Purchase Agreement draft term sheet with the Maine Public Utilities Commission.

Project participants include Emera, Inc., Cianbro Corporation, DCNS, and the University of Maine. Deployment and commercial operation of the two units is currently planned for 2019.

== Reception by Monhegan Island ==
Monhegan Island is located 12 nautical miles off the mainland. The population was 75 at the 2000 census. Monhegan Plantation created and authorized the Monhegan Energy Task Force to, "represent Monhegan in communications and negotiations with Maine Aqua Ventus regarding all aspects of the proposed offshore wind project, including the planning construction, operation, and decommissioning phases."

As part of their proposed contract with the Maine Public Utilities Commission through a Power Purchase Agreement, Maine Aqua Ventus has an obligation to provide local benefit to Monhegan through a subsea cable interconnection with Central Maine Power or an alternative negotiated benefit. As of November 1, 2016, the Monhegan Energy Task Force contracted with law firm Eaton Peabody to negotiate the community benefits agreement with Maine Aqua Ventus.

The test site and proposed project has created ongoing discussion on the Island, with residents considering potential impacts to their community.

=== Community response ===
In early July 2016, the Monhegan Energy Task Force conducted a survey to gauge community interest and sentiment towards Maine Aqua Ventus and the proposed offshore wind demonstration project. The survey broke results down between all respondents (registered voter, property owner, year-round resident, or seasonal worker) and exclusively Monhegan registered voters. The survey found that respondents were more supportive of the project (43.7%) versus opposed (40.2%) with a small percentage of undecided (16%). This support was found to be stronger among Monhegan Registered Voters.

The same survey asked if Monhegan Plantation should cease to engage with Maine Aqua Ventus overall. The Monhegan Energy Task Force reported that nearly 80% of Registered Voters should engage with Maine Aqua Ventus and pursue a community benefit agreement.

In late July 2016, Monhegan Plantation held a special town meeting to see if the plantation to pursue development of a community benefits agreement with Maine Aqua Ventus. This vote passed with 31 to 1 registered voters in favor.

A group called "Protect Monhegan," formed in November 2016, led by Monhegan resident Travis Dow, to express opposition to the Maine Aqua Ventus project.

On February 8, 2017, Maine State Senator Dana Dow (R-Damariscotta) issued a statement suggesting he would introduce a bill on behalf of "Protect Monhegan," to prohibit a wind energy test area within 10 miles of Monhegan Island's lobster conservation area. Formal bill language was not issued with the Senator's statement, made through the State's Republican party website.

On February 7, 2017, during a briefing of the State's joint legislative committee on Energy, Utilities, and Technology (EUT Committee), Dr. Habib Dagher of the University of Maine asserted that moving the test site would "kill the project."

The EUT committee voted Ought Not to Pass Pursuant To Joint Rule 310, May 23, 2017.

== See also ==
- DeepCwind Consortium
- VolturnUS
- Wind Power in Maine
