= Fox Islands Electric Cooperative =

Electricity provider in Maine, U.S.

Coordinates: 44°3′1.92″N 68°50′30.1″W

- Company type: Utility cooperative
- Industry: Wind energy
- Founded: 1974
- Headquarters: Vinalhaven, Maine, U.S.
- Key people: L. Patrick Trainor, President; Amy M. Watson, CEO
- Website: foxislands.ne

Fox Islands Electric Cooperative is a utility cooperative based in Vinalhaven, Maine. The cooperative provides electricity for the residents of Penobscot Bay islands North Haven and Vinalhaven. Vinalhaven is home to the Fox Islands Wind Project's three 1.5 MW turbines, which provide electricity for both islands and compose the largest community wind energy facility on the East Coast of the United States.

== History ==
Vinalhaven Light & Power Company provided electricity for the islands for much of the 20th century. Power for the residents was produced through diesel generators. During a special town meeting in October 1974, the residents voted to organize a cooperative by an 80% majority. The cooperative bought Vinalhaven Light & Power from owner Herb Peterson. Grant Duell was elected president of the cooperative. Two years after the foundation, the cooperative laid a 10-mile submarine power cable with the support of a loan from the Rural Electrification Administration. The cable connected North Haven to Central Maine Power Company’s lines on the mainland in Rockport. The cable was put into use in 1977 despite protests by scallop fishermen.

The undersea cable became increasingly unreliable over the decades and was replaced in May 2005. Funding for the new cable was provided through a loan and grant from the US Rural Utilities Service and provided an infrastructure whereby power could be exported back to the mainland as well as imported to the islands.

== Fox Islands Wind Project ==
In 2001, board members and staff of the Fox Islands Electric Cooperative started exploring the feasibility of wind power on the islands. The cooperative received a grant for a three-year wind energy study conducted the following year. The study was conducted by the University of Massachusetts Amherst Renewable Energy Research Laboratory.

Initially, the project suffered from a lack of community interest. Following Hurricane Katrina in 2005, however, natural gas prices spiked and caused a massive increase in island electricity bills. Community meetings were convened in the spring of 2008 to discuss the proposed wind project. A preliminary economic analysis was conducted for the cooperative in 2008 with the help of the non-profit Island Institute. The institute also provided half of the funding necessary to conduct an environmental study on avian impacts, a visual impact simulation, and a logistical feasibility analysis. A detailed economic analysis of the project suggested that electricity rates could be lowered by 2 to 4 cents per kilowatt hour for the first 10 years and twice that amount in the following 10 years. Fox Islands Electric Cooperative members demonstrated overwhelming support for the project, voting 383 to 5 in favor on July 28, 2008. Funding for the three 1.5 MW turbines was projected to cost the cooperative $12–14 million. The cooperative secured a $9.5 million loan from the Rural Utilities Service of the USDA. Fox Islands Electric Cooperative also created Fox Islands Wind LLC, a separate for-profit corporation that could take advantage of tax credits. Dr. George Baker was selected as CEO of the company, which secured a commitment from Diversified Communications of Portland, Maine to purchase the tax credits for $5 million.

Construction began in the summer of 2009 and culminated that November with a dedication by Maine governor John Baldacci and Maine House Speaker and North Haven resident Hannah Pingree. The three wind turbines are expected to generate 11,605 megawatt hours of electricity per year, more power than is needed by the islands. The wind project has provided lower energy costs for residents of the islands, who were paying more than twice the national average for their electricity.

After receiving multiple complaints from Vinalhaven residents about the noise generated by the turbines, the cooperative ran an experiment in sound reduction. There is also concern that the wind turbines are a threat to bald eagles nesting in the vicinity.

== See also ==
- Wind Power in Maine
- Community wind energy
