= Hirundo Wildlife Refuge =

Wildlife refuge in Maine, US

- IUCN category IV (habitat/species management area)
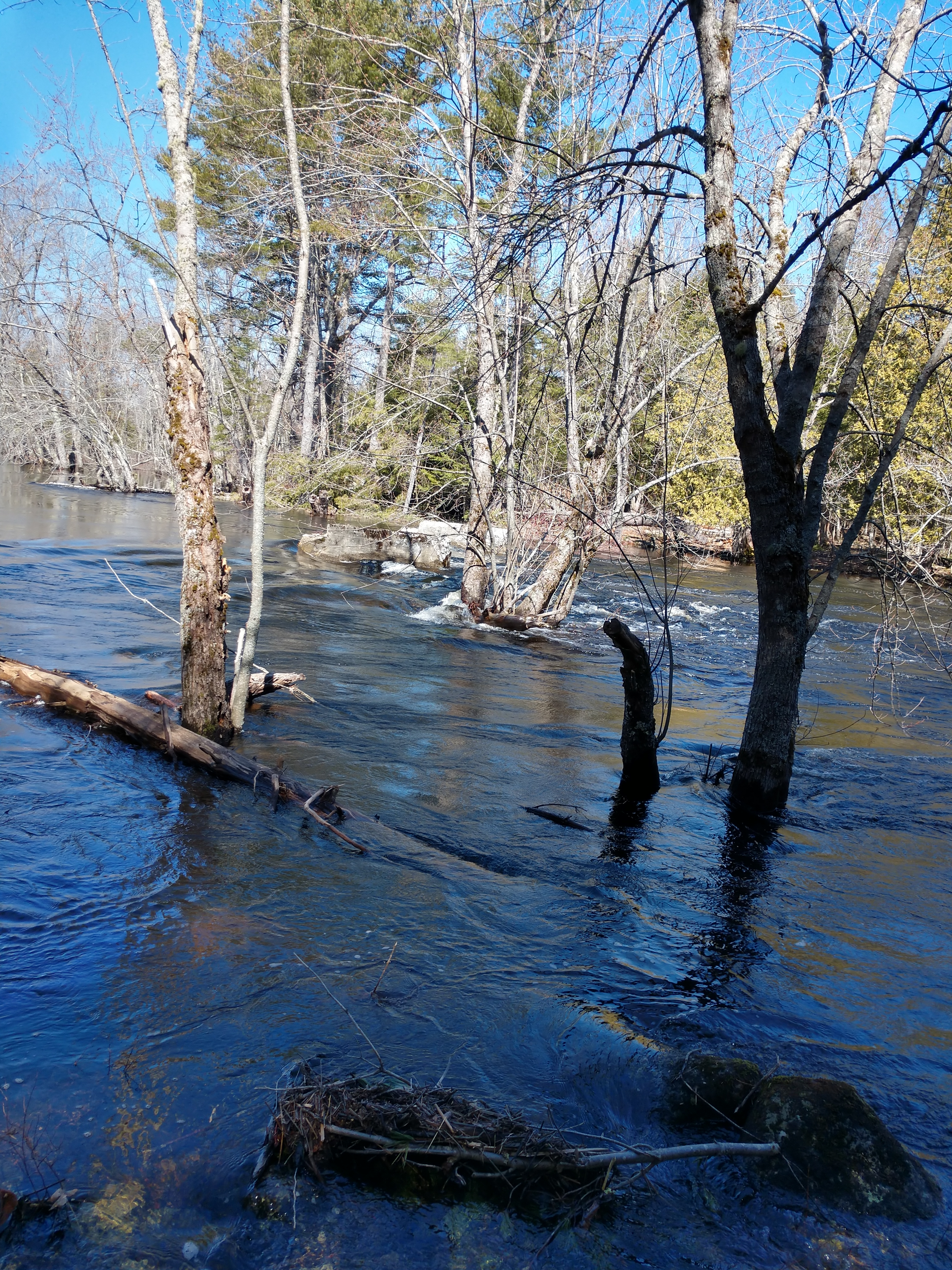
- The Pushaw Stream in Hirundo Wildlife Refuge in April 2018.

- Location within Maine
- Location: Penobscot County, Maine, United States
- Nearest city: Old Town, ME
- Coordinates: 44.98718°N 68.78533°W
- Area: 2,402 acres (972 ha)
- Established: 1965
- Governing body: University of Maine
- Website: www.hirundomaine.org

Hirundo Wildlife Refuge is a wildlife refuge covering 2,402 acres (972 ha) along Pushaw and Dead streams in Old Town, in Penobscot County, Maine. The refuge was founded in 1965 by Oliver Larouche from his parents' 3 acres (1.2 ha) camp. The refuge was donated as a trust to the University of Maine in 1983 by Larouche and his wife, June. The refuge is a living laboratory where current and past scientific research has been conducted. Hirundo is just downstream of Pushaw Lake and includes part of the Caribou Bog wetland complex, which is one of the largest wetlands in Maine. The refuge is also the site of the National Register-listed Hirundo Site, a prehistoric Native American habitation site with evidence of 4,500 years of occupation.

== Recreation ==
The refuge is open to the public daily from 9:00 am until sunset, and there is no fee for admission. There are opportunities for canoeing, geocaching, and photography in the refuge. There are 7 miles (11 km) of hiking trails, including three interpretive trails with self-guiding brochures. Snowshoeing and cross-country skiing are permitted in winter. Hunting, trapping, smoking, fires, pets, bicycles, motorized vehicles, digging, and picking plants or rocks are not permitted.

== Archaeology ==
The Hirundo archaeological site is one of the first places in eastern Maine that provided evidence of human habitation during the so-called Vergennes Phase (c. 3000 BCE), although this identification was tenuous because of the weakly stratified nature of the site. The site was discovered by amateurs in 1971, and first professionally excavated in 1972–75. Finds at the site included stone projectile points and tools, including plummets (weights) probably used for fishing. The site was listed on the National Register of Historic Places in 1975.

== See also ==
- National Register of Historic Places listings in Penobscot County, Maine
- Wabanaki Confederacy
- Wetland conservation in the United States
