= Stetson Mountain =

Mountain in Maine, United States

- Location within Maine

Highest point
- Elevation: 1,085 ft (331 m)
- Prominence: 590 ft (180 m)
- Isolation: 9.46 mi (15.22 km) to Brown's Hill
- Coordinates: 45°31′34″N 67°58′35″W

Dimensions
- Length: 8 mi (13 km)

Geography
- Location: Washington County, Maine, U.S.
- Topo map: USGS Stetson Mountain

Climbing
- Easiest route: Hiking, class 1

Stetson Mountain is a small mountain located in Washington County, Maine; a 8-mile (13 km) long ridge running roughly north–south. The summit elevation is between 1,080 ft (330 m) and 1,090 ft (330 m). Stetson is approximately 10 miles (16 km) from the Canada–United States border with New Brunswick.

Stetson Mountain stands within the watershed of the Mattawamkeag River, which drains into the Penobscot River, and into Penobscot Bay. Much of the west side of Stetson Mtn. drains into Meadow Brook, thence into the Mattawamkeag River. Both sides of the southern end of Stetson Mountain drain into Baskahegan Stream, thence into the Mattawamkeag River. Both sides of the northern end and most of the east side of Stetson Mountain drain into Hot Brook, thence into Baskahegan Stream.

== Stetson Wind Farm ==
In January 2008, First Wind (then UPC Wind) received the approval of the Maine Land Use Regulation Commission (LURC) for its Stetson Wind Farm. The 57 megawatt wind farm began commercial operations in January 2009. It consists of 38 General Electric 1.5-MW wind turbines, and is expected to generate approximately 167 million kilowatt-hours (kW·h) of electricity per year. As of 2009, Stetson Wind is the largest wind energy project in operation in New England, surpassing the Mars Hill Wind Farm.

In March 2009, the LURC approved First Wind's $60 million 25.5 MW Stetson II project. The 17 turbines will be installed on nearby Jimmy (45°37′48″N 67°58′47″W) and Owl (45°35′34″N 67°57′34″W) mountains.

== See also ==
- List of mountains in Maine
- Wind power in Maine
