= DeepCwind Consortium =

DeepCwind Consortium logo

The DeepCwind Consortium was a national consortium of universities, nonprofits, utilities, and industry leaders. The mission of the consortium was to establish the State of Maine as a national leader in floating offshore wind technology. Much of the consortium's work and resulting research was funded by the U.S. Department of Energy, the National Science Foundations, and others.

The efforts of the DeepCwind Consortium culminated in the University of Maine patent-pending VolturnUS, a floating concrete hull technology can support wind turbines in water depths of 45 meters or more, and has the potential to significantly reduce the cost of offshore wind.

== Overview ==
The DeepCwind Consortium was initially funded in 2009 as part of the American Recovery and Reinvestment Act (ARRA) through the U.S. Department of Energy. The University of Maine received $7.1 million to found the consortium and design and deploy floating offshore turbine prototypes. As part of this funding, the research plan included: "optimization of designs for floating platforms by evaluating options for using more durable, lighter, hybrid composite materials, manufacturability, and deployment logistics."

Floating deepwater wind farms placed ten or more nautical miles (nmi) offshore can play a critical role in reaching the Department of Energy's 20% windpower goal by 2030. Deepwater offshore wind is the dominant U.S. ocean energy resource, representing a potential of nearly 3,100 TW-h/year. It also:

- Overcomes viewshed issues that have delayed or prevented some nearshore projects.
- Places energy generation closer to major U.S. population centers.
- Allows access to a more powerful Class 6 and 7 wind resource.
- Reduces over time wind energy costs by reducing transmission costs from remote land sites and by simplifying deployment and maintenance logistics.

With these qualities in mind, Maine planned to construct a 5 GW, $20 billion network of floating offshore wind farms to contribute to the northeast U.S. renewable energy needs. Maine has the deepest waters near its shores, approximately 200 ft deep at 3 nmi, and 89% of Maine's 156 GW offshore wind resource is in deep waters. The state also offers extensive maritime industry infrastructure and proximity to one of the largest energy markets in the country.

== Research Outcomes ==
The DeepCwind Consortium published the Maine Offshore Wind Report in February 2011. The report "examines economics and policy, electrical grid integration, wind and wave, bathymetric, soil, and environmental research. It also includes summaries of assembly and construction sites, critical issues for project development and permitting, and an analysis of the implications of the Jones Act."

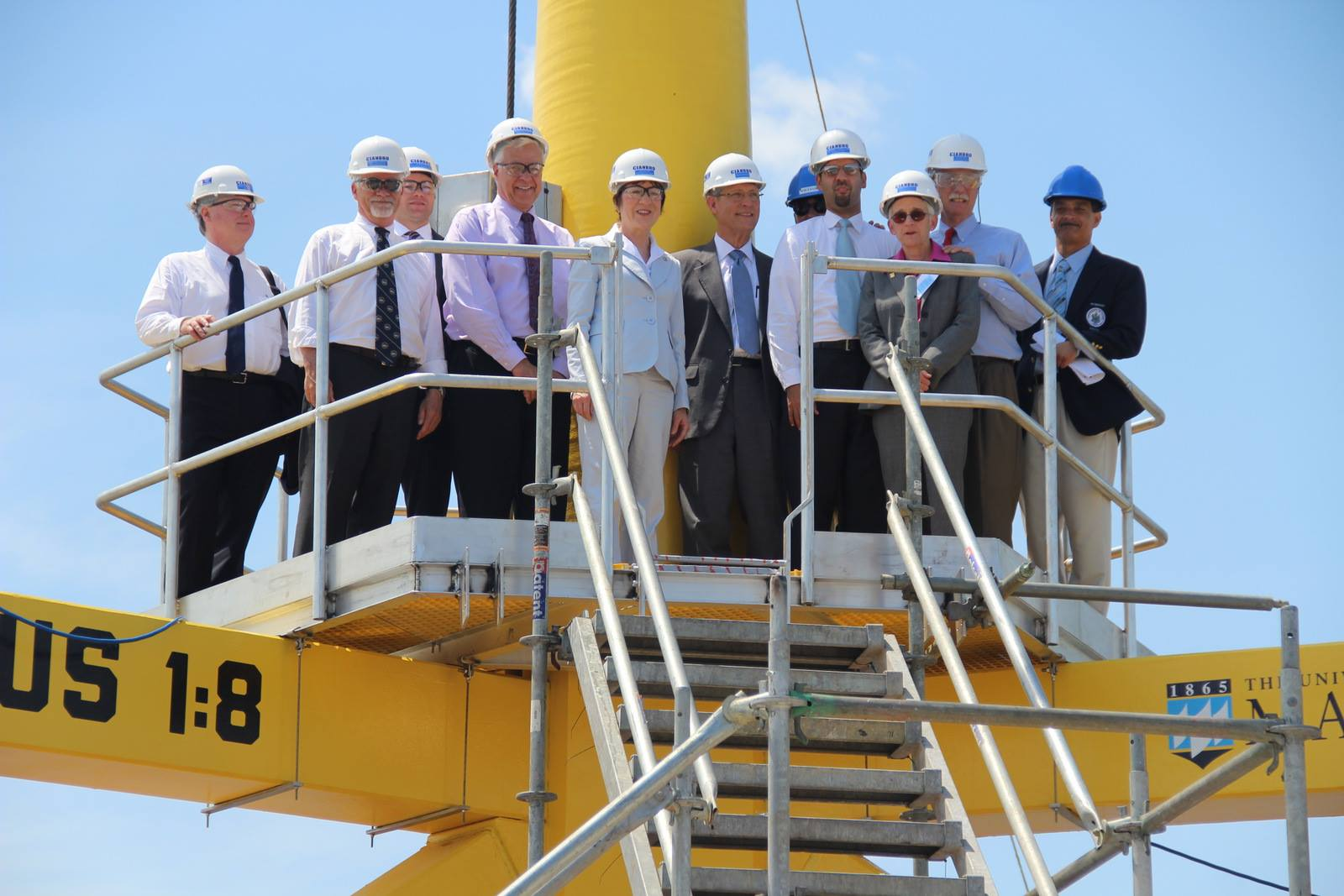
The VolturnUS was launched from Cianbro's Brewer, ME facility on May 31, 2013. Pictured left to right: University of Maine System Chancellor James Page, Maine Maritime Academy President William Brennan, Patrick Woodcock, Congressman Michael Michaud, Senator Susan Collins, Peter Vigue, Jose Zayas, Program Manager of the U.S. Department of Energy's Wind and Water Power Program, University of Maine President Susan Hunter, Senator Angus King, and Dr. Habib Dagher, Director of the UMaine Composites Center.

In June 2013, the consortium deployed the 20 kW VolturnUS 1:8, a 65-foot-tall floating turbine prototype that is 1:8th the scale of a 6-megawatt (MW), 450-foot rotor diameter design. VolturnUS 1:8 was the first grid-connected offshore wind turbine in the Americas.

In June 2016, the UMaine-led New England Aqua Ventus I project has just won top tier status from the US Department of Energy (DOE) Advanced Technology Demonstration Program for Offshore Wind. New England Aqua Ventus I is a two 6 MW turbine (12 MW) floating offshore wind pilot project 14 miles off Maine's coast, developed by Maine Aqua Ventus, GP, LLC. The objective of the pilot is to demonstrate the technology at full scale, allowing floating farms to be built out-of-sight across the US and the world in the 2020s, bringing lower-cost, clean renewable energy to coastal population centers.

== Partnering Organizations and Original Research Initiatives ==
The University of Maine-led consortium includes universities, nonprofits, and utilities; a wide range of industry leaders in offshore design, offshore construction, and marine structures manufacturing; firms with expertise in wind project siting, environmental analysis, environmental law, composites materials to assist in corrosion-resistant material design and selection, and energy investment; and industry organizations to assist with education and tech transfer activities.

=== Task 1: Micrositing, Geophysical Investigations, and Geotechnical Engineering ===
The primary objective of micrositing, geophysical investigations, and geotechnical engineering was the characterization of the seafloor environment for turbine anchoring at the University of Maine Deepwater Offshore Wind Test Site in the Gulf of Maine. Activities coordinated geologic and geotechnical engineering information with the metocean forces assessed in the Offshore Turbine Testing, Monitoring, and Reliability task and assisted in design of efficient moorings and anchors for the floating offshore wind turbines under the Floating Turbines Design and Lab Testing task. An additional objective of this task was to provide site location documentation and address safety and navigation at the site once the turbines and moorings are installed.

Partners: University of Maine Department of Civil and Environmental Engineering, James W. Sewall Company, Maine Maritime Academy, University of Western Australia Centre for Offshore Foundation Research

=== Task 2: Study of Environmental/Ecological Impacts ===
Maine Public Law 270, which allowed the establishment of the University of Maine Deepwater Offshore Wind Test Site, required that the following state and federal agencies be consulted concerning environmental monitoring and planning of the test site:

- Department of Inland Fisheries and Wildlife
- Department of Marine Resources
- Department of Conservation
- Coast Guard
- Army Corps of Engineers
- NOAA Fisheries

These agencies required plans for siting, navigation, project removal, remedial action, and environmental/ecological monitoring. They also required reports and updates on site activities.

- Micrositing and geophysical investigations activities
- Bathymetric surveys
- Survey to check for presence of historically significant resources
- Site plan creation
- Navigation and safety plan creation
- Environmental/ecological monitoring activities

There were to be wildlife-specific studies for:

- Benthic Invertebrates
- Fish
- Marine mammals
- Birds and bats
- No live animals will be collected for the environmental monitoring efforts.

As part of the environmental/ecological monitoring plan that was part of the test site permit application, a review of the potential threats to marine life was considered and mitigation measures were designed. Potential areas of concern addressed in this report included the following:

- Entanglement of marine mammals in mooring lines and structures.
- Disturbance of migration and feeding areas.
- Bird and bat strikes.
- Attraction of fish or marine mammals to the platforms.
- Interruption of wave energy direction and focus.
- Human impacts.
- Visual impacts.
- Potential disturbance of historical or culturally significant areas.

All micrositing, environmental/ecological monitoring, and permitting activities were conducted from the start of the project in 2010 until the end of the project in 2012.

Partners: University of Maine School of Marine Sciences, University of Maine School of Biology and Ecology, Island Institute, Gulf of Maine Research Institute, New Jersey Audubon Society, Pacific Northwest National Laboratory

=== Task 3: Permitting and Policy ===
Under the recently enacted Maine Public Law 2009, Chapter 270 (LD 1465), the University of Maine Deepwater Offshore Wind Test Site is located near Monhegan Island, an area selected by the state. This site was analyzed in detail through the state's site selection process.

With Maine's designation of the test site, the Permitting and Policy team secured specific permits for the proposed project from all applicable local, state, and federal permitting authorities. In conformance with the application requirements, to obtain a General Permit under LD 1465, the Permitting and Policy team, in conjunction with the Micrositing and Ecological Monitoring teams, submitted a report to the required state and federal agencies describing:

- Existing commercial fishing and other uses in the project area, as well as the marine resources.
- A detailed monitoring plan of benthic invertebrates, fish, marine mammal, and avian wildlife.
- Monitoring plan of ambient noise levels possibly associated with project construction and, if needed, any subsequent operations and avoidance and mitigation measures.
- Navigation public safety plans.
- Project removal plan.

The team worked to develop these plans in consultation with federal, state, and local agencies, as well as stakeholders.

Partners: James W. Sewall Company, Kleinschmidt, HDR/DTA

=== Task 4: Floating Turbine Design, Material Selection, and Lab Testing ===
The primary objectives of the Floating Turbine Design task was to:

- Partially validate the coupled aeroelastic/hydrodynamic models developed by NREL.
- Optimize platform designs by integrating more durable, lighter, hybrid composite materials.
- Develop a complete design of one or more scale floating turbine platforms, capable of supporting a wind turbine in the 10 kW to 250 kW range for deployment at the University of Maine Deepwater Offshore Wind Test Site.

Partners: Advanced Structures and Composites Center, Maine Maritime Academy, Technip USA, National Renewable Energy Laboratory, Sandia National Labs, Ashland, Inc., Kenway Corporation, Harbor Technologies, PPG Industries, Owens Corning, Zoltek, Polystrand, Inc.

=== Task 5: Offshore Turbine Testing, Monitoring, and Reliability ===
The Physical Oceanography Group (PhOG) at the University of Maine deployed and operated an oceanographic data buoy with real-time telemetry capabilities in the University of Maine Deepwater Offshore Wind Test Site offshore Monhegan Island. The ocean data buoy was deployed prior to the tank testing and remained in operation throughout the project period in order to monitor oceanographic, meteorological, and general environmental conditions. Monitoring emphasis was on wind speed and direction, visibility, directional waves, and water-column currents.

Partners: University of Maine Physical Oceanography Group, University of Maine School of Marine Sciences

=== Task 6: Education and Outreach ===
The University of Maine, Maine Maritime Academy, and Northern Maine Community College developed several degree programs to create a trained workforce for the State of Maine. To ensure the community at large understands our research and development, the DeepCwind Consortium found numerous opportunities to share and discuss goals, activity plans, and the results of research. The consortium held public meetings to discuss the site selection for the University of Maine Deepwater Offshore Wind Test Site, presented at conferences within the state and across the country, and even taught an interactive wind-wave tank testing activity to over 500 K-12 students across Maine. These and other activities continued through the duration of the project.

Partners: Advanced Structures and Composites Center, University of Maine College of Engineering, University of Maine Department of Industrial Cooperation, Maine Maritime Academy, Northern Maine Community College, American Composites Manufacturers Association, Maine Composites Alliance, Maine Wind Industry Initiative

Task 8: Fabrication and Deployment UMaine and its subcontractors led the fabrication and deployment of the approximately 1/8 scale floating wind turbine platform. The deployment study sought to identify key deployment and installation factors. The performance data gathered from the 1/8 scale platform was used to further validate platform numerical models developed by NREL and others.

Partners: Advanced Structures and Composites Center, Cianbro Corporation, General Dynamics Bath Iron Works, Maine Maritime Academy, Emera Maine, Central Maine Power Company, Technip USA, Reed and Reed, SGC

== See also ==
- Wind power in Maine
- UMaine Deepwater Offshore Wind Test Site
- VolturnUS
