= Wind power in Maine =

Electricity from wind in one U.S. state

Wind farms in Maine
Operating
Under construction
Proposed

There are a number of wind power projects in the state of Maine, totaling more than 900 megawatts (MW) in capacity. In 2020 they were responsible for 24% of in-state electricity production. In 2019, Maine had more wind capacity than the other five New England states combined, at 923 MW.

The largest wind farm is the Bingham Wind Farm in Kingsbury Plantation, with an installed capacity of 185 MW.

== Overview ==
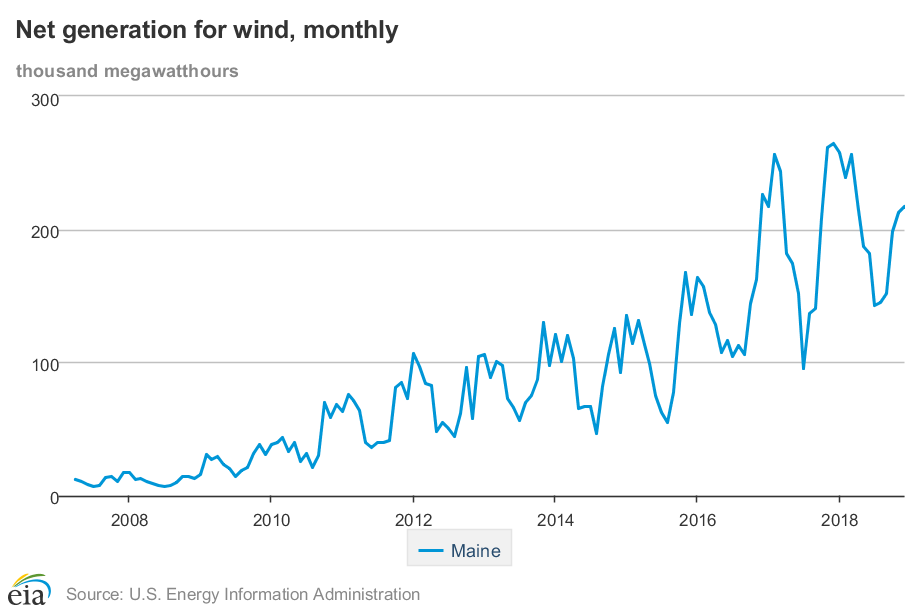
Net wind generation for the State of Maine, 2007–2018

Maine wind generation capacity by year
Megawatts of wind capacity

In 2008, then-Governor John Baldacci set a goal for the state of 2,000 megawatts of wind power installed by 2015 and 3,000 MW by 2020. Since 2007, wind power generation has increased more than 16 times, from 99 GWh generated for 2007 to 1623 GWh for 2016.

As of the end of 2016, 901 megawatts of wind generation capacity had been installed in Maine and generated nearly 14% of the state's total electricity.

In January 2018, Gov. Paul LePage created a moratorium on all new wind power construction stating, “While out-of-state interests are eager to exploit our western mountains in order to serve their political agendas, we must act judiciously to protect our natural beauty." Gov. Janet Mills ended the moratorium in February 2019 after she was elected governor.

== Operating wind farms ==
=== Mars Hill ===
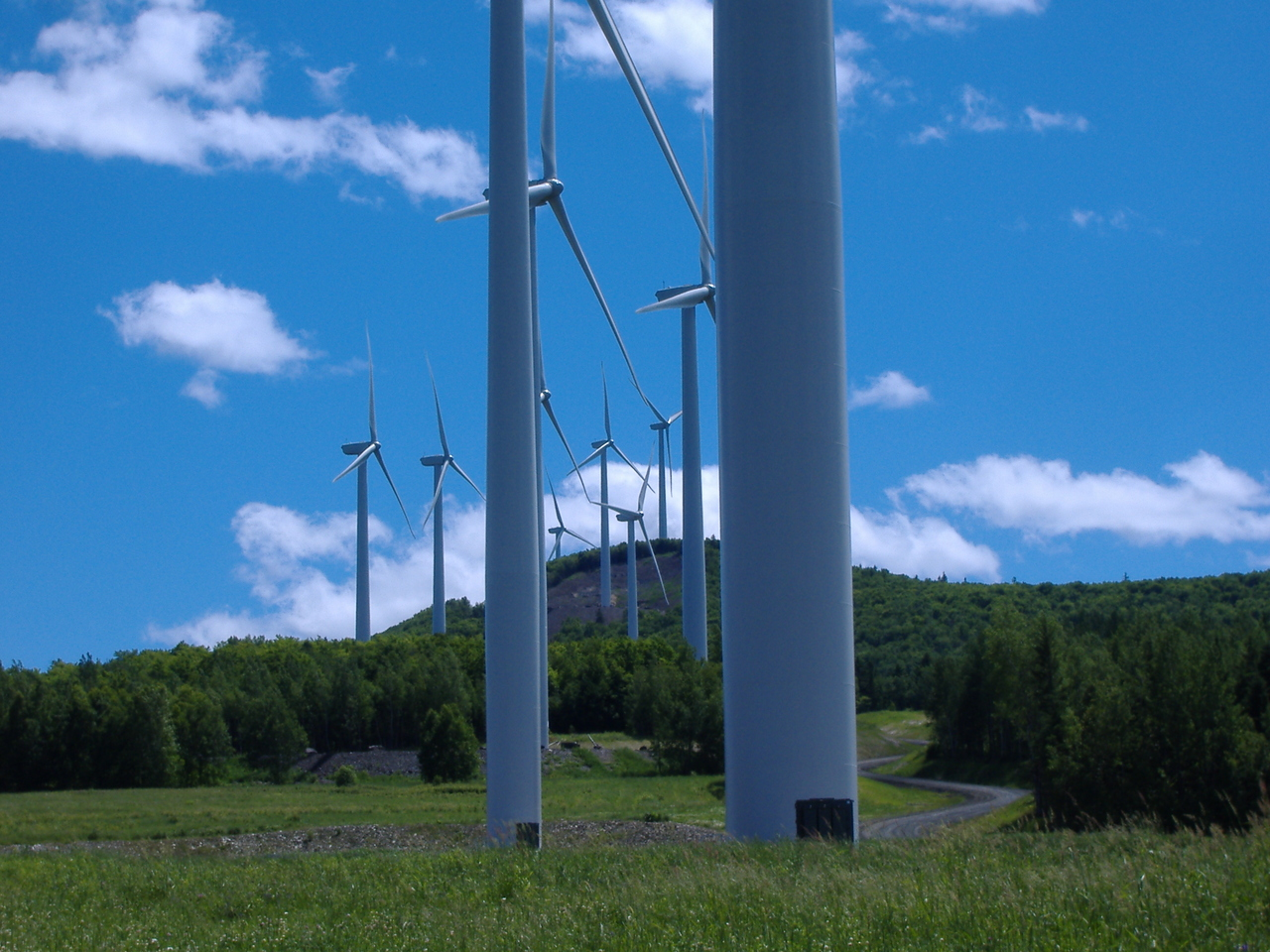
Mars Hill wind farm

In 2006, First Wind Holdings, LLC developed the first wind farm in Maine, on Mars Hill (46°31.26′N 67°48.82′W). First Wind installed 28 GE 1.5 MW Wind Turbines at a cost of $85 million along the top and northern section of the mountain. The blades attached to the hub of the turbine are about 115 ft (35 m) long. This is small compared to the wind turbines available in 2026.

=== Beaver Ridge ===
The three-turbine Beaver Ridge Wind Project is located in Freedom, Maine (44°29′48″N 69°20′01″W). It is owned and operated by Patriot Renewables and was commissioned on November 1, 2008.

=== Stetson Wind ===
==== Stetson I ====
The Stetson I wind farm consists of 38 GE 1.5 MW wind turbines, with a total capacity of 57 megawatts, strung along the north-south ridge of Stetson Mountain (45°31′34″N 67°58′35″W). It generates approximately 167 million kilowatt-hours (kW·h) of electricity per year and began commercial operations in January 2009. First Wind received $40.44 million from the federal government to complete the Stetson I project, which was one of twelve grants made to wind projects under the American Recovery and Reinvestment Act stimulus program.

==== Stetson II ====
In March 2009, the Maine Land Use Regulation Committee (LURC) approved First Wind's $60 million 25.5 MW Stetson II expansion. Seventeen turbines were installed on nearby Jimmy (45°37′48″N 67°58′47″W) and Owl (45°35′34″N 67°57′34″W) mountains.

First Wind was bought by SunEdison and TerraForm Power in November 2014.

=== Fox Islands ===
The Fox Islands Wind Power Project (44°05′38″N 68°52′05″W) is a 4.5 MW wind project consisting of three GE 1.5 MW wind turbines, providing power for North Haven and Vinalhaven Island. The $14.5 million project is expected to produce 11,600 megawatt-hours of electricity per year. Approved by a vote of 383–5 on July 29, 2008 by members of the Fox Islands Electric Cooperative, construction began on June 29, 2009, and the wind farm went online on November 17. The project has significantly reduced rates for island residents, who previously imported all their power from the mainland via a submarine power cable. However, the noise generated by the turbines has caused considerable controversy on the island.

=== University of Maine ===
In 2009, the University of Maine at Presque Isle installed a single 600 KW wind turbine on campus (46°40.0416′N 68°1.21′W) to reduce energy costs and carbon emissions. It produces approximately 680,000 KWh per year and saves the university approximately $100,000 in energy costs each year. The turbine was damaged in a fire in April 2018.

=== Kibby Mountain ===
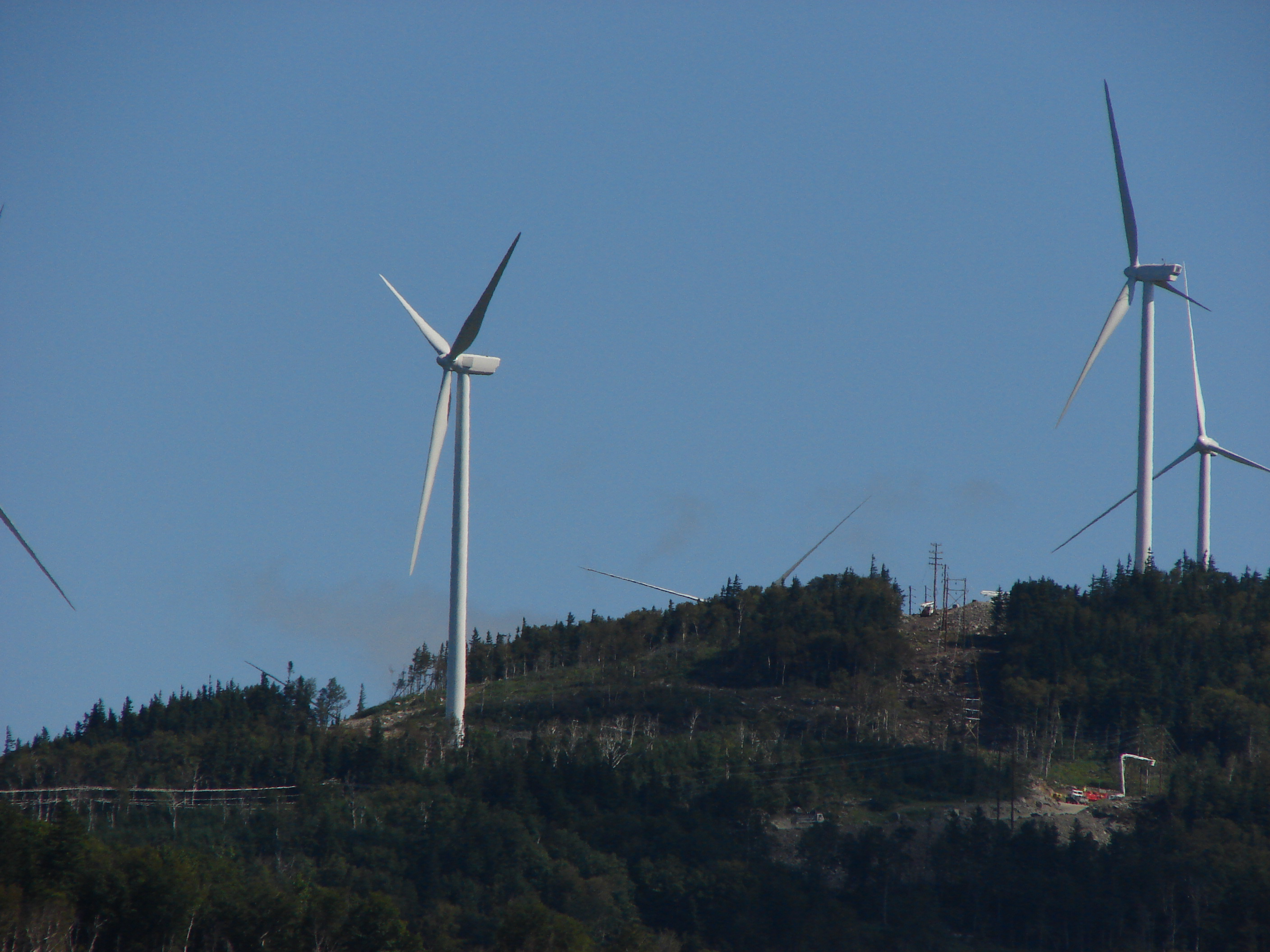
Kibby Wind Power

The Kibby Mountain wind farm project—at a capacity of 132 MW —comprises forty-four 3 MW wind turbines strung along the ridges of Kibby Mtn. (45°25.12′N 70°32.66′W) and nearby Kibby Range (45°21.13′N 70°34.58′W). It is expected to generate about 357 million kilowatt-hours (41 MW·yr) of electricity annually. Half of the turbines were put online in October 2009, and TransCanada completed the project in 2010. The capital cost of the project is approximately US $320 million. Work on clearing the site began by September 2008. Kibby was purchased by LS Power through its affiliate Helix Generation in 2017.

=== GSA ===
Two Northern Power Systems wind turbines were installed at the Jackman Land Port of Entry by the GSA to provide power for the U.S. border station (45.803226°N 70.395042°W). The two wind turbines produce 200 kW and approximately 400,000 kWh per year. This provides approximately 50% of the power required to operate the U.S. border station, and saves the station from burning approximately 38,000 US gallons (140 m^{3}) of fuel each year. Construction began in April 2010, and the project went online in March 2011.

=== Spruce Mountain ===
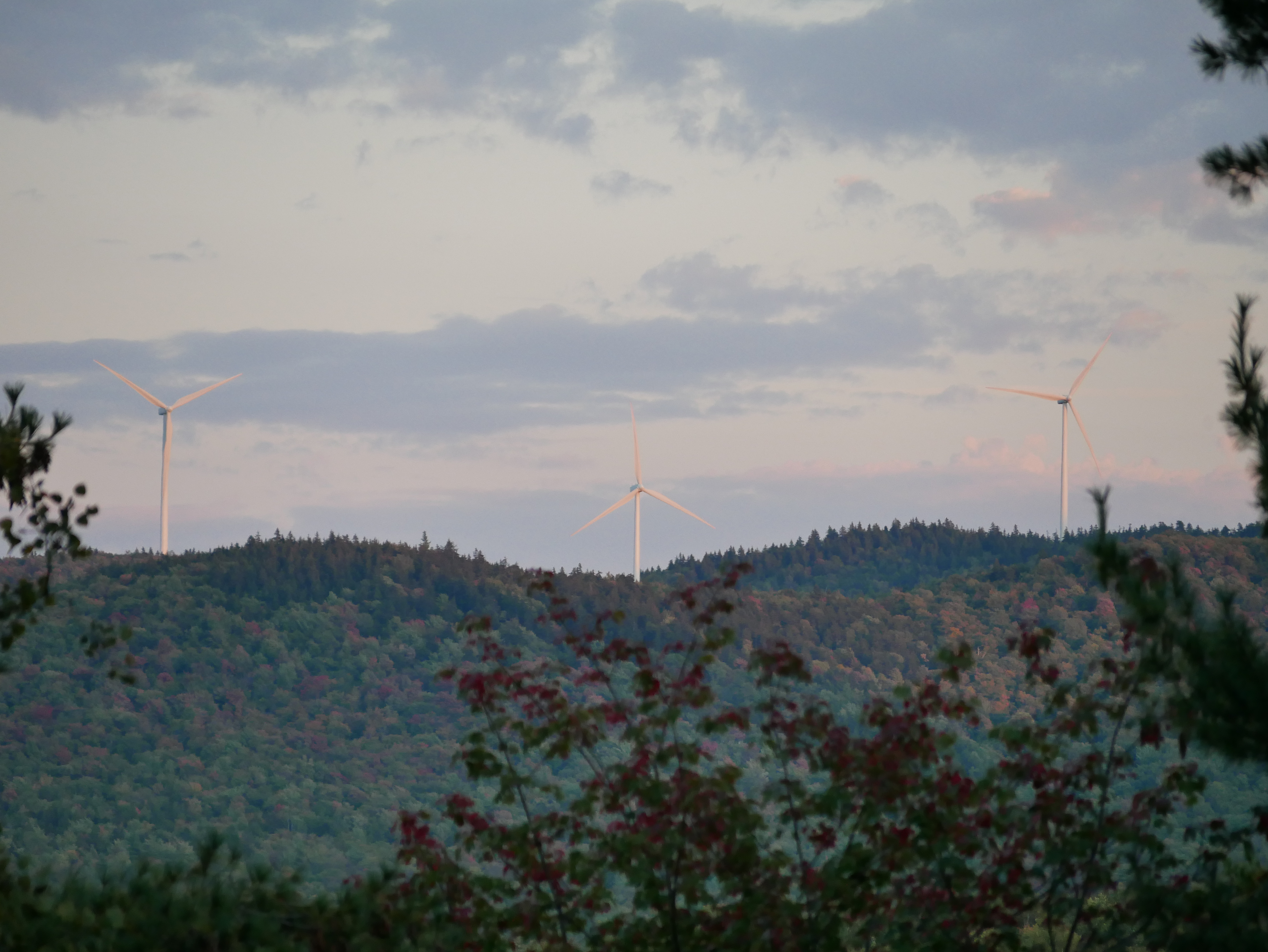
Spruce Mountain Wind Farm

The Spruce Mountain wind farm consists of 10 Gamesa G90 2-MW wind turbines. The project is located in Woodstock, Maine.(44°25′12″N 70°33′19″W)

=== Rollins Wind ===
In addition to the Stetson and Mars Hill projects, First Wind completed a 60 MW wind farm, with forty 1.5-MW turbines, on Rollins Mountain (45°23′14″N 68°21′49″W) and other hills in the Penobscot County towns of Lincoln, Burlington, Lee, and Winn. The estimated cost is US$130 million. First Wind was bought by SunEdison and TerraForm Power in November 2014.

=== Record Hill ===
Record Hill Wind is a 50.6 MW wind project in Roxbury, consisting of 22 turbines arrayed along a four mile long north-south ridgeline connecting Record Hill, Flathead Mountain (44°39′40″N 70°37′41″W), and Partridge Peak. The electrical output of the project is estimated to be approximately 160 million kW·h (18 MW·yr) per year.

=== Bull Hill ===
A 34.2 MW wind project on Bull Hill (44°43′34″N 68°10′11″W) and adjoining hills in Maine Township 16 MD was built by First Wind and put online October 31, 2012. The $78.5 million project consists of 19 Vestas V100-1.8MW wind turbines. First Wind was bought by SunEdison and TerraForm Power in November 2014.

=== Oakfield Wind ===
The Oakfield wind project at 148 MW was completed in 2015. The project is located near Oakfield (46°06′N 68°09′W) and uses 48 Vestas wind turbines.

=== Saddleback Ridge ===
The Saddleback Ridge wind project is a 34.2 megawatt, 12-turbine wind project located in Carthage, Maine (44°36′21″N 70°22′33″W). It uses GE's 2.85 MW wind turbines and was developed by Patriot Renewables.

=== Passadumkeag Windpark ===
The Passadumkeag Windpark is located on Passadumkeag Mountain near Burlington, Maine (45°07′55″N 68°21′31″W). It consists of 13 Vestas V112 3.0 series wind turbines with a rated capacity of 3.3 MW.

=== Hancock Wind ===
The Hancock Wind project is a project developed by Novatus Energy which consists of 17 Vestas V117 3.0 MW turbines. The project is located in Franklin, Maine (44°45′53″N 68°07′14″W). Hancock Wind currently has the tallest onshore wind turbines in the United States.

=== Bingham Wind Farm ===
The Bingham Wind Farm was developed by Novatus Energy and is located near Kingsbury Plantation, Maine (45°07′58″N 69°41′29″W). It consists of 56 Vestas V112 3.3 MW turbines.

=== Pisgah Mountain ===
Pisgah Mountain wind farm is owned by Pisgah Mountain LLC and operates five Vestas V90-1.8 MW wind turbines in Clifton Maine (44°46′31″N 68°31′20″W). Seven local owners own 51% of Pisgah Mountain LLC and the remaining 49% is owned by SWEB Development USA, a subsidiary of WEB Windenergie.

=== Canton Mountain Wind Project ===
The Canton Mountain Wind Project consists of eight GE 2.85 megawatt wind turbines with 103 meter rotors on 85 meter towers. It was developed by Patriot Renewables. It is located in Canton, Maine (44°31′02″N 70°18′09″W), and went online in November, 2017.

=== Downeast Wind ===
The Downeast Wind Project consists of 30 Vestas V150 4.2 megawatt turbines which carry a rotor diameter of 150 meters on 120 meter towers. The project was developed by Apex Clean Energy. It is located in Washington County, Maine (44°42′13″N 67°52′33″W).

== Offshore wind energy ==
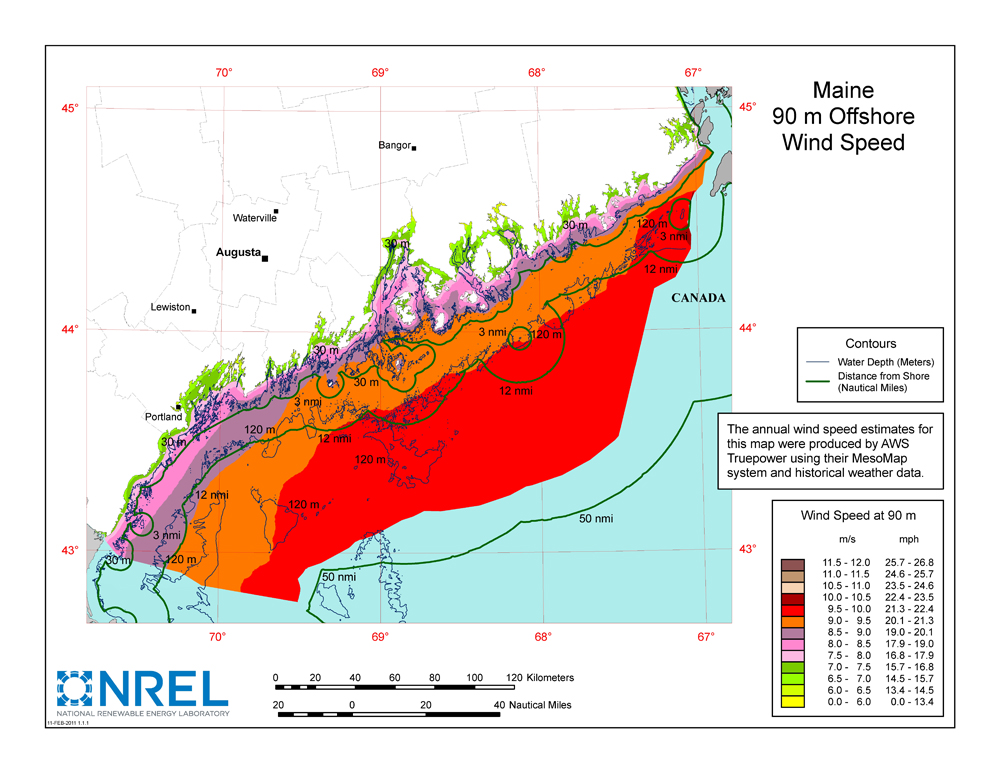
Average wind speed at 90 meters along the coast of Maine

Offshore wind energy represents Maine's largest untapped natural energy resource, rated at 156 GW. The University of Maine Advanced Structures and Composites Center has led efforts to develop this resource with its patented floating wind turbine technology, VolturnUS.

In 2008, as a result of the Maine Ocean Energy Task Force, Maine established a renewable ocean energy goal, including the installation of 5 GW of offshore wind energy by 2030.

North America’s first offshore wind turbine was deployed in 2013. The VolturnUS is a floating concrete hull design that can support a wind turbine in waters 45 meters deep or more. In 2013, a 1:8th scale VolturnUS hull with a 65-foot (20 m) turbine was towed into Penobscot Bay near Castine, Maine where it was connected to the grid and tested for 18 months. Following the successful deployment of the VolturnUS Maine Aqua Ventus 1, GP, LLC, is leading a demonstration project off Monhegan Island, called New England Aqua Ventus I using the same floating hull and turbine technology.

== Proposed wind projects ==
Electricity generation sources in Maine

=== New England Aqua Ventus I ===
New England Aqua Ventus I is an up to 12 MW floating offshore wind pilot project that will be anchored off Monhegan Island at the UMaine Deepwater Offshore Wind Test Site in Lincoln County. It will use a single 9.5 MW turbine mounted on the VolturnUS floating concrete hull. It is intended to demonstrate the potential for floating wind power on the New England coast. Project participants include the Cianbro Corporation and the University of Maine. In June 2019, Maine Governor Janet Mills signed into law LD 994, sponsored by state Sen. David Woodsome, directing the Maine Public Utilities Commission to approve a 20-year, long-term power purchase contract. That contract was unanimously approved by the Maine PUC on November 5, 2019, and signed by Central Maine Power (CMP) on December 20, 2019. New England Aqua Ventus I is anticipated to be the first commercial-scale floating wind project in the United States.

=== King Pine ===
The King Pine wind farm is planned to provide 1000 MW of power in Aroostook County. It is projected to begin construction in 2026 and will double Maine's wind power capacity, producing the equivalent of 27% of Maine's electric usage. Its developer, Longwood Energy, projects a cost of $2 billion. A new 345 kV tramission line will connect it to the ISO New England grid, and 40% of electricity will be purchased by utilities in Massachusetts.

== Wind projects ==
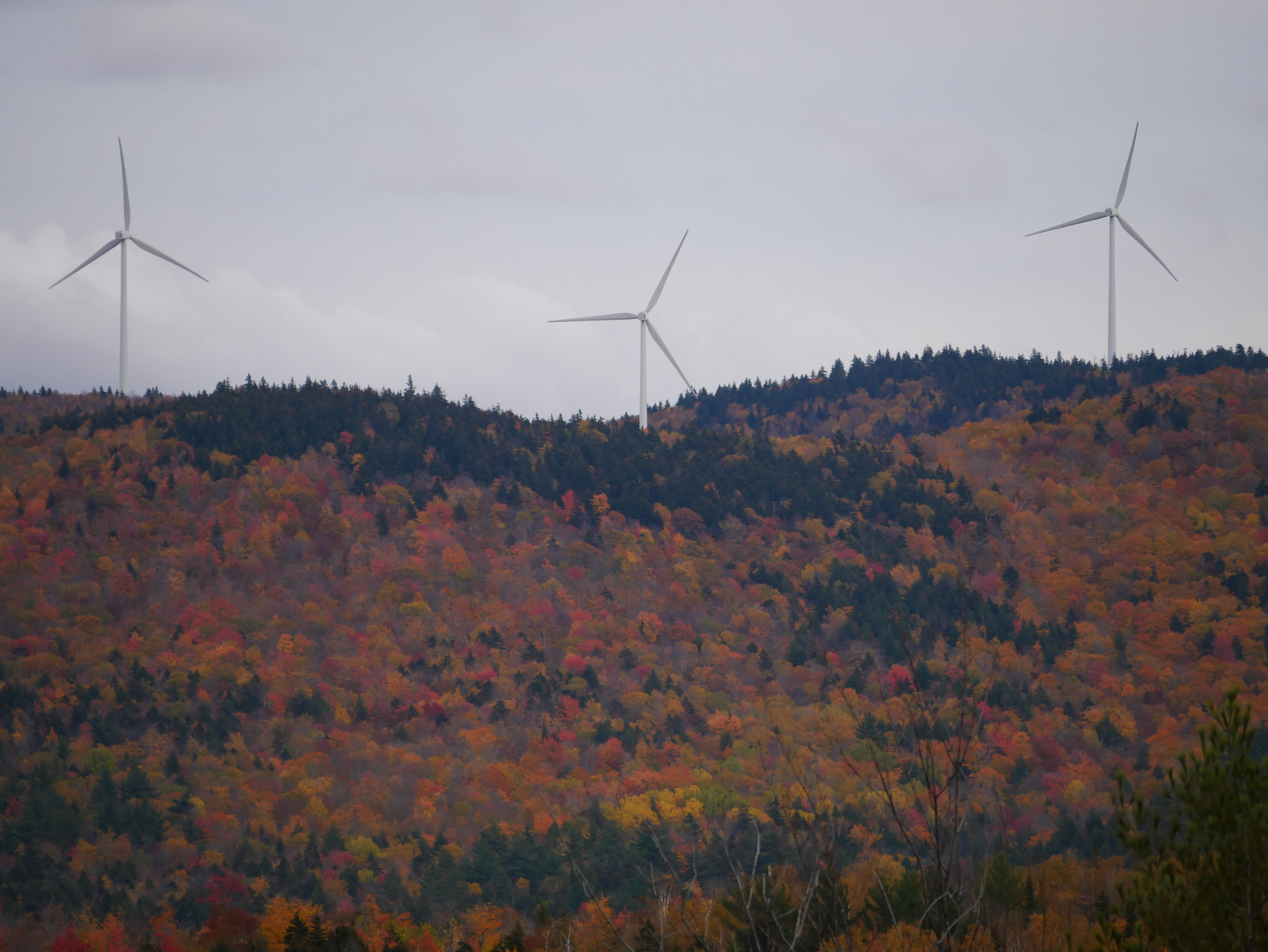
Spruce Mountain Wind Farm in the fall

Maine wind turbines
Name	Capacity (MW)	Number of turbines	Location (county)	Developer	Completed
Mars Hill	42	28	Aroostook	SunEdison	2006
Beaver Ridge	4.5	3	Waldo	Patriot Renewables	2008
Stetson I	57	38	Washington	SunEdison	2009
Fox Islands	4.5	3	Knox	Fox Islands Electric Cooperative	2009
University of Maine	0.6	1	Aroostook	University of Maine	2009
Kibby Mountain	132	44	Franklin	LS Power	2010
Stetson II	25.5	17	Washington	SunEdison	2010
GSA	.2	2	Somerset	GSA	2010
Spruce Mountain	20	10	Oxford	Patriot Renewables	2011
Rollins	60	40	Penobscot	SunEdison	2011
Record Hill	50.6	22	Oxford	Independence Wind	2012
Bull Hill	34.2	19	Hancock	SunEdison / Blue Sky East	2012
Oakfield	148	48	Aroostook	SunEdison	2015
Saddleback Ridge	34.2	12	Franklin	Patriot Renewables LLC	2015
Passadumkeag Windpark	42.9	13	Penobscot	Quantum Utility Generation	2016
Hancock Wind	51	17	Hancock County	Novatus Energy	2016
Bingham Wind Farm	184.8	56	Somerset & Piscataquis	Novatus Energy	2016
Pisgah Mountain	9	5	Penobscot	Pisgah Mountain LLC	2016
Canton Mountain	22.8	8	Oxford	Patriot Renewables LLC	2017

== Canceled proposals ==
=== Redington and Black Nubble ===
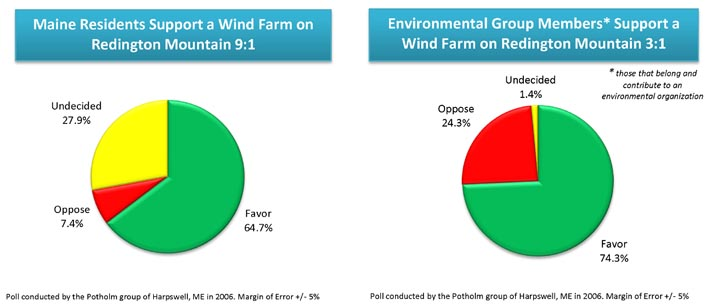
Public opinion for a proposed wind farm on Redington Mountain

In 2005, Maine Mountain Power (MMP) filed an application with the Maine Land Use Regulation Committee (LURC) for a permit to develop a 30-turbine wind farm on Mount Redington (45°1.50′N 70°23.32′W) and neighboring Black Nubble (45°1.92′N 70°26.83′W). After years of contentious debate, the proposal was voted down by the LURC in 2007. The summit of Redington was seen as too ecologically sensitive — a sub-alpine fir habitat providing a home for two rare species, the bog lemming and Bicknell's thrush. Also, the development would have been visible for miles along the Appalachian Trail (AT). A revised proposal, for 18 turbines only on Black Nubble, was put forward by MMP, and was supported by many environmental groups, but was still opposed by Maine Audubon. The project was rejected by the LURC in 2008.

=== Longfellow ===
First Wind proposed an installation on Black Mountain (44°35′02″N 70°38′15″W) in Rumford.

The Longfellow project would have 16 turbines that could produce 40 MW of electricity, enough to power about 17,000 homes in the Northeast. The power would be sold to the New England power grid. The wind turbines would have been built on the west side of the mountain, away from the Black Mountain ski area. The developer placed the project on hold due to the strength of wind gusts in the area.

=== Hywind 2 ===
In April 2012, Statoil, a Norwegian multinational oil and gas company, received state regulatory approval to build a large four-unit demonstration floating wind farm off the coast of Maine called Hywind 2. Statoil proposed building a 4-tower, 12–15 MW wind farm developed by Statoil North America for placement 20 kilometres (12 mi) off the east coast of Maine in 140–158 metres (459–518 ft)-deep water of the Atlantic Ocean. Like the first Hywind installation off Norway, the proposed turbine foundation was a spar buoy.

The State of Maine Public Utility Commission voted to approve the construction and fund the US$120 million project by adding approximately 75 cents/month to the average retail electricity consumer. Power would have been flowing into the grid no earlier than 2016.

Statoil placed Hywind 2 on hold in July 2013 as a result of new legislation (LD 1472) by the State of Maine. The legislation required the Maine Public Utilities Commission to undertake a second round of bidding with a different set of ground rules; this led Statoil to suspend the project due to increased uncertainty and risk. Statoil ultimately abandoned the Hywind 2 project in Maine, and developed Hywind Scotland instead.

== Community debate ==
A statewide poll in the spring of 2007 by the Pan Atlantic SMS Group showed that 85% of Maine people supported wind power development.

A 2009 poll conducted by Portland-based Critical Insights shows that 90% of Maine people supported the development of wind power as a source of electricity. Nearly nine in ten Mainers agreed that "wind power can improve energy security and reduce Maine's dependence on fossil fuels, and eight in ten agree[d] that wind power will produce jobs and other forms of economic benefits".

In a 2010 statewide telephone poll of 500 registered voters, 88 percent supported wind power in Maine. Calls to residents in seven rural counties, from Aroostook to Oxford, where most wind power projects are built or planned, showed 83 percent support. Survey results show that Maine residents strongly supported wind power development, chiefly because it cuts dependence on fossil fuels and creates jobs. The survey was done by Portland-based Pan Atlantic SMS Group for the Maine Renewable Energy Association.

Some community opposition has arisen, in the form of litigation against mountain wind farms and an ocean wind turbine proposal, as civic activism, and as development of municipal ordinances.

== Wind generation ==
Maine wind generation (GWh, million kWh)
Year	Total	Jan	Feb	Mar	Apr	May	Jun	Jul	Aug	Sep	Oct	Nov	Dec
2007	99				12	10	8	6	8	14	14	10	17
2008	133	17	12	12	11	9	7	7	7	10	14	14	13
2009	298	16	31	27	29	23	20	14	18	21	31	38	30
2010	500	38	40	44	33	40	26	31	21	30	70	59	68
2011	709	63	76	71	64	40	36	40	39	41	81	85	73
2012	779	106	97	84	82	48	55	50	44	61	96	58	104
2013	1,047	106	89	100	98	73	66	56	70	75	87	130	97
2014	1,098	121	101	120	103	66	67	67	46	82	106	126	93
2015	1,295	136	114	132	113	99	75	62	55	77	129	167	136
2016	1,668	164	157	138	128	107	117	105	113	106	144	163	226
2017	2,333	216	248	246	181	177	159	102	134	140	209	259	262
2018	2,384	272	223	279	192	173	149	124	101	134	248	240	249
2019	2,494	247	275	275	255	158	148	116	108	161	203	258	290
2020	2,140	179	209	264	262	238	123	92	136	192	197	248	254
2021	2,549	247	211	312	248	203	191	134	106	181	180	253	283
2022	2,455	292	274	296	285	198	171	170	117	171	196	287	285
2023	765	243	245	277									

Maine wind generation in 2018

Maine wind generation in 2017

== See also ==
- Solar power in Maine
- Wind power in the United States
- Renewable energy in the United States
- Ocean Renewable Power Company
- UMaine Deepwater Offshore Wind Test Site
