= University of Maine =

Public research university in Orono, Maine, US

- Former names: Maine State College of Agriculture and the Mechanic Arts (1865–1897); University of Maine (1897–1971); University of Maine at Orono (1971–1986); University of Maine (1986-present)
- Motto: On seal: Dirigo (Latin)
- Motto in English: "I direct"
- Type: Public land-grant research university
- Established: 1865; 161 years ago
- Parent institution: University of Maine System
- Accreditation: NECHE
- Academic affiliations: UArctic; Sea-grant; Space-grant
- Endowment: $442.2 million (2025)
- Chancellor: Dannel Malloy
- President: Joan Ferrini-Mundy
- Faculty: 578
- Students: 10,878 (fall 2024)
- Undergraduates: 8,442 (fall 2024)
- Postgraduates: 2,428 (fall 2024)
- Location: Orono, Maine, United States; 44.902°N 68.668°W
- Campus: 660 acres (2.7 km^{2}); Small suburb
- Other campuses: Machias; Portland
- Newspaper: The Maine Campus
- Colors: Maine blue, white, and navy
- Nickname: Black Bears
- Sporting affiliations: NCAA Division I FCS – AmEast; CAA Football; Hockey East; NEISA
- Mascot: Bananas T. Bear
- Website: umaine.edu
- University of Maine Historic District
- U.S. National Register of Historic Places
- U.S. Historic district
- Location: Munson, Sebec, and Schoodic Rds., Orono, Maine
- Area: 660 acres (267.1 ha) (entire campus); 13 acres (5.3 ha) (original historic district); 57 acres (23 ha) (increased historic district)
- Built: 1868
- Architectural style: Late 19th and 20th Century Revivals, Late Victorian, Greek Revival
- NRHP reference No.: 78000194 (original); 10000228 (increase)

Significant dates
- Added to NRHP: July 12, 1978
- Boundary increase: April 27, 2010

The University of Maine (UMaine) is a public land-grant research university in Orono, Maine, United States. It was established in 1865 as the land-grant college of Maine and is the flagship university of the University of Maine System. The University of Maine offers over 90 undergraduate major programs organized in five colleges: the College of Education and Human Development; the College of Engineering; the Honors College; the College of Liberal Arts and Sciences; and the College of Earth, Life, and Health Sciences. UMaine also is home to the Honors College, one of the nation's oldest honors programs.

With an enrollment of approximately 11,500 students, UMaine is the state's largest college or university. The University of Maine's athletic teams, nicknamed the Black Bears, are the state's only National Collegiate Athletic Association (NCAA) Division I athletic program. Maine's men's ice hockey team has won two national championships (in 1993 and 1999), as well as appearing in 11 Frozen Fours.

It is classified among "Research 1: Very High Research Spending and Doctorate Production".

== History ==
=== 19th century ===
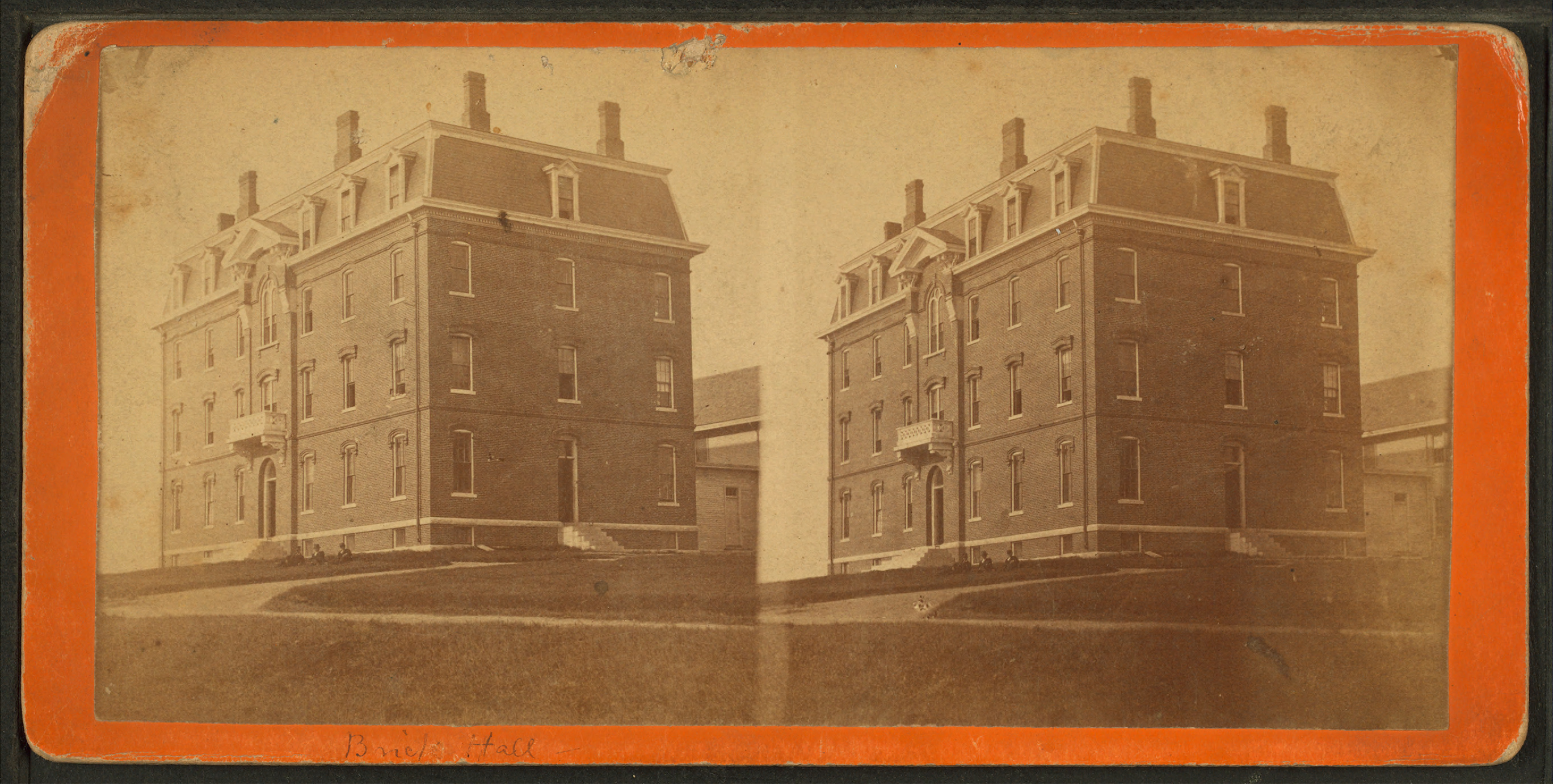
Brick Hall, constructed in 1871 and later renamed Oak Hall, burned in 1936

The University of Maine was founded in 1862 as a function of the Morrill Land-Grant Acts. Established in 1865 as the Maine State College of Agriculture and the Mechanic Arts, the college opened on September 21, 1868, and changed its name to the University of Maine in 1897.

By 1871, curricula had been organized in Agriculture, Engineering, and electives. The Maine Agricultural and Forest Experiment Station was founded as a division of the university in 1887. Gradually the university developed the Colleges of Life Sciences and Agriculture, later including the School of Forest Resources and the School of Human Development, Engineering and Science, and Arts and Sciences.

Near the end of the 19th century, the university expanded its curriculum to place greater emphasis on liberal arts. As a result of this shift, faculty hired during the early 20th century included Caroline Colvin, chair of the history department and the nation's first woman to head a major university department.

=== 20th century ===
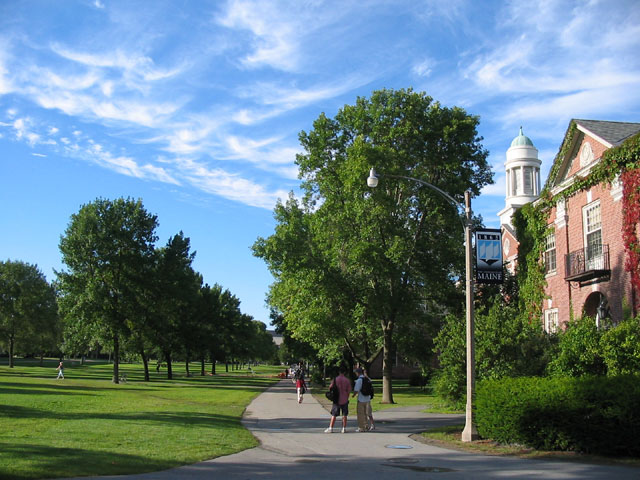
Stevens Hall in 2006

In 1912, the Maine Cooperative Extension, which offers field educational programs for both adults and youths, was initiated. The School of Education was established in 1930 and received college status in 1958. The School of Business Administration was formed in 1958 and was granted college status in 1965. Women have been admitted into all curricula since 1872. The first master's degree was conferred in 1881; the first doctor's degree in 1960. Since 1923 there has been a separate graduate school.

In 1906, The Senior Skull Honor Society was founded to "publicly recognize, formally reward, and continually promote outstanding leadership and scholarship, and exemplary citizenship within the University of Maine community."

In April 1925, The All Maine Women Traditions and Honor Society was founded. It is an honorary but non-scholastic honor society. The members are pledged "to uphold and promote the ideals, standards, and traditions of the University of Maine."

In 1968, when the University of Maine System was incorporated, the school was renamed by the legislature over the objections of the faculty to the University of Maine at Orono, known informally as U.M.O. Its name was restored to the University of Maine in 1986, and the U.M.O. moniker was also abandoned and replaced officially with "UMaine" as the informal title with which to reference the Orono campus.

== Organization and administration ==
The University of Maine is the flagship of the University of Maine System. The president of the university is Joan Ferrini-Mundy, who was appointed in 2018. The senior administration governs cooperatively with the chancellor of the University of Maine system, Dannel Malloy, and the sixteen members of the University of Maine Board of Trustees (of which fifteen are appointed by the governor of Maine and one is the current Maine state commissioner of education). The Board of Trustees has full legal responsibility and authority for the university system. It appoints the chancellor and each university president, approves the establishment and elimination of academic programs, confers tenure on faculty members, and sets tuition rates and operating budgets.

UMaine is also one of a handful of colleges in the United States whose student government, which was established in 1978, is incorporated. It was incorporated in 1987 and is classified as a 501(c)(3) not-for-profit corporation.

== Campus ==
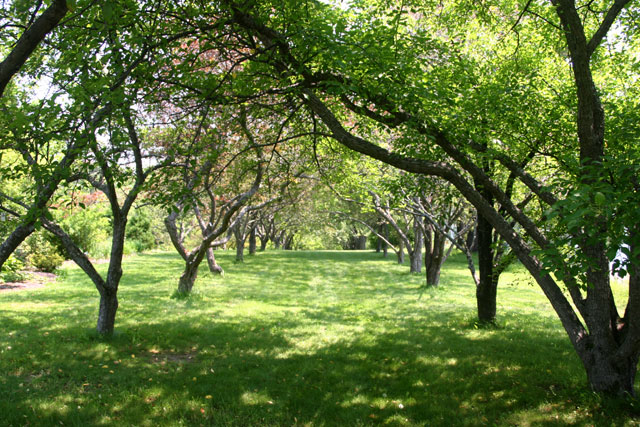
A tree-lined path through the Lyle E. Littlefield Ornamental Gardens in 2005

Situated on Marsh Island, between the Penobscot and Stillwater rivers, the University of Maine is the nation's only land grant university (other than the University of Hawaiʻi) on an island. The university occupies the small community of Orono, with a population of about 12,000 people, maintaining a 660-acre (2.7 km^{2}) campus. It has an enrollment of 11,989 students, inclusive of both undergraduate and graduate students, as of 2024.

The majority of the university property is in the Town of Orono and the Orono census-designated place. A portion of the university property is in Old Town.

The campus has 37 academic buildings, thirty administrative buildings, eighteen residence halls, eighteen specific laboratory facilities, fourteen Greek life houses, ten sports facilities, five museums, two dining facilities, two convenience stores, a student union, a cafe, a pub, an 87,000-square-foot (8,100 m^{2}) state of the art recreation and fitness center, and a 200'x200' air supported athletic/recreational dome.

In 1867, the university rejected a campus plan by landscape architect Frederick Law Olmsted, who designed Central Park in New York City and the White House grounds in Washington, D.C. The plan's broad concepts, including the Front Lawn, were nevertheless adopted during the school's first fifty years, and were oriented toward the Stillwater River. A second master plan was produced in 1932 by Carl Rust Parker of the Olmsted Brothers firm, which reoriented the campus center to the Mall, an open grassy area between the Raymond H. Fogler Library and the Memorial Gym. The Mall is further bordered by one residence and five academic halls.

The campus is essentially divided into three sections: northern, southern, and hilltop. Each is located near or borders the mall. The northern section includes many of the athletic facilities, including Alfond Arena for basketball and ice hockey, Morse Field at the Alfond Sports Stadium for football, track and field, Larry Mahaney Diamond for baseball, Kessock Field (softball), the Field Hockey Complex for field hockey, and the Mahaney athletic/recreational dome. Other buildings on the northern section include the Cutler Health Center, two administrative halls, three residence halls, and multiple academic halls.

The southern section of campus includes the Memorial Student Union, the Maynard F. Jordan Observatory, Lengyel Gymnasium and Athletic Field, the Buchanan Alumni House, and multiple administrative, residence, and academic halls. Collins Center for the Arts is on the southern part of campus. It provides the Hutchins Concert Hall, a 1,435-seat venue for performing artists from around the world, and the Hudson Museum. The Hilltop section of campus is populated largely with residence halls but also includes the 7-acre (2.8 ha) Lyle E. Littlefield Ornamental Gardens, as well as academic and recreational facilities. The campus is also designated as an arboretum.

In 1978, the pre-1915 core of the campus, covering its earliest period of development, was listed as a historic district on the National Register of Historic Places. In 2010, this was expanded to include the second major phase of development, which was completed through the end of World War II.

== Student life ==
Student body composition as of May 2, 2022
Race and ethnicity	Total
White	83%
Hispanic	5%
Other (Note: Other consists of Multiracial Americans & those who prefer to not say.)	4%
Black	2%
Foreign national	2%
Asian	2%
Other (Note: Other consists of Multiracial Americans & those who prefer to not say.)	2%
Economic diversity
Low-income (Note: The percentage of students who received an income-based federal Pell grant intended for low-income students.)	27%
Affluent (Note: The percentage of students who are a part of the American middle class at the bare minimum.)	73%

=== Ambulance service ===
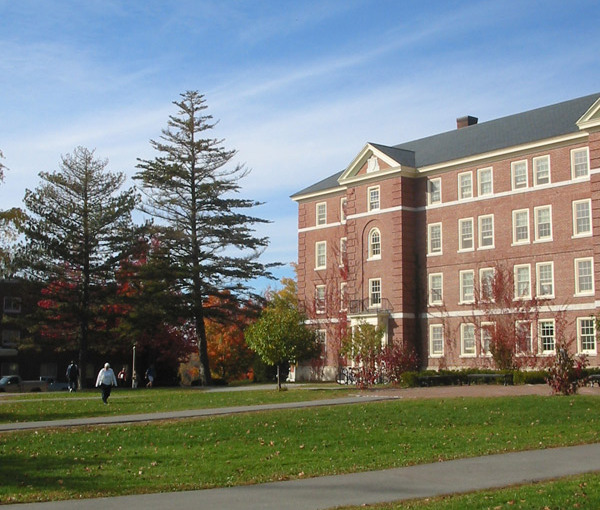
Oak Hall Dormitory in 2004

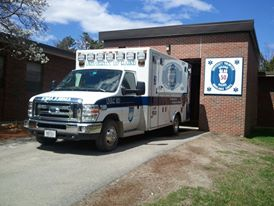
One of the University of Maine's ambulances, 2014

The University of Maine operates the "University Volunteer Ambulance Corps," an ambulance service fully licensed by the State of Maine. The service is operated by students and staff. UVAC's ambulances also provide aid to many surrounding towns and agencies. The service ensures a licensed Emergency Medical Technician is sent on every call. The service has two ambulances equipped to provide paramedic-level care, and responds to approximately 500 calls per school year.

=== Greek life ===
Greek life has existed at the University of Maine since 1874. Approximately 14% of University of Maine undergraduates are members of Greek letter organizations.

=== Sustainability ===
The University of Maine was one of 16 colleges and universities listed in Princeton Review's "Green Honor Roll" of 2011. The guide notes that UMaine has a sustainability coordinator, a sustainability council, and "Eco Reps" in its residence halls.

=== Dining services ===
The campus has two dining halls, Hilltop and York, and the Bear's Den Café & Pub in Memorial Union. Wells Dining Hall closed in fall 2022 due to a decrease in student enrollment. In fall 2023, the university deployed robots called Kiwibots to deliver food to students across campus. The Black Bear Exchange is the campus food pantry. The pantry is supported by the Good Shepherd Food Bank, donations, and food drives.

In 2022, the university signed a contract to outsource campus dining services to Sodexo beginning on July 1, 2023. Sodexo provides food service at Maine's six other public universities. The deal requires Sodexo to pay the university a $3 million signing bonus and invest $7 million in dining hall improvements. In 2024, the high number of complaints about bad food led the university to form weekly focus groups of students. The dining halls began stocking its fresh fruit bars all day.

=== The Maine Campus ===
Founded in 1875, The Maine Campus is a weekly newspaper produced by students. It covers university and Town of Orono events. The Campus is a direct-funded student organization and is not under the purview of student government. Stephen King wrote a weekly column for the Maine Campus in the 1970s called "King's Garbage Truck" and also published short stories such as "Slade" in the newspaper.

== Academics ==
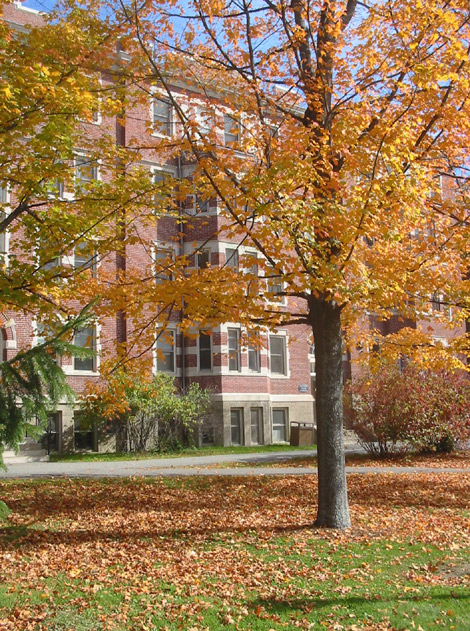
Hannibal Hamlin Hall on the campus in 2006

Academic rankings

National
- Forbes: 509
- U.S. News & World Report: 257
- Washington Monthly: 146
- WSJ/College Pulse: > 600

Global
- ARWU: 501–600

The University of Maine offers more than 90 undergraduate major programs organized in five colleges: the College of Education and Human Development; the College of Engineering; the Honors College; the College of Liberal Arts and Sciences; and the College of Earth, Life, and Health Sciences. UMaine also is home to one of the nation's oldest honors programs, now called the Honors College. The Honors College offers academically qualified students an opportunity for intensive, interdisciplinary study. Students are invited to become part of the Honors College during the admissions review process. UMaine also offers a wide array of graduate programs, including more than seventy master's degree programs and thirty doctorate programs.

The University of Maine is one of only a handful of institutions to offer a combined developmental/clinical PhD to students accepted into their clinical psychology PhD program, as well as advanced degrees with distinct concentrations in developmental psychology, social psychology, cognitive psychology, and behavioral neuroscience. Along with offering a PhD in psychological science with a concentration in behavioral neuroscience, they also offer a neuroscience concentration for PhD students studying biomedical science.

It is the only institution in Maine ranked as a national university in the U.S. News & World Report annual rankings. U.S. News categorizes UMaine as an institution that offers "a full range of undergraduate majors, master's, and doctoral degrees."

UMaine is one of only four institutions in Maine (along with Bowdoin, Bates, and Colby) accredited to award membership into the Phi Beta Kappa honor society.

The university is also the birthplace of the Phi Kappa Phi honor society, recognizing high academic achievement across all disciplines.

The Raymond H. Fogler Library is the largest in Maine and serves as one of its intellectual hubs, attracting scholars, professors, and researchers from around the state. A collection of rare and ancient manuscripts, as well as about two million government publications, augment the university's collection. The Special Collections Unit includes the Stephen King (author and UMaine alumnus) papers, which attract researchers from across the globe.

UMaine hosts the Intensive English Institute, an English as a second language program designed to help students develop their English language skills for success in school, business, and social communication. Due to budget cuts during the COVID-19 pandemic, the IEI was discontinued as of May 31, 2020.

The University of Maine is also home to the Maine Business School, the largest business school in the state. Paris-based international educational consulting organization Eduniversal has included the Maine Business School at the University of Maine among its selection of 1,000 of the world's best business schools, ranking it as an "excellent business school-nationally strong and/or with continental links." In 2011, U.S. News & World Report ranked the Maine Business School among the nation's best business colleges

The Canadian-American Center, an institution that focuses on Canadian-American studies is based at the University of Maine.

=== Accreditation ===
The University of Maine is accredited by the New England Commission of Higher Education, and programmatically accredited by the Association to Advance Collegiate Schools of Business, Accreditation Board for Engineering and Technology, American Chemical Society, American Dietetic Association, American Psychological Association, American Speech-Language-Hearing Association, Commission on Accreditation of Athletic Training Education, Commission on Collegiate Nursing Education, Computing Sciences Accreditation Board, Council for the Advancement of Educator Preparation, Council on Social Work Education, National Association of Schools of Music, National Association of Schools of Public Affairs and Administration, Society of American Foresters, and Society of Wood Science and Technology.

=== Admissions ===
The fall 2018 admissions data are as follows:

Student Classification	Applications	Acceptances	Enrollment
New First-Year Students	12,457	11,503	2,248
New Transfer Students	1,027	863	409
Graduate Students	1,423	845	499

=== Enrollment ===
In the fall of 2020, the university's enrollment consisted of:

- 8,870 undergraduate degree-seeking students
- 595 undergraduate non-degree students
- 2,121 graduate degree-seeking students
- 155 graduate non-degree students
- 9,110 full-time students
- 2,631 part-time students

== Research ==
=== UMaine Advanced Structures and Composites Center ===
The UMaine Advanced Structures and Composites Center, founded in 1996 with support from the National Science Foundation, provides research, education, and economic development encompassing material sciences, manufacturing and engineering of composites and structures. The center's research and development projects have included the VolturnUS 1:8, composite arch bridge system, and the Modular Ballistic Protection System (MBPS).

The center is the leading member of the DeepCwind Consortium, whose mission is to establish the State of Maine as a national leader in deepwater offshore wind technology.

=== Multisensory Interactive Media Lab ===
Founded in 2018, the Multisensory Interactive Media Lab (MIM Lab) is moving into an era of 'Internet of Everything,' in which everything and everyone will be digitally embedded and connected. In the MIM Lab of the University of Maine, academic researchers develop novel enabling technologies to explore the immense potential for the communication of our experiences – shifting focus from the current age of information towards a new age of experience. Many of their research works try to answer a fundamental question "How can we move beyond traditional visual- and auditory-based digital interfaces to form immersive sensory rich interactions in the context of real-world, augmented or virtual experiences?".

=== Forest Land Resources ===
The University of Maine is responsible for over 14,000 acres (5,700 ha) of land across Maine which is used for research and recreation. Among the most prominent are: Aroostook Farm, (Presque Isle, Maine); Bear Brook Watershed, (Hancock County, Maine); Dwight B. Demeritt Forest, (Orono, Maine / Old Town, Maine); Fay Hyland Bog, (Orono / Veazie, Maine); and Hirundo Wildlife Refuge, (Old Town, Maine).

=== Bureau of Labor Education ===
The Bureau of Labor Education at the University of Maine in August 1966 with funds appropriated by the Maine Legislature. Its mission is to ensure that "appropriate and specialized educational programs (be made) available to members of the Maine labor force, both organized and unorganized." Historian Charles Scontras has been affiliated with the BLE since its founding with his first book being published also in 1966.

=== Climate Change Institute ===
The University of Maine Climate Change Institute dates to 1973 and the founding of the Institute for Quaternary Studies. In 2002, it was renamed. The institute has mapped the difference between climate during the Ice Age and during modern times, connecting acid rain to human causes in the 1980s, and finding that the climate can change abruptly through analysis of ice core samples from Greenland. The institute maintains the Climate Reanalyzer, a website that provides data visualization tools based on climate and weather datasets from the National Oceanic and Atmospheric Administration and other meteorological organizations.

=== International collaboration ===
The university is an active member of the University of the Arctic. UArctic is an international cooperative network based in the Circumpolar Arctic region, consisting of more than 200 universities, colleges, and other organizations with an interest in promoting education and research in the Arctic region.

== Athletics ==
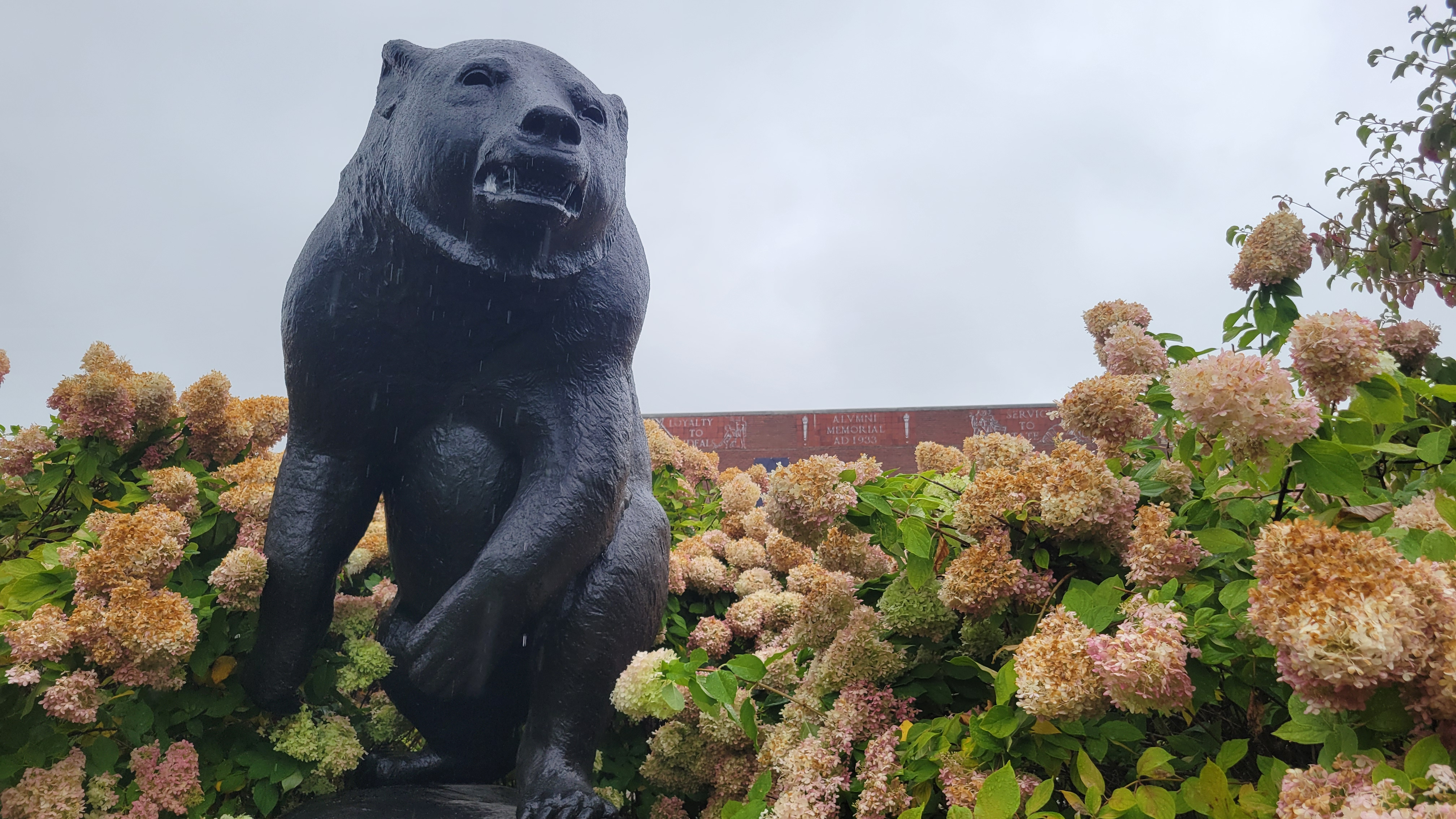
Bananas T. Bear, the school mascot, in front of Memorial Gym

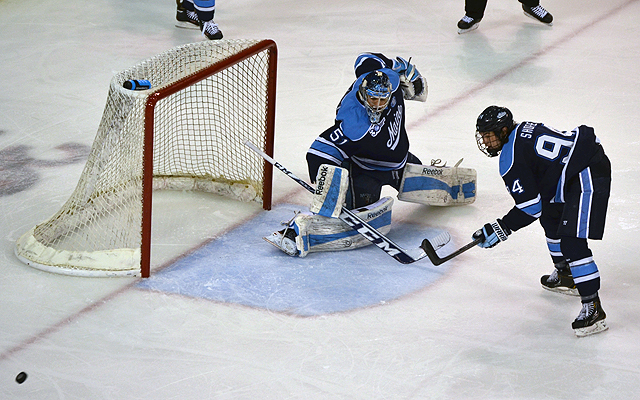
Maine Black Bears Division I men's ice hockey

The University of Maine participates in the NCAA's Division I level, and is a member of the Coastal Athletic Association for football, Hockey East for ice hockey, and the America East Conference for all other sports. The school has won two national championships, both in men's ice hockey. In 1993, UMaine defeated Lake Superior State University 5–4 behind a third period hat trick by Jim Montgomery. In 1999, the school defeated rival University of New Hampshire 3–2 in overtime on a goal by Marcus Gustafsson. UMaine appeared in 11 Frozen Fours and five national championship games from 1988 to 2007, emerging as one of the most successful collegiate programs in the sport.

In 1965, the football team competed in the Tangerine Bowl in Orlando, Florida against East Carolina. They were beaten in the game 31–0, but remain the only team from Maine to compete in a bowl contest.

Although the official fight song of UMaine is "For Maine", the school's main spirit song is the better-known "Maine Stein Song". Written by Lincoln Colcord (words) and E. A. Fenstad (music), the tune rose to fame when singer Rudy Vallée arranged the current version. Vallee attended Maine from 1921 to 1922 before transferring to Yale, and his popularity helped make the song a national favorite. To this day, the "Stein Song" remains the only college fight song to ever reach number one on the pop charts, achieving this distinction in 1930. According to College Fight Songs: An Annotated Anthology, by Studwell and Schueneman, the "Stein Song" is one of the very best fight songs of all time.

== Notable alumni ==
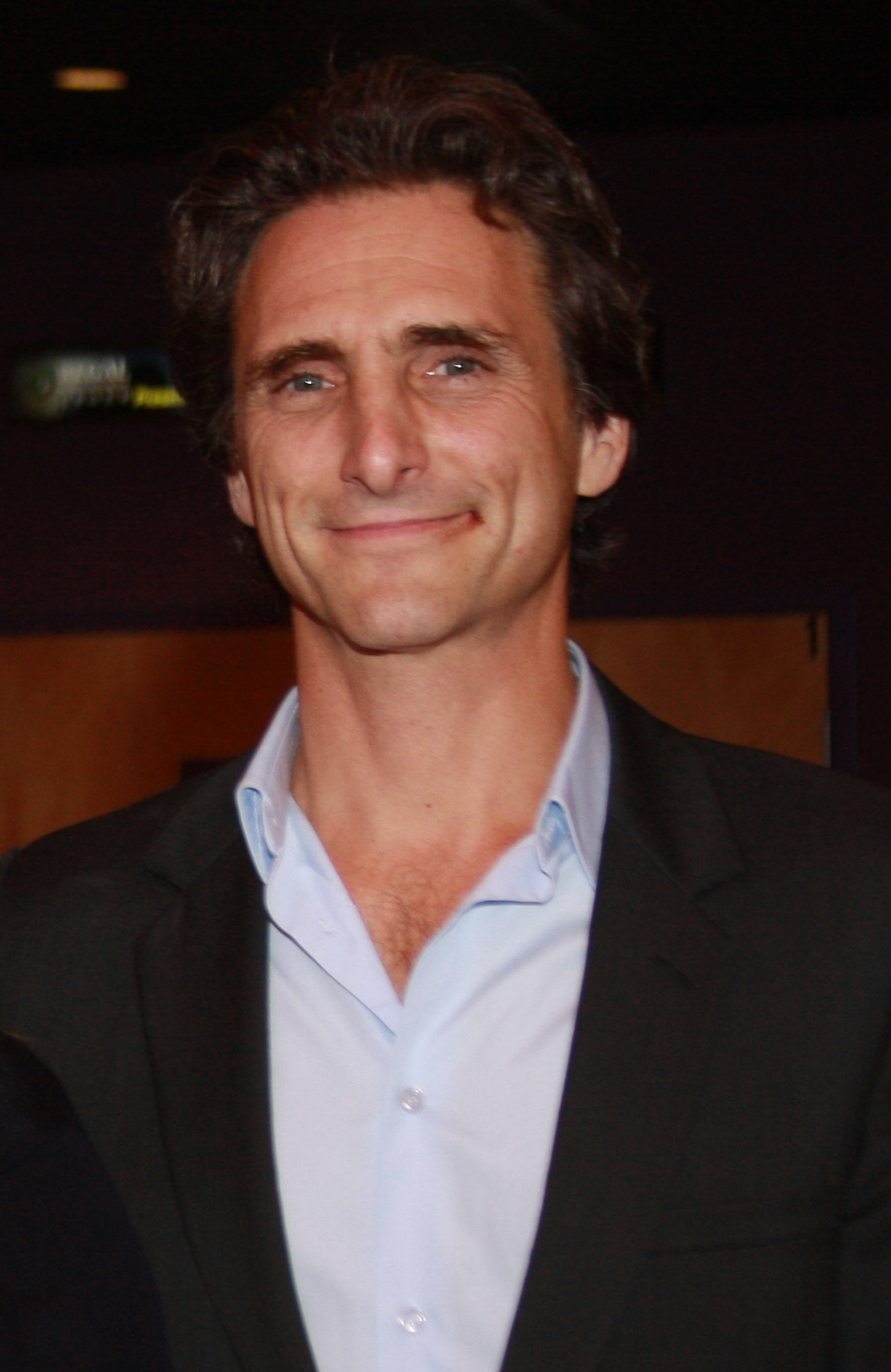
Lawrence Bender, Three-time Academy Award–nominated film producer

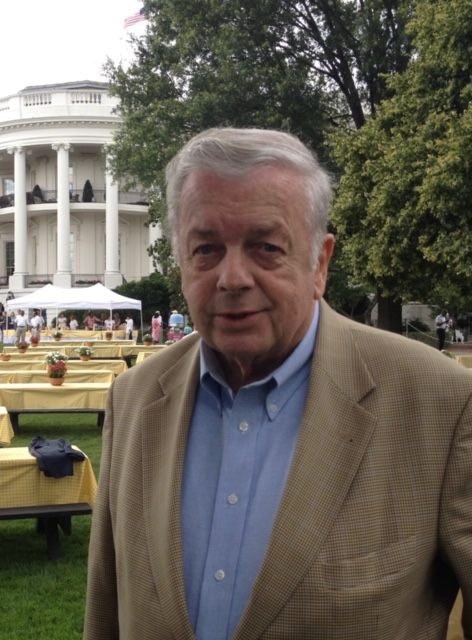
Joseph E. Brennan, 70th Governor of Maine and former congressman

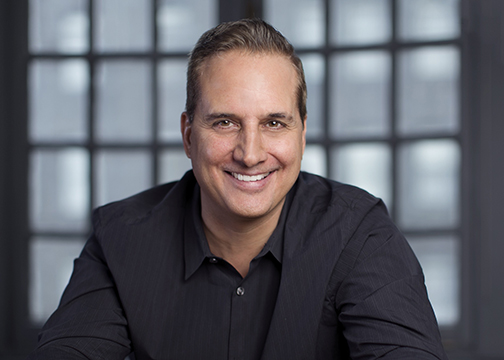
Nick Di Paolo, stand-up comedian, actor, writer, and podcaster

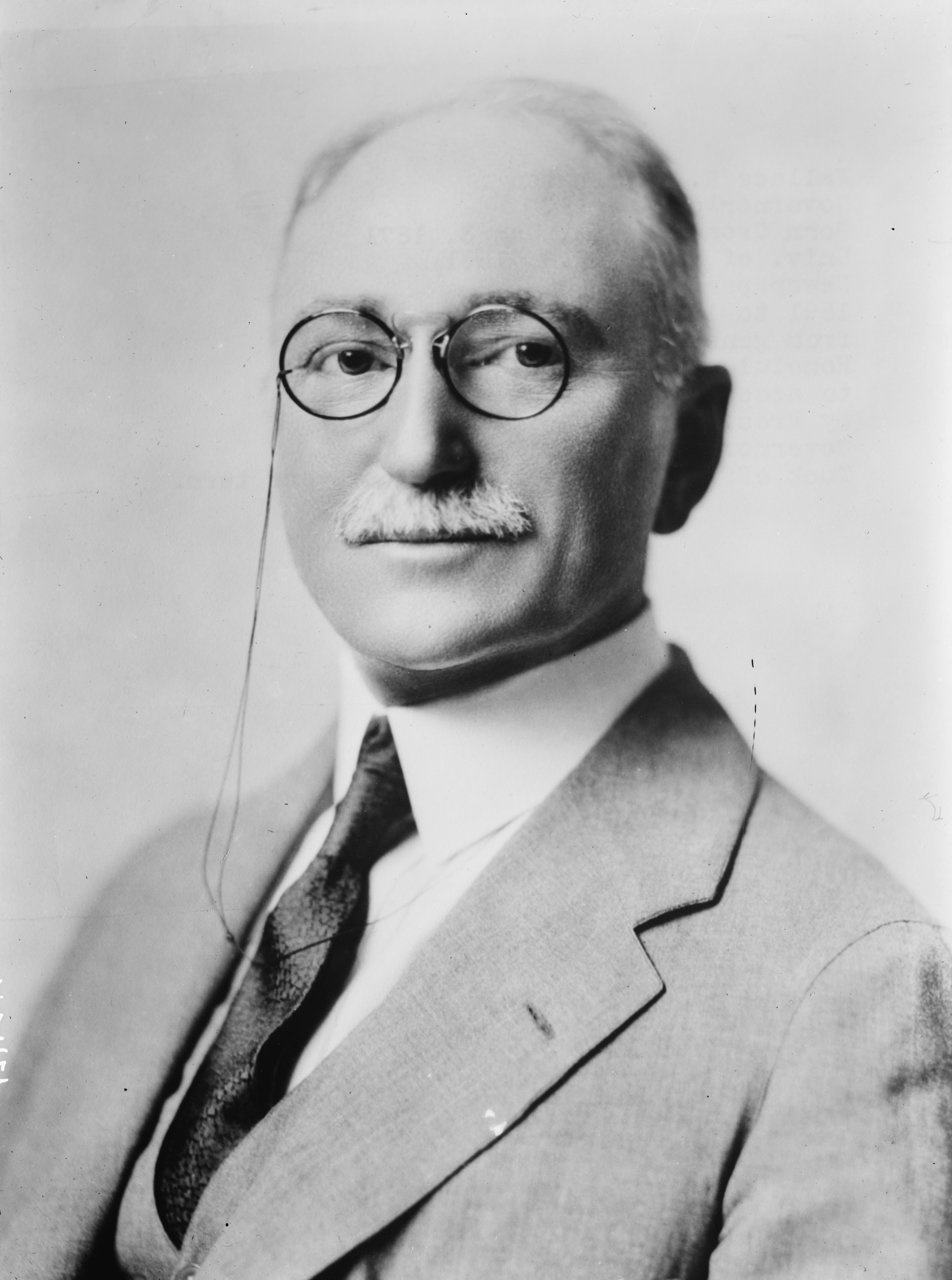
Wallace Rider Farrington, governor of Hawaii

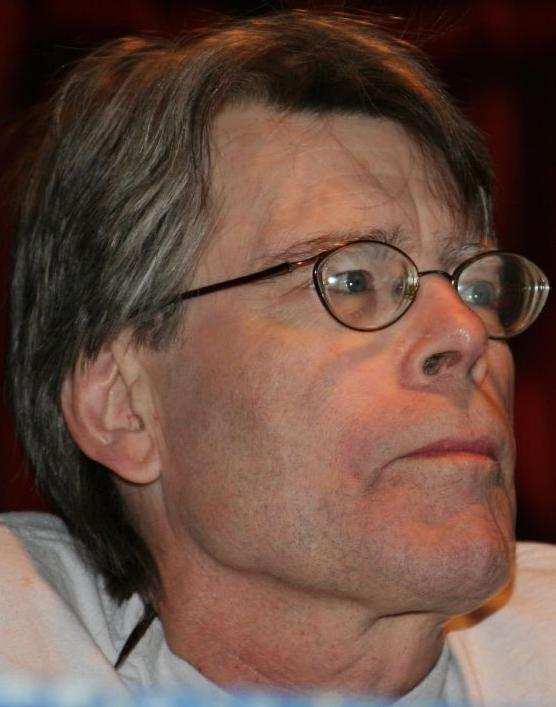
Stephen King, best-selling novelist

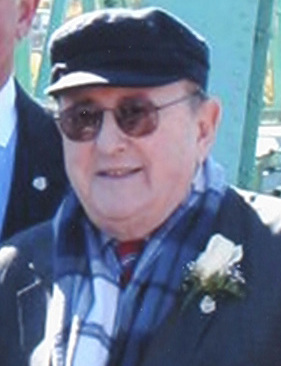
Bernard Lown, Nobel Peace Prize-laureate and inventor of direct current defibrillator

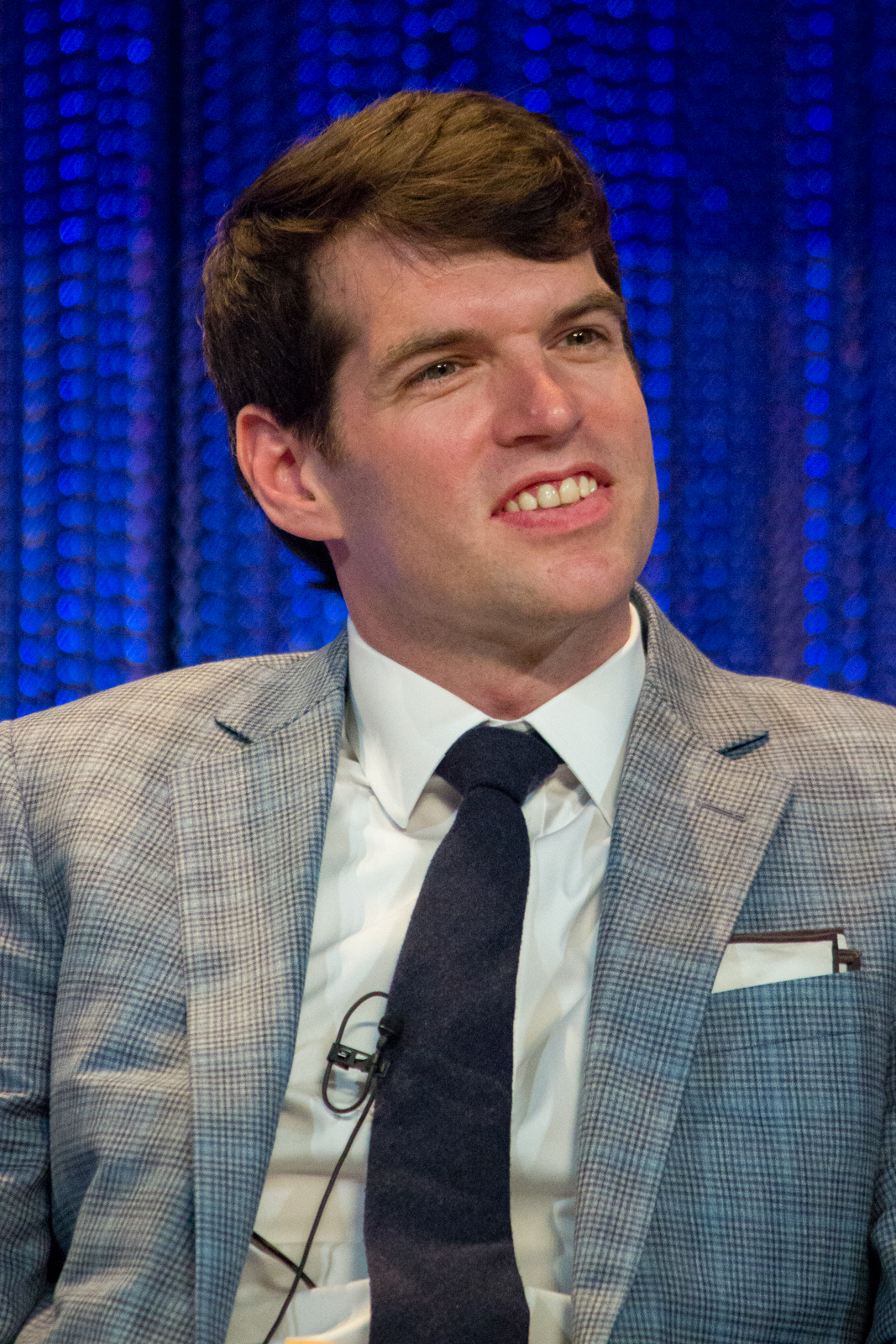
Timothy Simons, actor and comedian

== See also ==
- University of Maine School of Law
