= Shutdown Mountain (Maine) =

Mountain in Maine, United States

- Location within Maine

Highest point
- Elevation: 2,539 ft (774 m)
- Prominence: 939 ft (286 m)
- Coordinates: 45°25′03″N 70°11′58″W

Geography
- Location: Somerset County, Maine, U.S.
- Topo map: USGS Enchanted Pond

Shutdown Mountain is a mountain located in Somerset County, Maine.

Shutdown Mountain lies within the watershed of the Kennebec River and has two peaks, Shutdown Peak and Bulldog Peak (elevation 2260 ft.), sometimes referred to as Bulldog Mountain. The northern and southern sides of Shutdown Mountain drain into Enchanted Stream, then into the Dead River, a tributary of the Kennebec River. The west side of Shutdown drains into Stony Brook, then into the Dead River. The east side drains into Enchanted Pond, then into Enchanted Stream and into the Dead River.

There is a marked hiking trail (called "Enchanted Lookout") to the top of Bulldog Peak which has a prominence of 817 ft. overlooking Enchanted. The trailhead is located at Bulldog Camps, a traditional Maine sporting camp on the north shore of Enchanted Pond.

== See also ==
- List of mountains in Maine
