= Camp DeForest =

Summer camp in Lincolnville, Maine

- Summer Camp
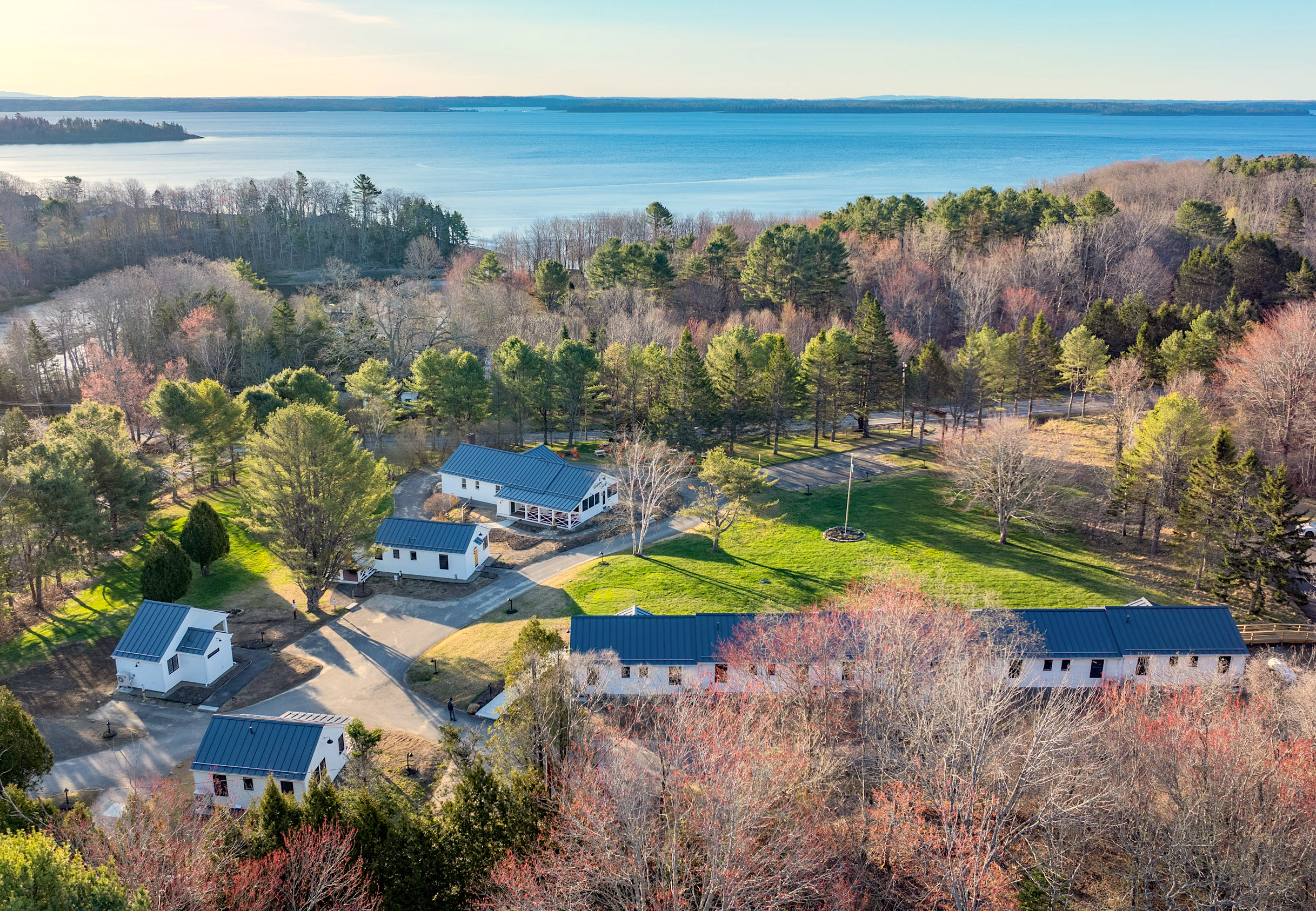

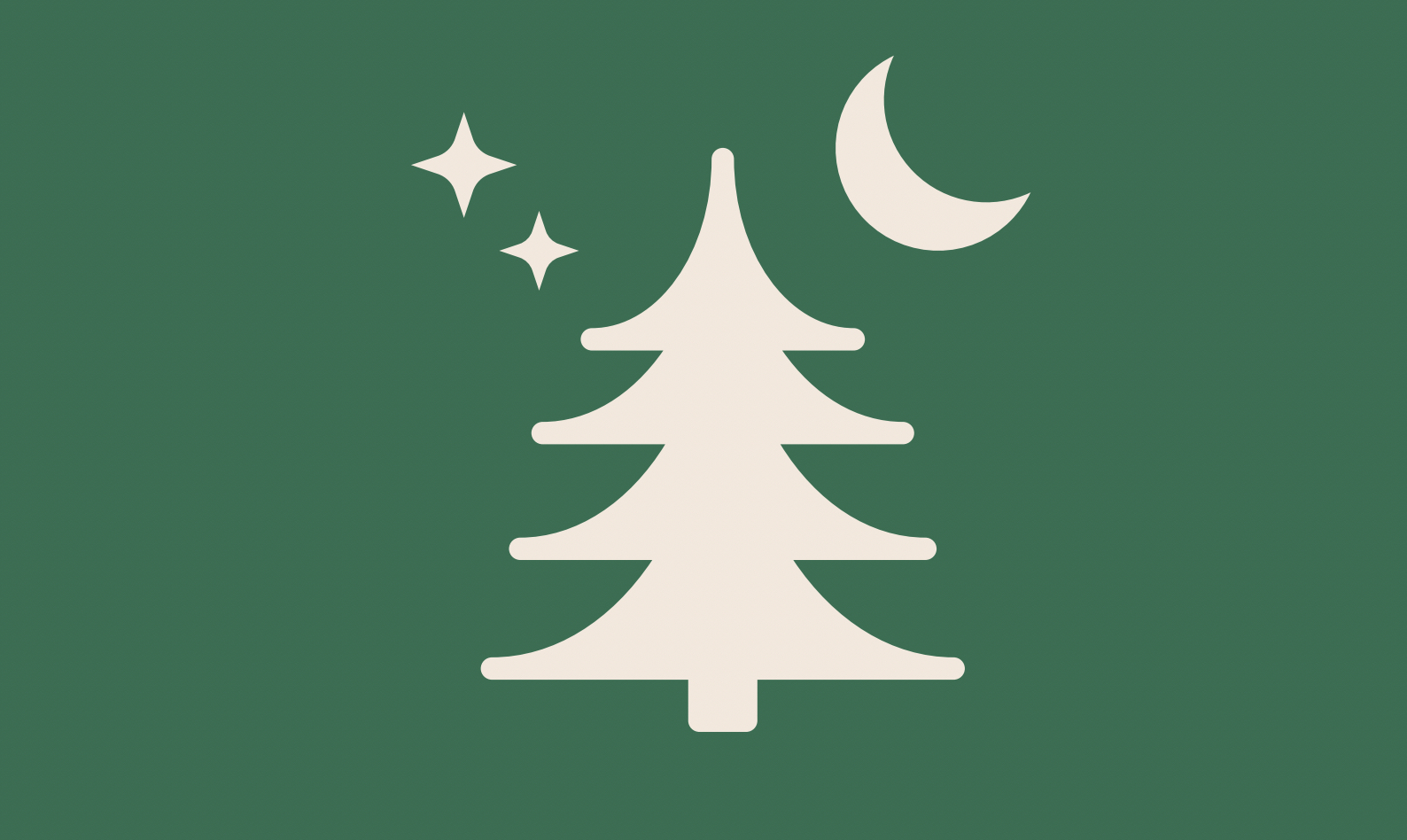
- Flag
- Motto: Ad Lumen Ignis
- Location within the state of Maine
- Coordinates: 44°17′53.6″N 69°0′44.8″W
- Country: United States
- State: Maine
- County: Knox
- Founded: 1955
- Elevation: 105 ft (32 m)
- Time zone: UTC-5 (Eastern (EST))
  - Summer (DST): UTC-4 (EDT)
- ZIP code: 04849
- Area code: 207
- FIPS code: 23-80880
- GNIS feature ID: 0582796
- Website: www.campdeforest.com

Camp DeForest is a co-ed family summer camp located in Lincolnville, Maine. It is an ACA (American Camp Association) member camp. Originally established as a co-educational summer camp in 1955, it operated as a camp for more than two decades before closing in the 1970s. The property was subsequently repurposed for seasonal lodging and later redeveloped and reopened in 2025 with mixed-use hospitality and outdoor programming. The camp historically emphasized aquatics, nature study, and outdoorsmanship. It is now open year round and programming includes winter activities onsite and locally.

== History ==
=== Founding and early history (1955–1976) ===
Camp DeForest opened in 1955 during a period of expansion in organized youth recreation. Its early summer programs included waterfront instruction, field games, crafts, and evening campfire gatherings typical of mid-20th-century summer camps.

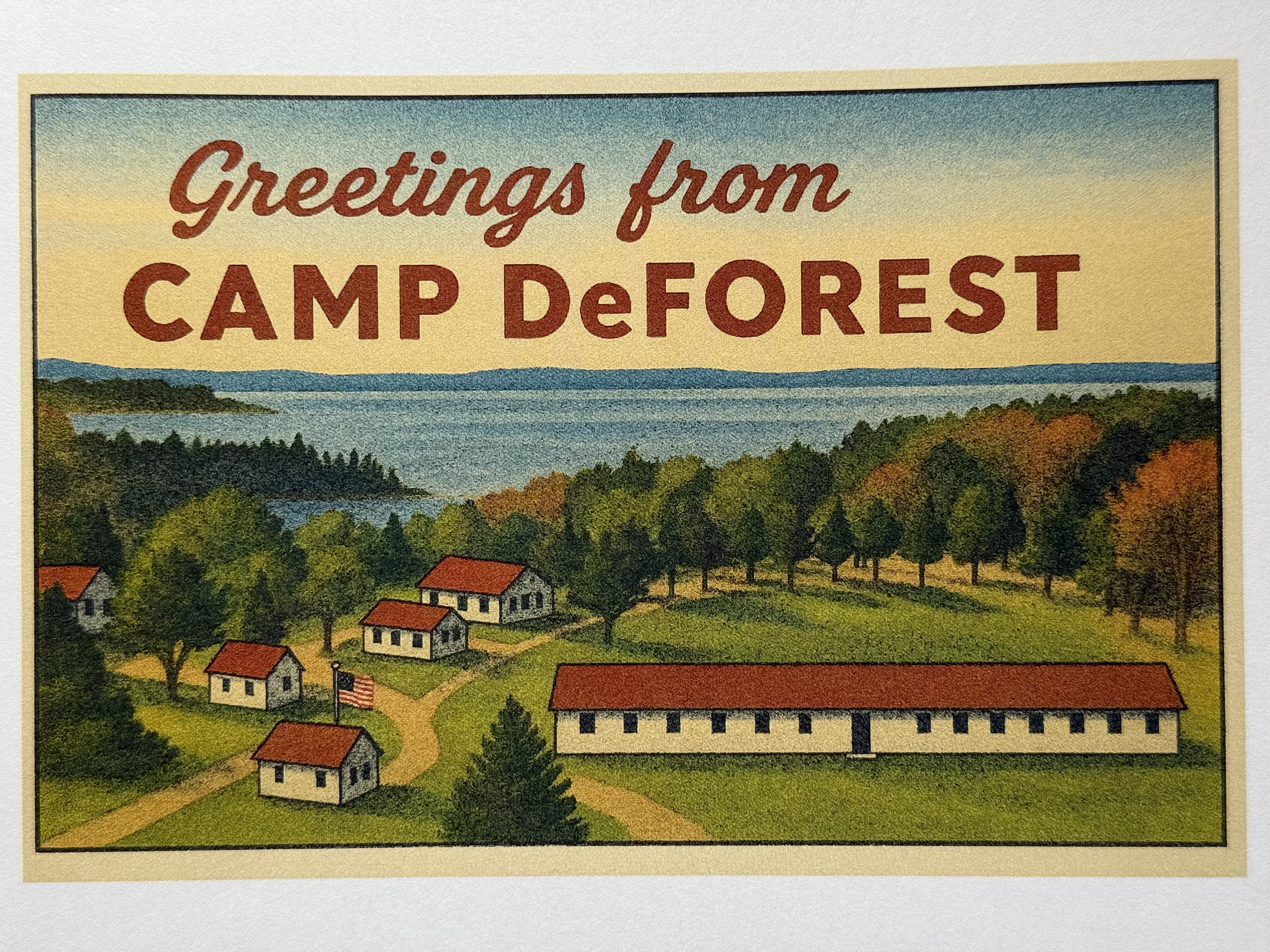
Camp DeForest Postcard, circa 1961

The camp's routines (flag ceremony, song-fest assembly, "good-night" rituals) were designed to mirror those of 4-H camps, including standardized assemblies, flag raising/lowering, and end-of-day ceremonies.

The camp operated for two decades, serving hundreds of campers each summer with a traditional program of swimming, hiking, crafts, drama, and community life. Enrollment declined in the early 1970s, and the original camp ceased operations due to shifting vacation patterns, rise of new youth programs, and long-term financial strain in Maine's mid-coast region following Hurricane Donna and Hurricane Gerda's impact in the 1960s. Following closure, the site's structures were adapted for lodging while retaining elements of their camp-era architecture.

=== Conversion to hotel (1970s–2022) ===
Following closure in the mid-1970s, cabin rows and the mess hall were adapted for seasonal lodging while retaining vernacular camp architecture typical of Maine's sporting-camp tradition.

=== Re-opening (2025– ) ===
In 2025, after a redesign, the property was re-opened as Camp DeForest, with programming including campfire socials, flag-raising, and lawn games. The relaunch draws on Maine's "Vacationland" identity. As part of the renovation, historic structures were refurbished.

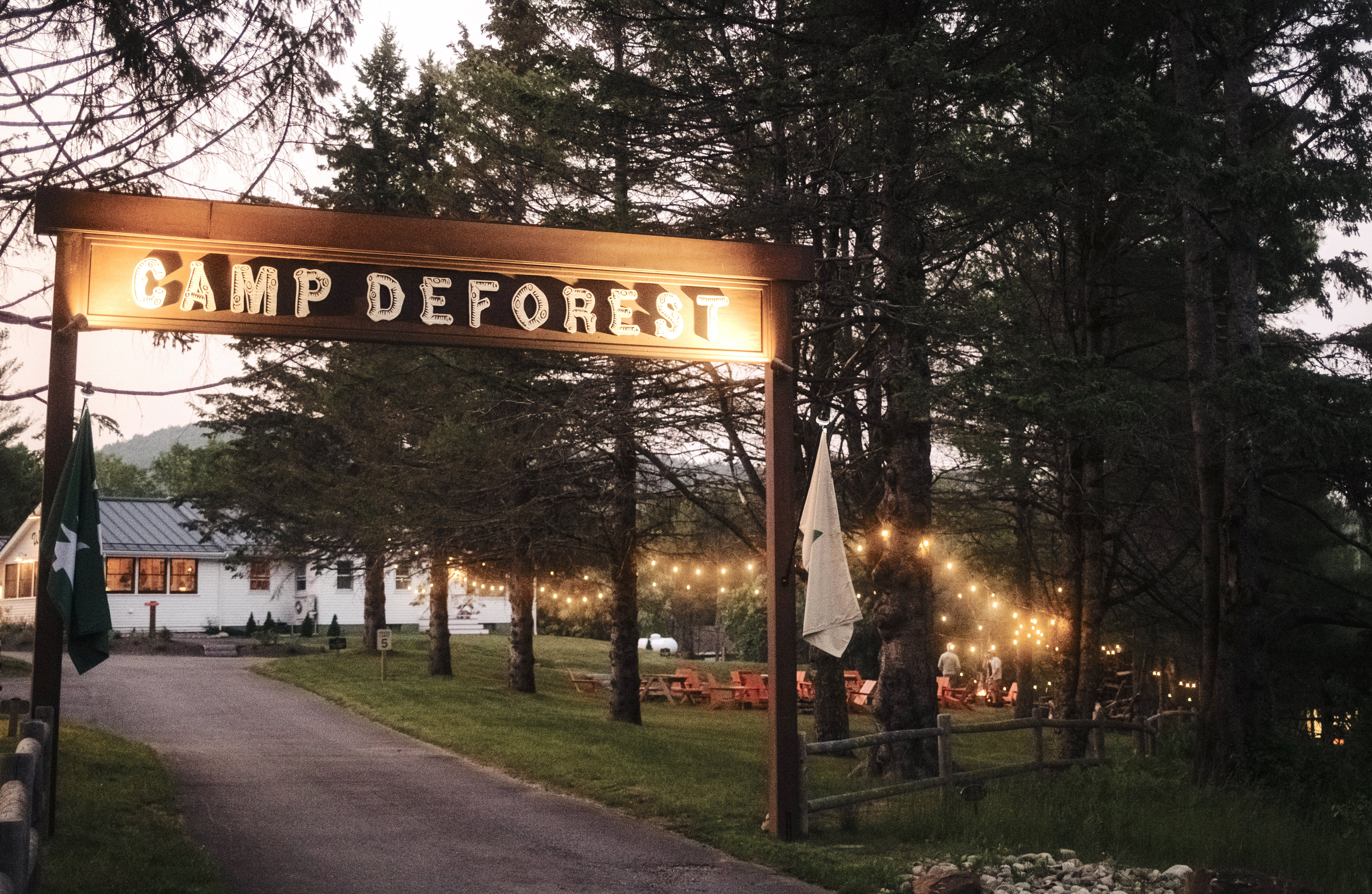
Entry to Camp DeForest in Lincolnville, Maine, circa 2025

== Facilities and program ==
The mid-century facilities comprised:

- 10–12 bunk cabins with screened windows
- A central mess lodge and assembly flagpole
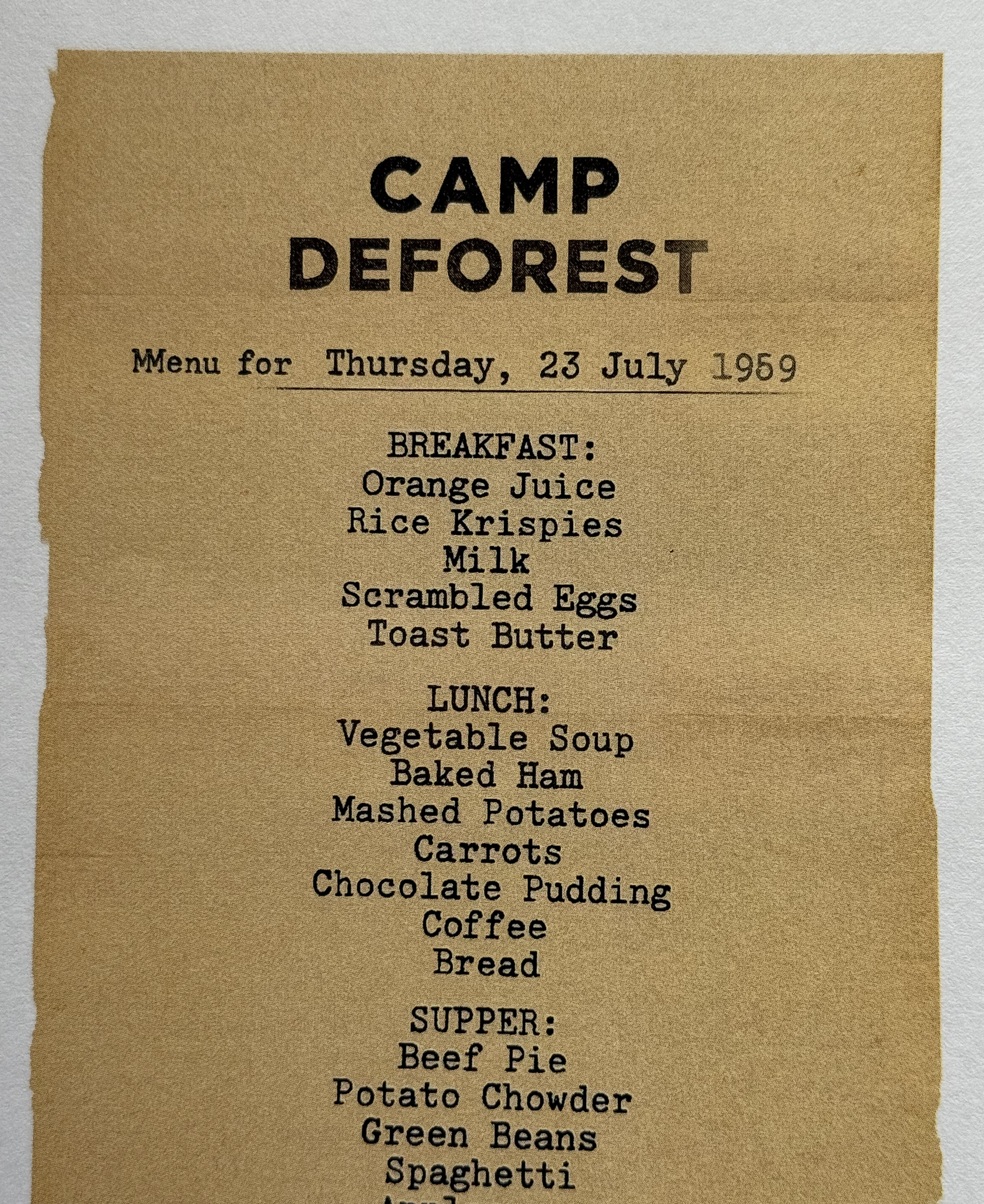
  Camp DeForest Mess hall menu, circa 1959
- Outdoor amphitheater
- Small riding ring (added early 1960s)

Today, Camp DeForest also has an overnight and day-trip program, including trips to Mount Desert Island, Mount Katahdin, the Allagash River, the Kennebec River, and Montreal.

== Traditions ==
- Flag & Song – Morning assembly with flag raising, announcements, and communal singing.
- Lantern Night – A bay side ceremony with floating lanterns.
- Pinecone Games – Cabin-vs-cabin field day.
- Song-fest & Vespers – Evening folk music and reflection.

The camp colors are forest green and orange.

== Regional context ==
Camp DeForest sits at the mouth of the Ducktrap River in Maine's Mid Coast, a region known for its bays, islands, and hill country walking (e.g., Camden Hills State Park), and for its network of youth camps and family resorts.

Maine's sporting-camp traditions of lakefront compound layouts, dock systems, guide boats, and communal dining halls influenced Camp DeForest's site plan and later hotel conversion.

== See also ==
- Summer camps
- American Camping Association
