= Garrett Conover and Alexandra Conover Bennett =

Wilderness guides

Garrett and Alexandra Conover have been professional canoe and snowshoe guides since 1980. They are American authors and registered Maine Guides, who have specialized in traditional wilderness travelling techniques of the boreal north woods.

== Background ==
=== Alexandra ===
In 1977 Alexandra received a degree in Human Ecology from College of the Atlantic. She handcrafts North Woods paddles, based on a pattern used in this region for over 100 years. When not guiding, Alexandra enjoys her musical pastimes by playing, composing, and performing on piano, accordion, and autoharp.

=== Garrett ===
Garrett studied wildlife biology and creative writing at University of Montana, and graduated from College of the Atlantic. He has extensively studied the ecology and ethnology of the boreal regions and northern travel skills. A talented photographer, Garrett's slide shows are in demand by many museums, colleges, corporations, nature centers, and other organizations.

== North Woods Ways ==
Before founding North Woods Ways in 1980, the Conovers had the good fortune of an extended apprenticeship with renowned Maine Guide "Mick" Fahey and have refined their skills by living in Canada with several indigenous families in the bush.

The Conovers have specialized in using traditional wood/canvas canoes with handmade paddles of ash for summer travel, and ash/rawhide snowshoes and handcrafted wood toboggans and canvas heated tents for winter travel. In an age given to the use of ever higher technology, they have chosen to employ, where possible, the more efficient and reliable materials developed by generations of woods travelers. Practicing what they preach, the Conovers live in the North Maine woods in a permanent walled tent.

== Books ==
Garrett's first book, Beyond the Paddle, was released in 1991. This guide to the skills of poling, lining, portaging, and ice maneuvering is praised as the first and only of its kind to provide clear, precise, and detailed explanations of these techniques used by wilderness canoeists.

A Snow Walker's Companion was written with Alexandra in 1995 and quickly became an authoritative text on winter travel. The book was reprinted in 2001 as The Winter Wilderness Companion, and in 2005 A Snow Walker's Companion: Winter Camping Skills for the North was republished to include an insert about Garrett and Alexandra's epic 350 mile snowshoe trip across the Ungava Peninsula, Quebec.

In 2006 Garrett published his first novel, Kristin's Wilderness: A Braided Trail. This story of a girl growing up among wilderness researchers earned several prestigious awards, including the Lupine Award of the Maine Library Association, the Independent Publishers Association's National Bronze Medal, the Midwest Independent Publishers Association Top Honor, and the bronze medal in the Young Adult category of The Moonbeam Awards.

=== Booklist ===
- Beyond the Paddle - A Canoeist's Guide to Expedition Skills: Poling, Lining, Portaging and Maneuvering through Ice - Garrett Conover (1991)
- A Snow Walker's Companion - Alexandra & Garrett Conover (1995)
- The Winter Wilderness Companion (reissue of A Snow Walker's Companion) - Alexandra & Garrett Conover (2001)
- A Snow Walker's Companion: Winter Camping Skills for the North – revised, Alexandra & Garrett Conover (2005)
- Kristin's Wilderness: A Braided Trail - Garrett Conover (2006)

=== Books that include contributions from the Conovers ===
- On Wilderness – voices of Maine; essay by Garrett Conover
- Wildness Within, Wildness Without; chapter by Garrett Conover

== Television guest appearances ==
- Maine Magazine with Russ Ottey - WCBB-TV (1985)
- Evening Magazine with Barry Nolan - WBZ-TV (1985)
- Made in Maine with Lou McNally - Maine Public Broadcasting Network (1992)
- Made in Maine with Lou McNally - Maine Public Broadcasting Network (1993)
- Color Me Green with Bill Green - WCSH-TV (1994)
- Winter Camping Studio Interviews - WABI-TV (1995)
- Bill Green's Maine - WCSH-TV (2005)

== Books that include features about the Conovers ==
- America's Wild and Scenic Rivers - National Geographic (1983)
- A Canoeist's Sketchbook - Robert Kimber (1991)
- Through the Woods: A Journey through America's Forests - Gary Ferguson (1997)
- The American Wilderness - Stephen Gorman (1999)
- Northern Wilds: Journeys of Discovery in the Northern Forest - Stephen Gorman (2002)
- Living Wild and Domestic: The Education of a Hunter-Gardener - Robert Kimber (2002)
- Vanishing America - James Conaway (2007)

== Notable magazine features ==
- Snow Country – article; Sometimes Life Isn't Weird Enough (1990)
- GQ (1993)
- Yankee – article; Bragging Cold (1995)
- Outside (magazine) – Profiled in article; The Great Ones: 20th Century Heroes for a New Millennium (1999)
- National Geographic Traveler – article; Call of the Loon (2001)
- National Geographic Traveler – article; Lake Onawa in winter (2008)

== See also ==
- Ernest Thompson Seton
- Bill Mason
