= Henry Patrick McKenney =

H.P. McKenney
- McKenney's log sluice around 1900
- Born: Henry Patrick McKenney; January 18, 1863; Moose River, Maine, US
- Died: January 9, 1942 (aged 78); Jackman, Maine, US
- Occupation(s): lumberman, woodsman, businessman
- Spouse(s): Elizabeth Ann Hughey (m. July 11, 1885)
- Children: Della I. McKenney (1886–1918); James B. McKenney (b. 1890; m. Beatrice McCollar); Ella M. McKenney (b. 1893; m. Fred S. Moore); Louisa McKenney (d. in infancy); Elsie McKenney (b. 1900)
- Parent(s): Patrick McKenney (b. 1822; immigrated 1845 from Ireland); Lovinia Newton (b. 1832; Maine)

Henry Patrick “H.P.” McKenney (January 18, 1863 – January 9, 1942) was an American woodsman, lumberman, outdoor enthusiast, and businessman who served as the fire warden in Jackman, Maine in 1912. He was the owner of several logging and sporting camps in the area including Bulldog Camps and Lake Parlin House. He is noted for his work ethic, business savvy, and stubbornness that often attributed to his success. Born into a large family in Jackman, McKenney was the eighth of thirteen children and often embraced the strenuous life that came with living in rural Maine in the nineteenth century. He was home-schooled and became an eager student of the outdoors. He began logging at an early age and truly made a name for himself in 1898 when he built a successful mile and quarter long log sluice on Enchanted Pond, then referred to as “Bulldog Pond”.

== Siblings ==
- James (1848–1897)
- Edward (1850–1933)
- Lydia Annie (1852–1896)
- Elsie/Elsa (1854–1919)
- Katherine (1856–1934)
- Philander (1858–1932)
- Lovinia (b.1860)
- Lorinda (b.1865)
- Rosanna (1866–1934)
- Mary P. (b.1868)
- Mabel (1870–1950)
- Elizabeth (1872–1950)
