= Camp Phoenix (Maine) =

Camp in Northeast Piscataquis, Maine

Coordinates: 46.0386°N 69.0708°W

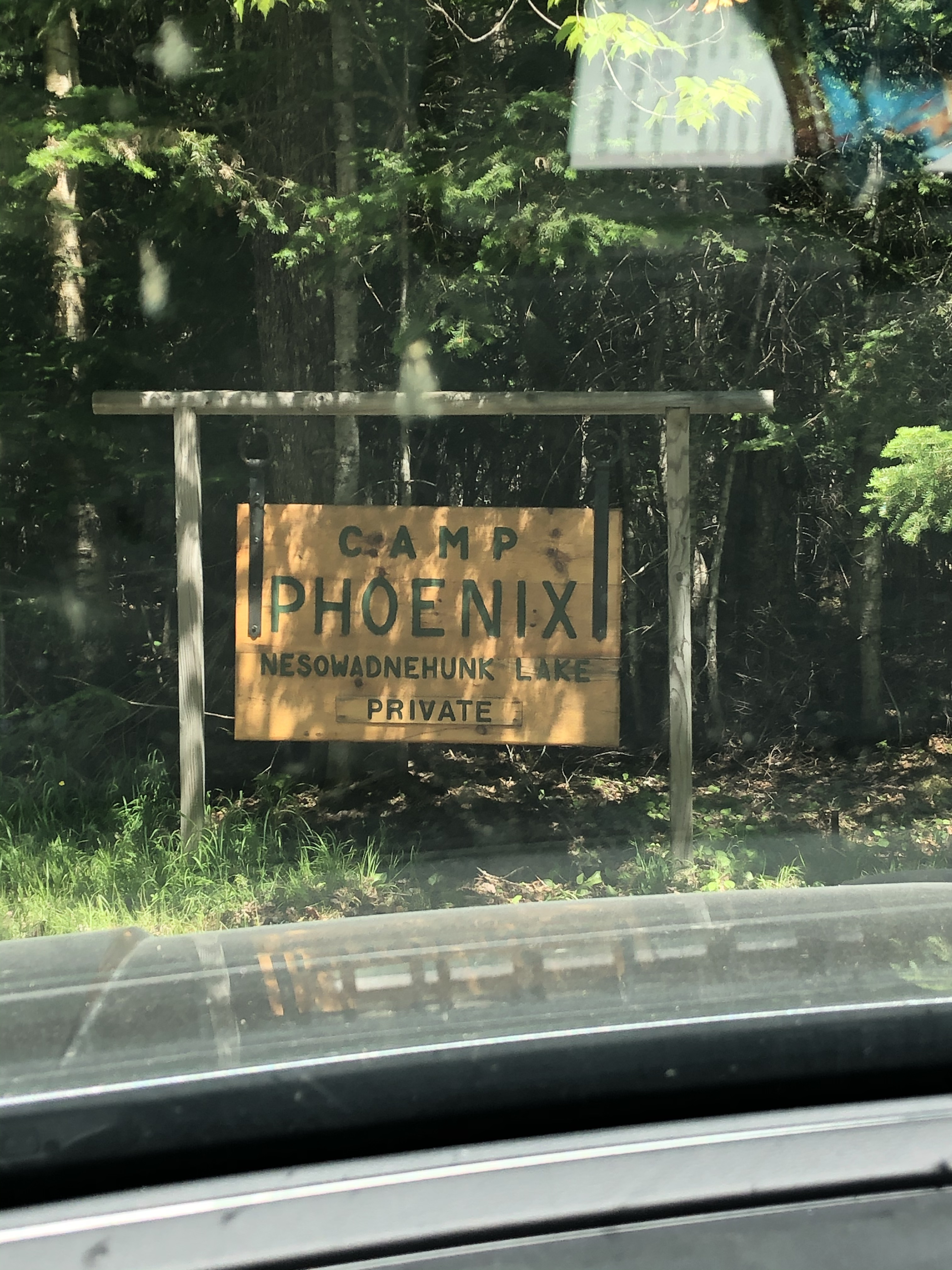
The sign at the entrance of Camp Phoenix

Camp Phoenix is a sixteen-acre plot of land located along the western edge of Baxter State Park in Northeast Piscataquis, Maine. Originally a sporting camp, the cabins are now privately owned.

== History ==
Fifty-four year-old Albert McLain and his thirty-year-old son Will built a trapper's cabin near the outlet of Nesowadnehunk (Sourdnahunk) lake in 1895. A year later they abandoned that and built a "sporting camp"—a building with a kitchen and dining room on the ground floor and lodgings on the second—on the east shore of the lake about a mile north of the outlet. They named it Camp Phoenix. By 1898 newspapers were beginning to take notice of the quality of the fishing and hunting there. By 1900 Albert was running a sporting camp in Chesuncook township, Piscataquis county, and Will McLain was working as a common laborer about 18 miles away in Township 4, Range 10, of the same county.

Charles Daisey bought McLain's building from him sometime between 1900 and 1904 and built eight cabins close to the lake shore using logs laid horizontally, probably between 1910 and 1920. During the 1920s, he worked to keep the resort isolated in order to preserve its rustic appeal for the loyal clientele he was building. Though a road was built from the town of Greenville northward toward the lake in 1922, it stopped about five miles away. He built his own private, primitive road to the public road and locked a chain across where they met. A telephone shed built there allowed guests to call for admittance and garages were ready there to house their cars. At first, a horse-drawn buckboard would pick up the guests and bring them to the lodge but later this was upgraded to beach wagons. Charles himself was forward-thinking enough to buy an REO Speedwagon (the earliest form of pickup truck) in the year the road was built, in order to pick up supplies from town but motorized vehicles were forbidden to guests, including boats. The only watercraft he allowed were canoes built by his son Arnold and only fly fishing was allowed. Arnold, who would make a career of the camp, began replacing some of the cabins with ones built of logs placed vertically in the 1920s and 1930s. In October 1931 a fire that began around the stovepipe in his room in the main lodge burned it to the ground, but he was able to build a new lodge, of vertically placed logs, before the next season's guests arrived.

When Charles bought the McLain building, the land did not come with it. This he leased over the next three decades from a succession of owners and by 1937 he had saved up enough money to buy the twenty acres under the camp, preserving it from being merged into Baxter State Park in the coming decades. However, locals were not pleased with Charles' chain keeping them away from a public lake. By 1942 public pressure forced him to remove his protective barrier, and when people began running motorboats on the lake he retired. Arnold ran the camp for another thirteen years, but he sold it in 1955.

George and Beryl Emerson bought the camp in that transaction. They refurbished the shopworn cabins, painted them and the lodge red and dug a lagoon to shelter the motorboats now in use on the lake. They sold the camp in 1971 when Baxter State Park became more popular as a public recreation area, drawing in more of the middle classes and ending the era of a camp for chauffeur-driven elites. A series of owners bought and sold the camp during the 1970s and 1980s. Charles Daisey's insistence on keeping the lake isolated and protected from modern machinery and restricting fishing to fly fishing only began a tradition that kept the lake such a favorable environment for its native brook trout that the State of Maine found the lake did not need stocking with hatchery fish and recommended maintaining it that way.

The last owners of the 1980s sold the camp and a group of developers wanted to replace the cabins with condominiums. However, the motorized equipment necessary for the construction were too tall and wide to legally travel the roads passing through Baxster State Park, thwarting the plan before it started. Instead, the local building regulations committee issued permits for individual seasonal residences. An owners' association formed which sought to preserve the quality of the natural environment around the lake.

== Camp Phoenix Surroundings ==
Location of Nesowadenhunk Lake

Phoenix sits at the southeast shore of Nesowadnehunk lake, the largest fly fishing-only lake in Maine. On all its other sides it is bordered by Baxter State Park.
