= Mount Chase, Maine =

Town in Maine, United States

- Town
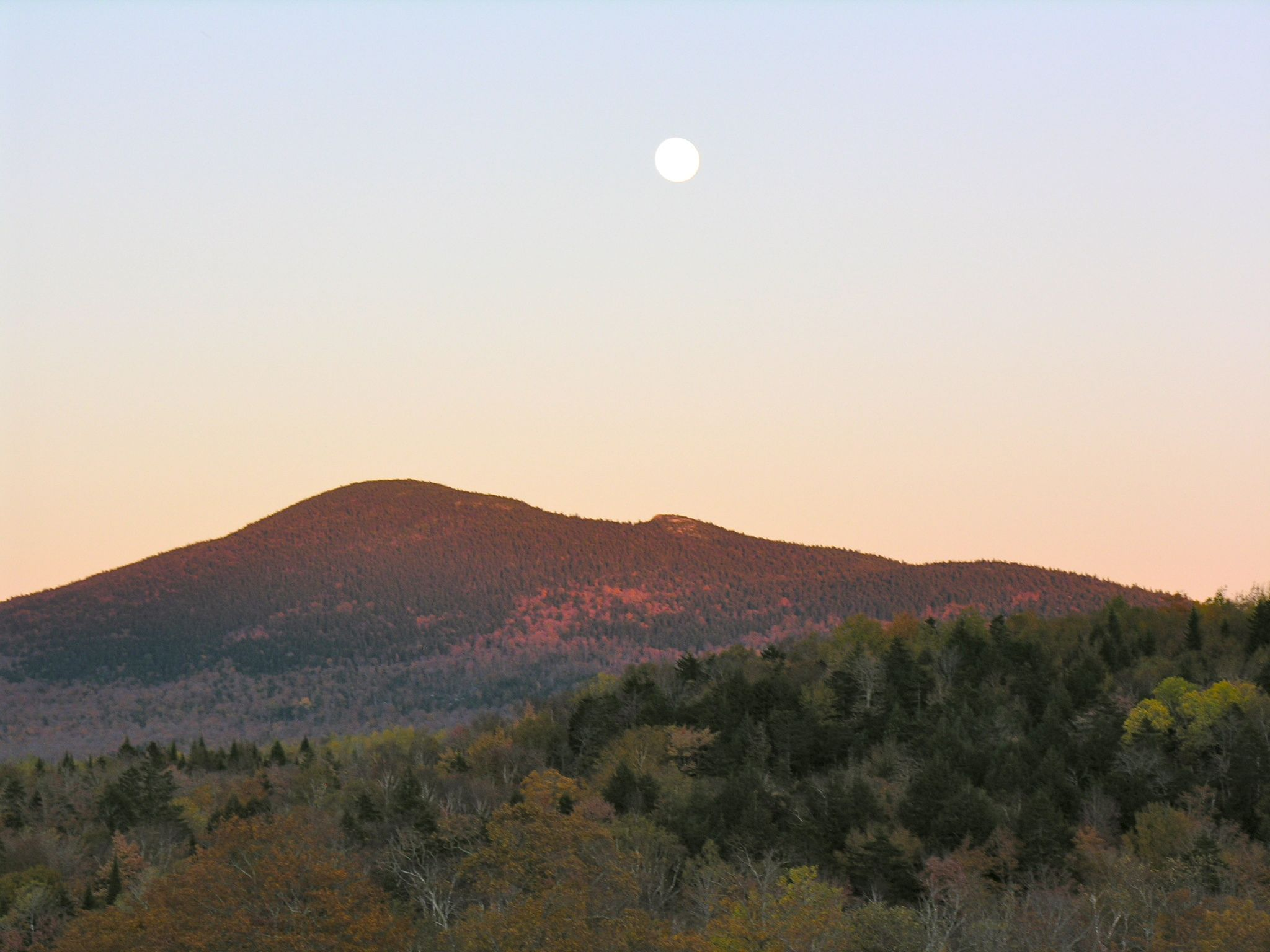
- Mount Chase at Sunset

- Location within Maine Location within the United States
- Coordinates: 46°05′37″N 68°30′36″W
- Country: United States
- State: Maine
- County: Penobscot

Area
  - Total: 37.73 sq mi (97.72 km^{2})
  - Land: 36.65 sq mi (94.92 km^{2})
  - Water: 1.08 sq mi (2.80 km^{2})
- Elevation: 883 ft (269 m)

Population (2020)
  - Total: 187
  - Density: 5.2/sq mi (2/km^{2})
- Time zone: UTC-5 (Eastern (EST))
  - Summer (DST): UTC-4 (EDT)
- ZIP code: 04765
- Area code: 207
- FIPS code: 23-47560
- GNIS feature ID: 582610

Mount Chase is a town in Penobscot County, Maine, United States. The population was 187 at the 2020 census.

== Geography ==
According to the United States Census Bureau, the town has a total area of 37.73 square miles (97.72 km^{2}), of which 36.65 square miles (94.92 km^{2}) is land and 1.08 square miles (2.80 km^{2}) is water. The surrounding area is heavily forested. The community is situated 10 miles from Patten and 15 miles from the north entrance to Baxter State Park. Mount Katahdin is visible from many locations.

=== Mount Chase ===
Mount Chase is a peak of volcanic origin with an elevation of 2440 feet.

=== Upper Shin Pond ===
Upper Shin Pond is a large lake of 544 acres with a maximum depth of 64 feet.

=== Lower Shin Pond ===
Lower Shin Pond is a large lake measuring 560 acres with a maximum depth of 25 feet.

== History ==
The land surrounding Mt. Katahdin is believed to have been utilized by Penobscot and Wolastoqiyik for thousands of years. Local names for peaks, waterways, and other landmarks reflect this heritage.

The town of Mount Chase acquired its name from its prominent mountain peak, described above. Its first permanent residents are dated to 1838, although two families are included in the 1837 Maine Census. In 1860 the population was 250, and in 1862 it was organized and renamed the Mount Chase Plantation. On March 2, 1864, it became the town of Mount Chase. In 1880 it had 310 residents; in 1900 there were 299.

In the aftermath of the American Civil War, the railroad extended its lines along the Penobscot River from Bangor to Mattawamkeag. An 1882 history described Mount Chase as located "on the stage line from the European & North American Railroad at Mattawamkeag to Fort Kent in the extreme north of the State, on the St John." Residents and tourists could now take advantage of the 50-mile stage route from Mattawamkeag to Mount Chase, and supplies could be shipped in and goods or wild game out more readily.

== Hotels and sporting camps ==
=== Shin Pond House/Shin Pond Village ===
The Shin Pond House was established in the 1870s by Charles H. Sibley and was initially Mount Chase's only hotel. The next hotel keeper was Ted Crommett. The original Shin Pond House burned and was rebuilt in 1912 by Zenas L. Harvey, who added cabins to the lodging options. After a fire in 1949, Arthur and Edna Augustine purchased the property and built a new Shin Pond House. After their tenure, the building was destroyed by another fire in 1979. In the early 1980s Craig and Terry Hill envisioned a recreational resort on the former Shin Pond House site, called the Shin Pond Village. They built a general store, public laundry and public showers. Campsites and guest suites were added, along with new cabins.

=== Point-of-Pines Camps ===
Point-of-Pines Camps was created on Upper Shin Pond and operated by G. F. Root. In 1952 it was included in a survey of Maine wilderness sporting camps, though described as "less wilderness in concept and category."

=== Mt. Chase Lodge ===
Mt. Chase Lodge was established in 1960 on Upper Shin Pond as a recreational sporting lodge. Since 1976 Rick and Sara Hill have operated the lodge.

=== Driftwood Lodge and Camps ===
The Driftwood Lodge and camps is located on the east side of Upper Shin Pond. It is managed by Paul and Tracy Reed and features a guide service for bear hunters.

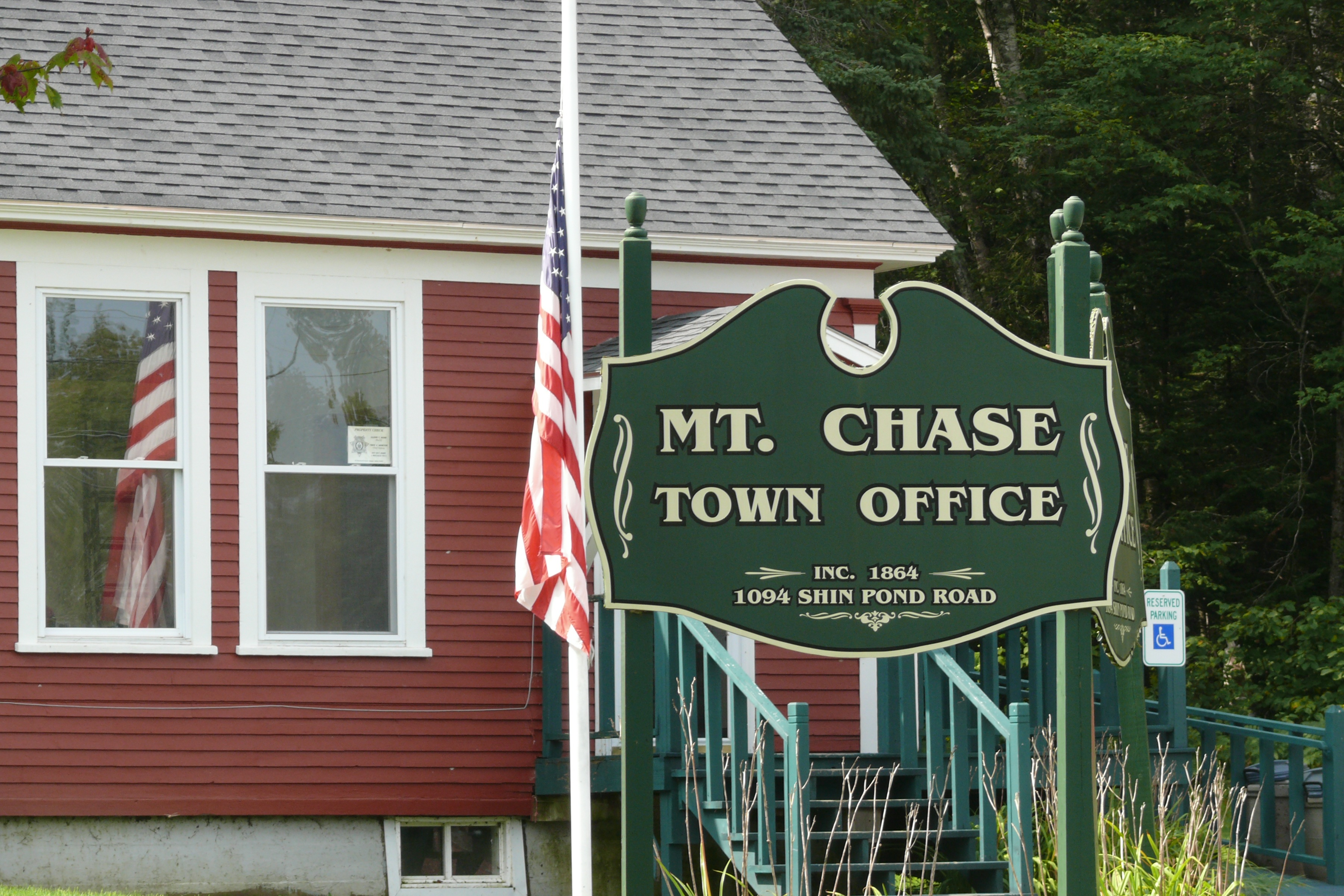
Mount Chase Town Office

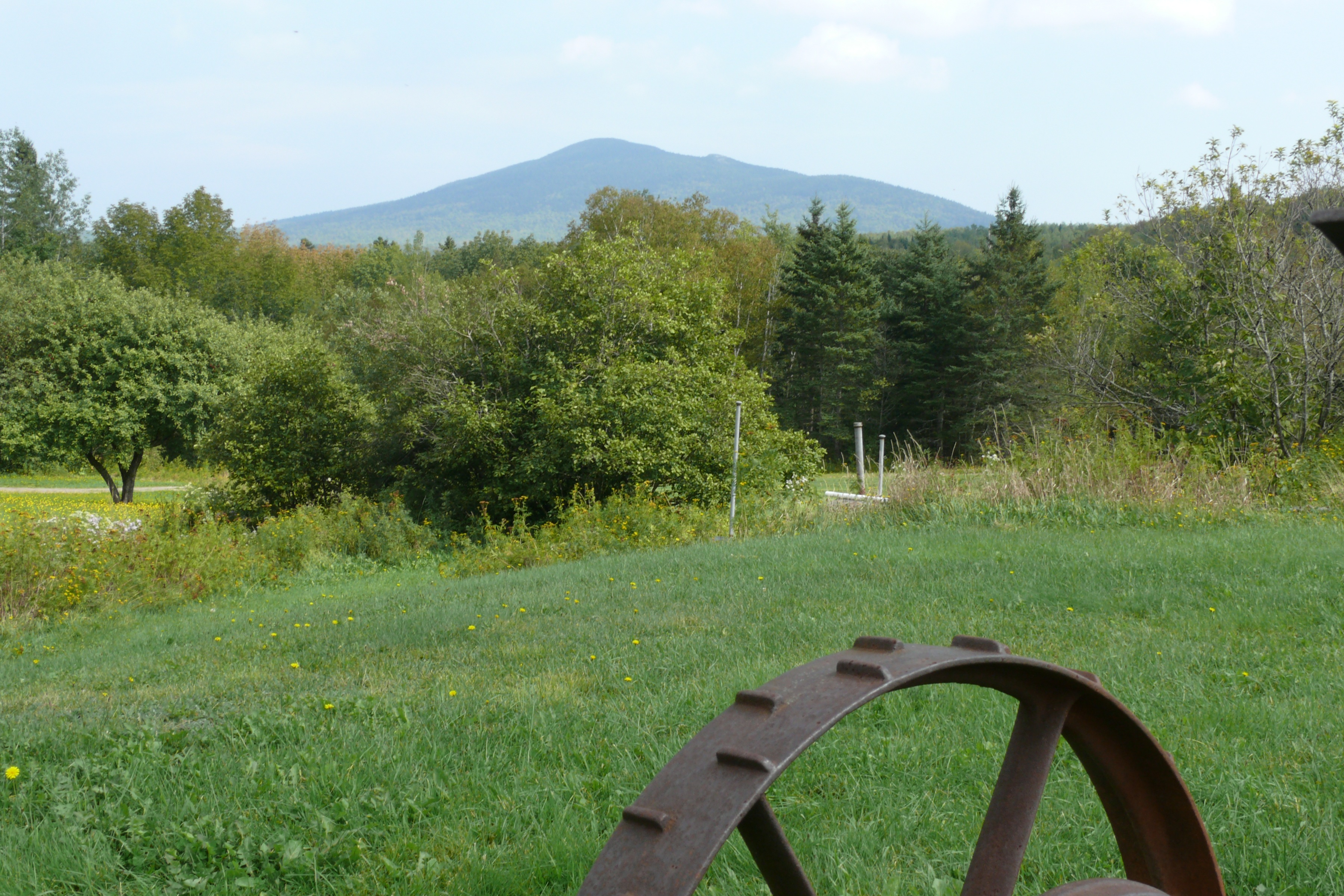
View of Mt. Chase

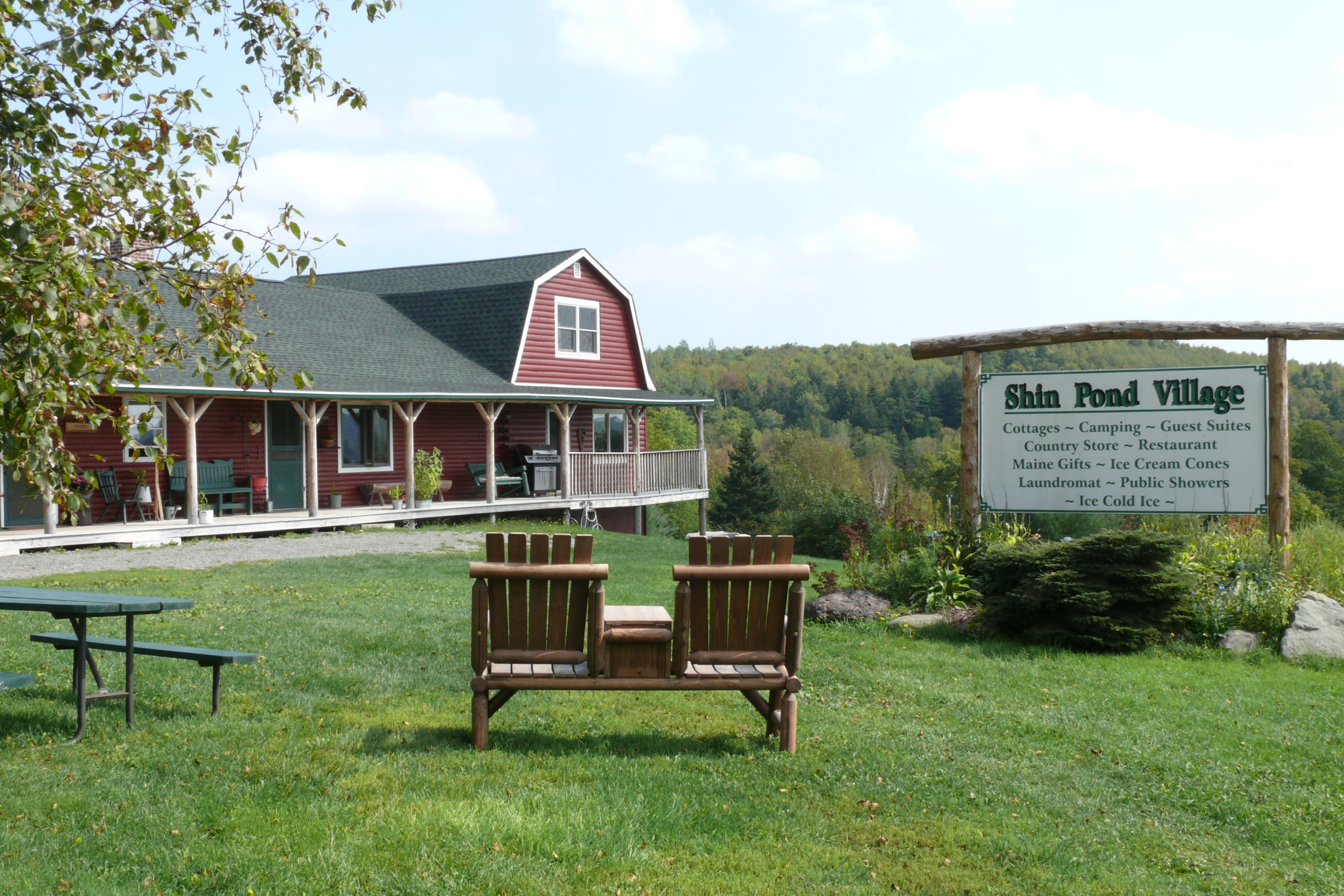
Shin Pond Village

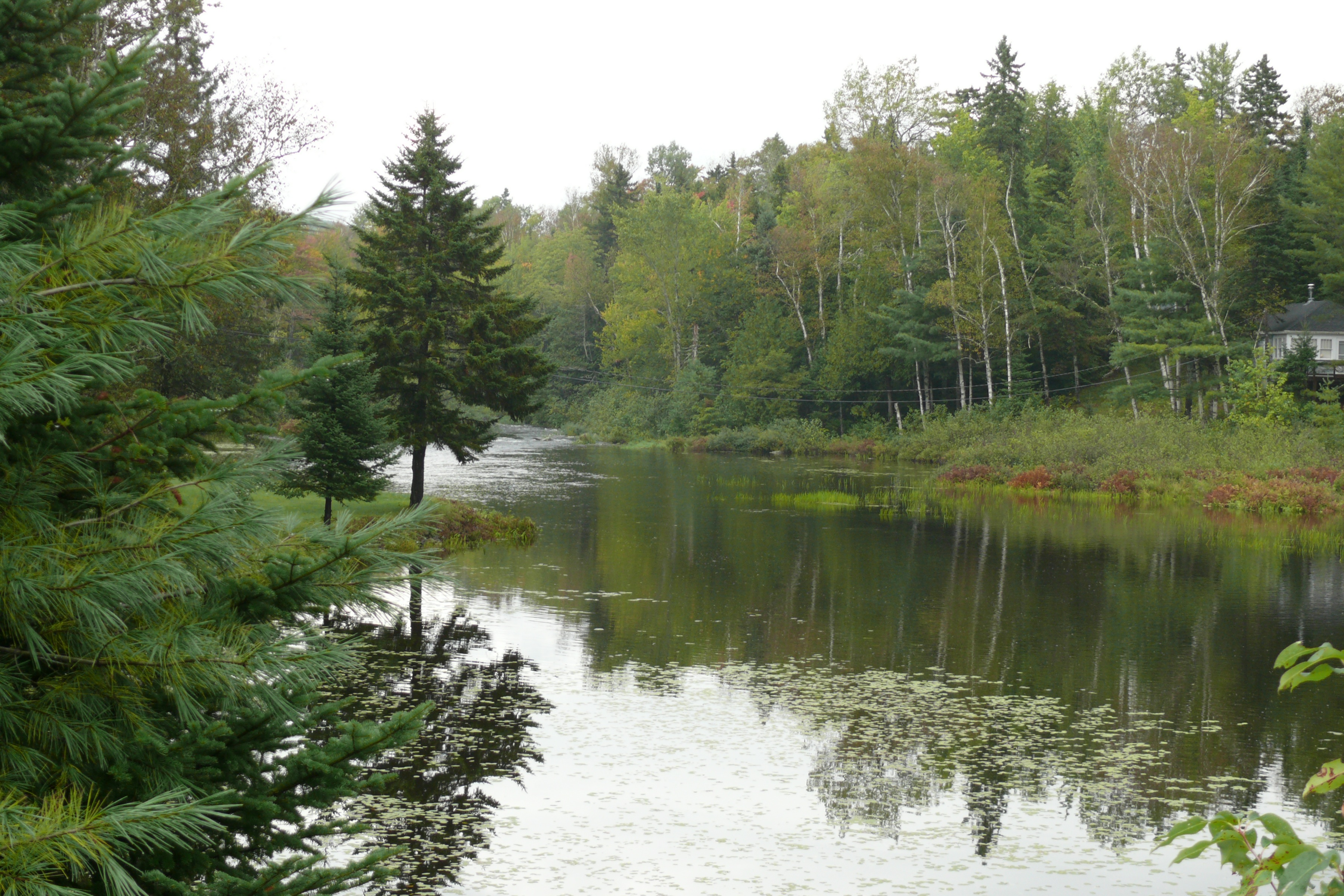
Upper Shin Pond

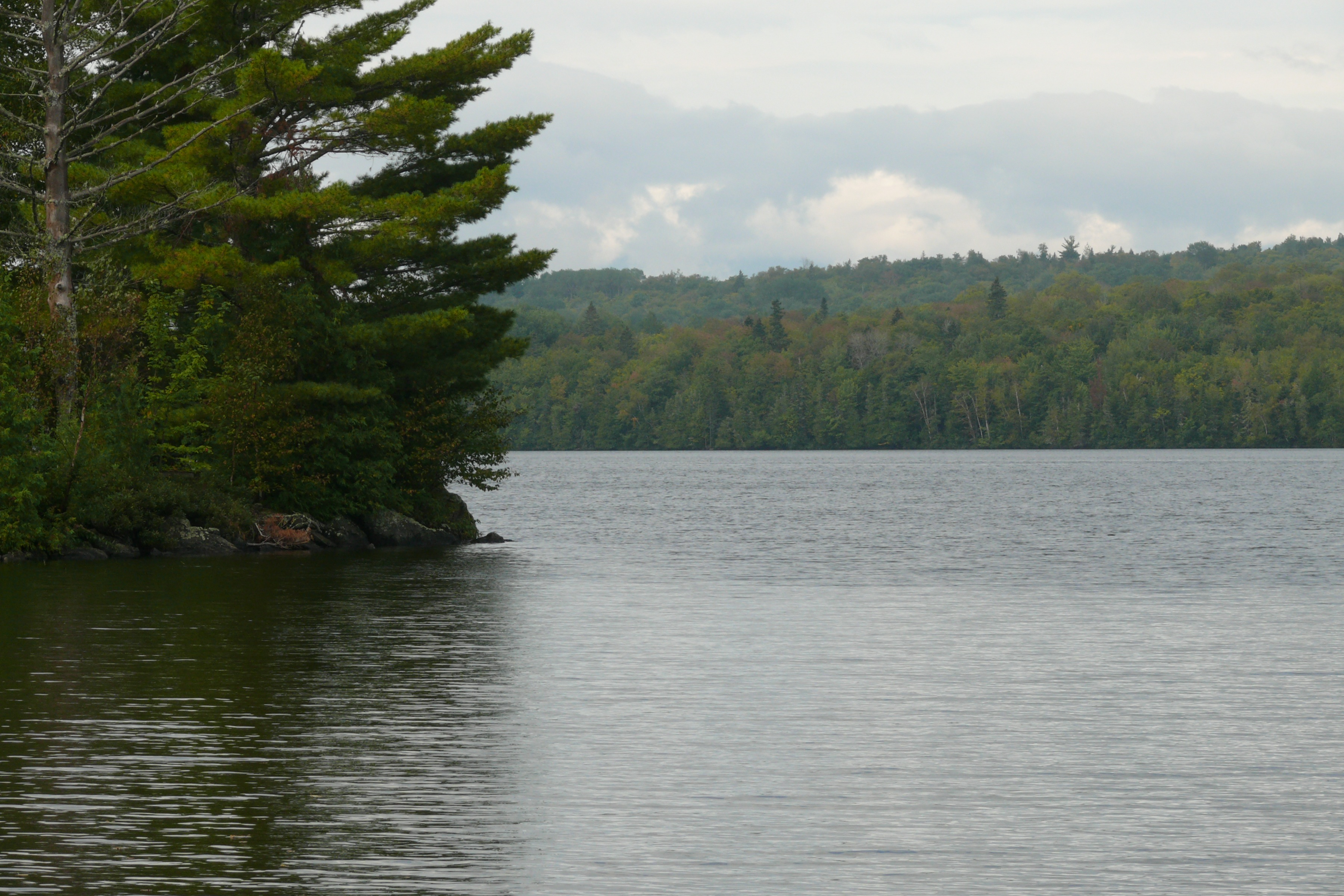
Lower Shin Pond

== Economy and industries ==
Early workers were attracted to the Mount Chase area for opportunities working for lumber companies. In 1881, A Gazetteer of the State of Maine, emphasized that the area was "well wooded" and offered a saw mill on Crystal Brook at the eastern side of town. However, another contemporary work pointing out that farming was by then the major occupation of Mount Chase's inhabitants. Maintaining sporting camps and offering wilderness guide services have continued as means of support to the present time. Recent decades have seen the rise of snowmobiling as a major winter sport.

According to American Community Survey estimates, the most common industry category for Mount Chase is "agriculture, forestry, fishing and hunting, and mining," followed by "retail trade."

== Demographics ==
Historical population
Census	Pop.	Note	%±
1870	262		—
1880	310		18.3%
1890	284		−8.4%
1900	299		5.3%
1910	227		−24.1%
1920	239		5.3%
1930	210		−12.1%
1940	198		−5.7%
1950	250		26.3%
1960	179		−28.4%
1970	197		10.1%
1980	233		18.3%
1990	254		9.0%
2000	247		−2.8%
2010	201		−18.6%
2020	187		−7.0%
U.S. Decennial Census

=== 2010 census ===
As of the census of 2010, there were 201 people, 94 households, and 57 families residing in the town. The population density was 5.5 inhabitants per square mile (2.1/km^{2}). There were 297 housing units at an average density of 8.1 per square mile (3.1/km^{2}). The racial makeup of the town was 96.0% White, 0.5% African American, 3.0% Asian, and 0.5% from two or more races. Hispanic or Latino of any race were 0.5% of the population.

There were 94 households, of which 20.2% had children under the age of 18 living with them, 58.5% were married couples living together, 1.1% had a female householder with no husband present, 1.1% had a male householder with no wife present, and 39.4% were non-families. 33.0% of all households were made up of individuals, and 12.8% had someone living alone who was 65 years of age or older. The average household size was 2.14 and the average family size was 2.72.

The median age in the town was 50.1 years. 18.4% of residents were under the age of 18; 3.1% were between the ages of 18 and 24; 17% were from 25 to 44; 41.3% were from 45 to 64; and 20.4% were 65 years of age or older. The gender makeup of the town was 55.2% male and 44.8% female.

=== 2000 census ===
As of the census of 2000, there were 247 people, 104 households, and 76 families residing in the town. The population density was 6.8 people per square mile (2.6/km^{2}). There were 238 housing units at an average density of 6.6 per square mile (2.5/km^{2}). The racial makeup of the town was 98.38% White, 0.40% African American, and 1.21% from two or more races.

There were 104 households, out of which 22.1% had children under the age of 18 living with them, 68.3% were married couples living together, 1.9% had a female householder with no husband present, and 26.0% were non-families. 22.1% of all households were made up of individuals, and 11.5% had someone living alone who was 65 years of age or older. The average household size was 2.38 and the average family size was 2.73.

In the town, the population was spread out, with 17.0% under the age of 18, 8.5% from 18 to 24, 20.6% from 25 to 44, 38.5% from 45 to 64, and 15.4% who were 65 years of age or older. The median age was 46 years. For every 100 females, there were 112.9 males. For every 100 females age 18 and over, there were 118.1 males.

The median income for a household in the town was $26,705, and the median income for a family was $27,031. Males had a median income of $26,563 versus $16,458 for females. The per capita income for the town was $12,930. About 27.3% of families and 27.4% of the population were below the poverty line, including 15.2% of those under the age of eighteen and 43.6% of those 65 or over.
