= Coburn Mountain (Maine) =

Mountain in Somerset County, Maine, US

- Location within Maine

Highest point
- Elevation: 3,717 ft (1,133 m)
- Prominence: 2,497 ft (761 m)
- Listing: New England Fifty Finest #16
- Coordinates: 45°28′08″N 70°07′36″W

Geography
- Location: Somerset County, Maine, U.S.
- Topo map: USGS Enchanted Pond

Coburn Mountain is a mountain located in Somerset County, Maine.

Coburn Mtn. lies within the watershed of the Kennebec River. The northern end of the southeast side of Coburn drains into Mountain Brook, then into Cold Stream and the Kennebec River. The southern end drains into Salmon Stream, then into the Dead River, another tributary of the Kennebec River. The southwest end of Coburn drains into Enchanted Pond and Enchanted Stream, then into the Dead River. The northwest side of Coburn drains into Horse Brook and Fourmile Brook, then into the Moose River and the Kennebec. The north end of Coburn drains into Piel Brook, then into Parlin Stream and the Moose River.

== History ==
The mountain got its name from two brothers who owned and logged most of the land in the area, Philander and Abner Coburn.

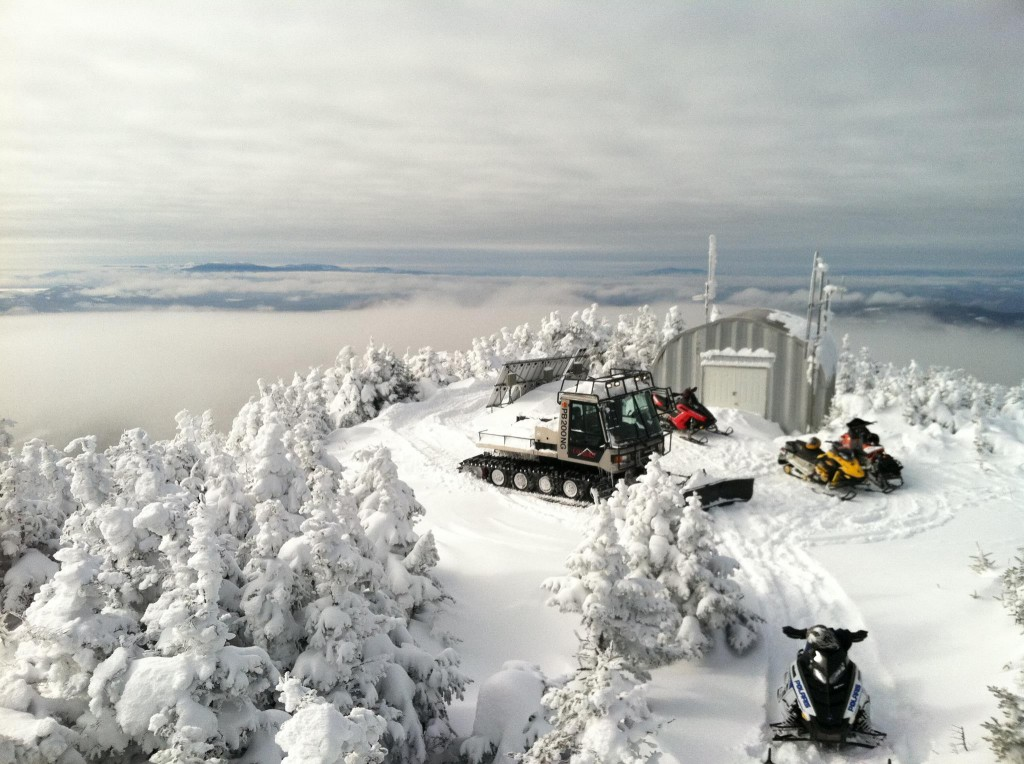
View of the Coburn Mountain Summit in winter.

== Recreation ==
At 3,717 feet above sea level, the summit of Coburn Mountain is the highest groomed snowmobile trail in the state. Currently, the club responsible for the trail's upkeep and maintenance is the Coburn Summit Riders. The trail to the summit is 2 miles long, climbing 2,500 feet. The trail is divided into two sections with a spot to turn around in between. The first section to the radio repeater tower is groomed regularly and easily doable by any rider. The final one mile from the repeater tower to the top is recommended only for experienced snowmobilers. It is a narrow, winding, steep trail which is groomed only when conditions allow. An abandoned fire tower remains on the summit providing clear 360 degree views of the area to adventurous hikers and snowmobilers.

The mountain also used to be home to the "ill-fated" Enchanted Mountain Ski Area which operated on the south facing slope from 1966 to 1974.

== See also ==
- List of mountains in Maine
- New England Fifty Finest
