= Fly Rod Crosby =

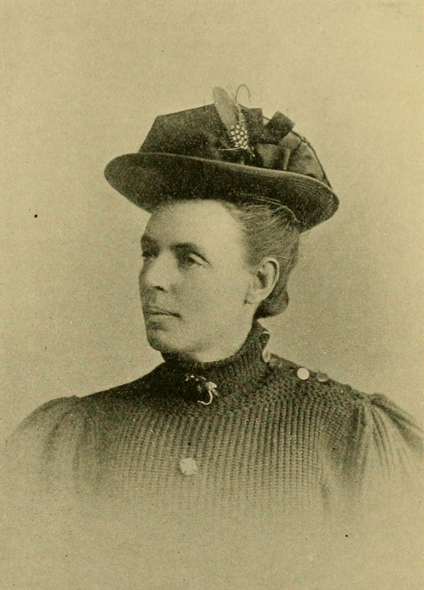
Cornelia T. Crosby

Cornelia Thurza Crosby, or "Fly Rod", as she was popularly known, was born in Phillips, Maine, on November 10, 1854. She died one day after her 92nd birthday on November 11, 1946. She was the first Registered Maine Guide.

On March 19, 1897, the Maine legislature passed a bill requiring hunting guides to register with the state. Maine registered 1316 guides in that first year. In addition to being its first licensed guide, Crosby promoted Maine's outdoor sports at shows in metropolitan areas, and wrote a popular column that appeared in many newspapers around the country, but was nationally published in the magazine "Fly Rod's Notebook". Her efforts helped to attract thousands of would-be outdoorsmen—and women—to the woods and streams of Maine. Crosby attracted generations of tourists and wilderness-visitors through her popular newspaper columns of her fishing and hunting tales in Rangeley Lake, Maine.

Crosby once stated, "I am a plain woman of uncertain age, standing six feet in my stockings...I scribble a bit for various sporting journals, and I would rather fish any day than go to heaven."

Fly Rod, as was her pseudonym on her columns, was a role model to young women around the nation, bolstering a personal philosophy of athleticism and independence not often found in other women of her time. Fly Rod was often described as having the heart of a “brave” or a Native American, as she excelled at outdoors sports. Crosby also had many friends among the Penobscot people, many of whom served as Crosby's guides in the woods.

Aside from her columns, work as a Maine Guide and fly fishing experiences, Crosby gained quite a bit of fame for her exhibit at the New York Sportsman's Exposition in 1898. At the exhibit, Crosby displayed a recreated hunting camp even with a log cabin. Throughout the duration of the exhibit, Crosby wore a “scandalously short” skirt which displays her characteristics as a woman who broke out of social norms for her time period.

In 1899, Crosby endured a knee injury that put an end to her mobility, although she continued to write her popular columns. Fly Rod Crosby lived a long life even after her injury, dying at the age of ninety-two in Lewiston, Maine. She died on November 11, 1946, Armistice Day and was buried in the Strong Village Cemetery in Strong, Maine.
