= Enchanted Mountain =

Defunct ski resort in Long Pond, Maine, United States

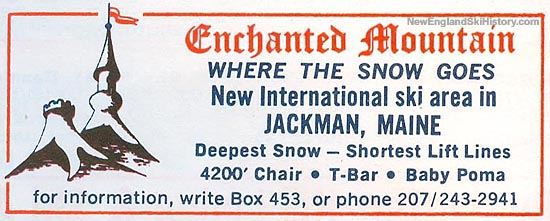

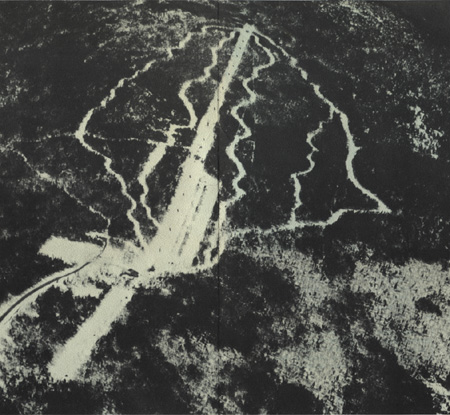
- An aerial view of Enchanted Mountain, 1968
- Interactive map of Enchanted Mountain
- Location: Coburn Mountain, Upper Enchanted Township, Maine, United States
- Nearest city: Jackman, Maine
- Coordinates: 45°27′58″N 70°7′5″W
- Top elevation: 3,200 feet (980 m)
- Base elevation: 2,200 feet (670 m)
- Trails: 8
- Lift system: 3

Enchanted Mountain was a medium-sized ski area located in Upper Enchanted Township, Maine whose isolation and strong wind conditions proved problematic for its success. The area was said to be the "Switzerland of Maine", an isolated alpine area with great views and skiing. It consisted of eight runs (2 beginner and 6 intermediate/expert) using a double chairlift, a T-bar lift, and a Poma. The remnants of the ski area remain on the southward facing slope of Coburn Mountain (el. 3,717 ft or 1,133 m), in Upper Enchanted Township where it got its namesake.

== History ==
Enchanted Mountain was designed by E.H. Lord-Wood Associates and built in 1965 by North Haven Construction Company on land that was reportedly leased from Scott Paper Company, who would later become owner of nearby Big Squaw Mountain Resort. The ski area first opened in February 1966 with two lifts: a T-bar that would serve only two trails above the base lodge that season and a baby poma lift to serve the beginner ski area below the lodge. The following year a 4,200 ft. Poma double chairlift was constructed to the summit, increasing the trail count to seven. One wide open slope was located underneath the lift with six narrower, winding trails fanning out from the top. The vertical drop was only about 1000 ft. but some brochures and guidebooks exaggerated it to as much as 1800 ft. The area boasted that it had the deepest snow and shortest lift lines. In 1968 the lifts operated daily and an adult lift ticket was only $5.50.

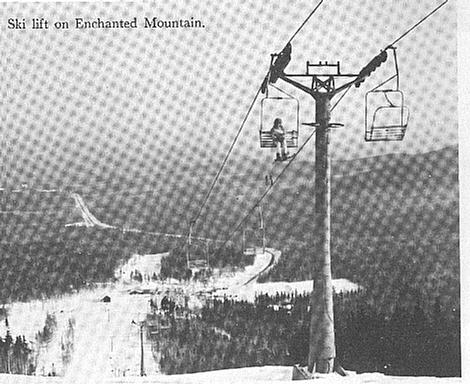
Ski lift on Enchanted Mountain, c. 1968

In 1971 the ski area had grown to include a ski school, shop, lodge, snack bar, nursery, and ski patrol, and by 1974 it had added a restaurant, rental & repair shop, warming huts and parking for up to 600 cars. It was said that the surrounding area had lodging available for over 300 people. There was no snowmaking or night skiing.

Long term plans included three more trail pods, a tramway and six more double chairlifts to cover some 14,000 acres, but after financial troubles put the ski area out of business and on the auction block in 1969, it was sold by the Small Business Administration to three private owners: Willis & Robert LeFavour and Terry Tyler, founder of Maple Valley Ski Area in Vermont. The mountain opened under the new ownership in February 1970 hoping that unique offerings such as nighttime snowshoe tours and free board for anyone with a sleeping bag would finally bring in enough business to make the area successful. Weekend Full Day Lift Tickets were only $6.00 1970–1972.

== Closure ==
Competition from other developing resorts such as Sugarloaf and Saddleback, along with the mountain's isolation and strong wind conditions, led to its demise in the mid 1970s. The last known season of operation was 1972–1973 after which the area was advertised for sale in an industry publication of ″Ski Area Management″. With no buyer found by 1974, the area was liquidated, allowed to grow in, and the lodge and lifts were torn down. The mountain is still accessible via a trail that ends at the Coburn Mountain summit. The scar of the resort area remains but has further diminished due to logging projects commenced in the area in the early 2010s. The hiking trail can be reached from the old Enchanted Mountain parking lot located on Enchanted Mountain Road off of U.S. Route 201.
