= Enchanted Pond =

Pond in Somerset County, Maine, US

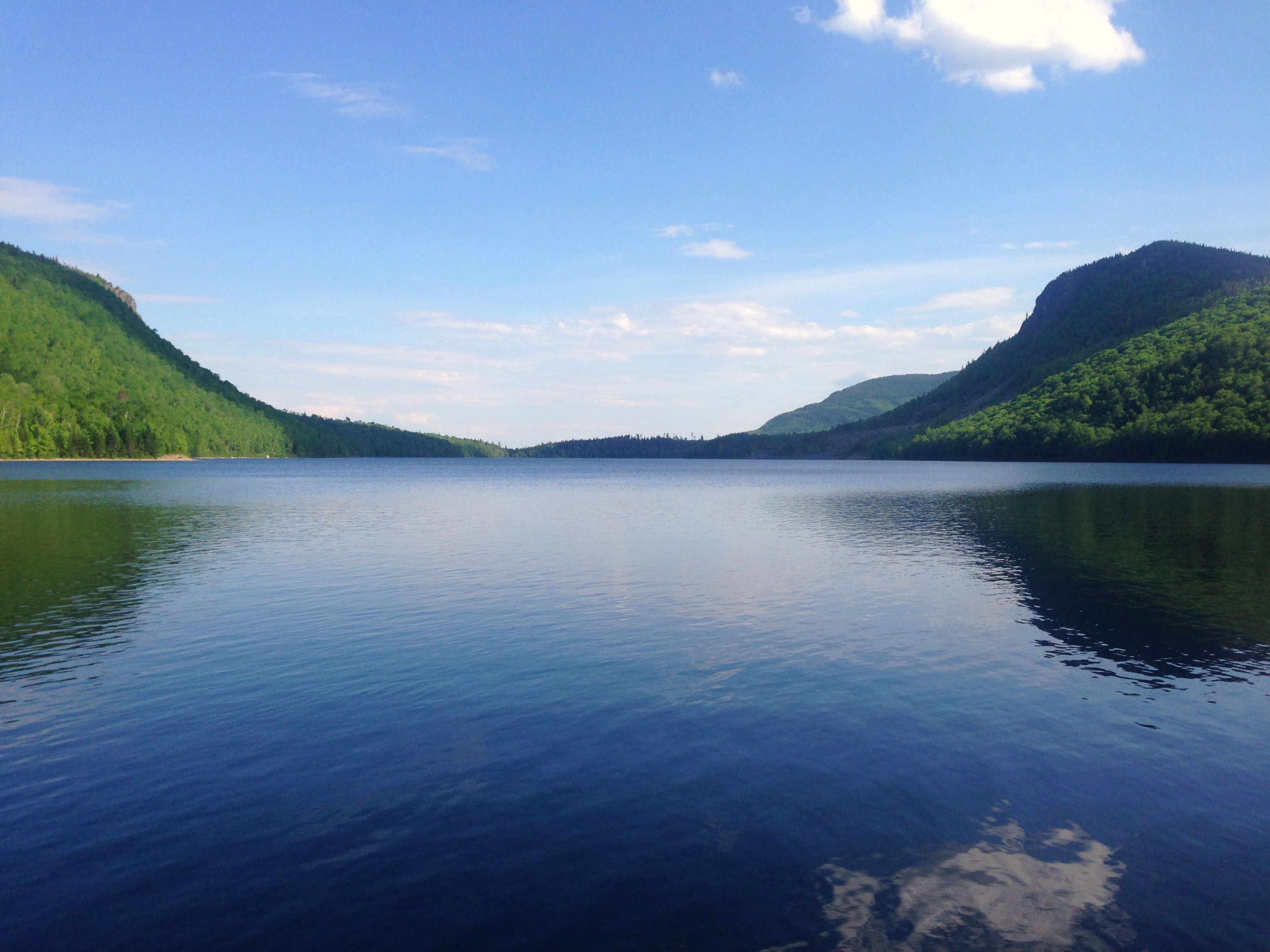
- View of Enchanted Pond from the north

- Location within Maine Location within the United States
- Location: Somerset County, Maine, US
- Coordinates: 45°26′02″N 70°11′06″W
- Type: oligotrophic
- Primary inflows: Little Enchanted
- Primary outflows: Enchanted Stream (Dead River)
- Catchment area: 35 square miles (91 km^{2})
- Basin countries: United States
- Max. length: 2 mi (3.2 km)
- Max. width: 0.5 mi (0.80 km)
- Surface area: 334 acres (135 ha)
- Average depth: 185 ft (56 m)
- Max. depth: 202 ft (62 m)
- Water volume: 25,391 acre⋅ft (31,319,000 m^{3})
- Residence time: 1 month
- Shore length^{1}: 5 mi (8.0 km)
- Surface elevation: 1,443 ft (440 m)
- Islands: None
- Settlements: Bulldog Camps
- ^{1} Shore length is not a well-defined measure.

Enchanted Pond is a mountain pond in the U.S. state of Maine. Situated in the Western Maine Mountains in the Northwest Somerset Region, the pond is located in a deep mountain valley between Coburn Mountain (to the east) and Shutdown Mountain (to the west). Near its southern end, the pond is distinguished by two rockslides from the exposed cliffs of these mountains that extend down into the water along both shores. Enchanted Pond is fed by mountain springs and Little Enchanted Pond, and is the primary source of Enchanted Stream which flows into the Dead River, a tributary of the Kennebec River. Development on the pond is limited to a small set of sporting camps at the northern end of the pond and one remote camp on the southwest shore, both a part of Bulldog Camps. There are no islands in the pond.

Enchanted Pond is exceptionally deep, and has only a very narrow area of shallow water along its shoreline. Rock and gravel make up the majority of its shores with many large boulders in the rockslide areas and a few sandy beaches, one on the east side directly across from another on the west side, and one on the south shore near the outlet. There is very little aquatic vegetation, resulting in excellent water clarity and oligotrophic conditions. The pond was last surveyed by the State of Maine Inland Fisheries and Wildlife in August, 1979 when the water temperature was determined to be 66 °F at the surface and 41 °F at a depth of 100 feet.

== History ==
Shutdown Mountain, with 800-foot (244 m) cliffs rising up abruptly from Enchanted Pond, gave the pond its alternative name "Bulldog Pond" sometime in the mid to late 1800s. Its shale face, along with the rocky cliff that forms the western side of Coburn Mountain resembled the profile of two bulldogs looking across the pond at one other. Since there were other ponds with the name Enchanted, it seemed a good way to uniquely identify this pond in particular.

Enchanted Pond has attracted visitors for well over a century, from early lumbermen who worked out of the logging camps on its north shore to later sportsmen seeking the outdoor tranquility, seclusion, and hunting and fishing opportunities it provided. 19th-century "rusticators" traveled by railroad and after the turn of the century float plane fly-in service became popular for anglers. Guests can spare themselves the arduous ten mile hike in from U.S. Route 201 via the access road built by the owner of Bulldog Camps in 2005. Various species dwell among the surrounding cliffs and talus slopes, including peregrine falcons, bald eagles and common loons. The region also has a large moose and bear population. The shores of the pond are scattered with various fossil rocks millions of years old.

=== Namesake ===
The Enchanted region includes not just Enchanted Pond, but mountain spring-fed Little Enchanted Pond which runs into Upper Enchanted Stream, then into Enchanted Pond, back into Enchanted Stream, into Lower Enchanted Pond and Lower Enchanted Stream, then on to the Dead River. The area was named for the many "enchanting: things that happened there: the upper reaches of Enchanted Stream would go underground from time to time and then pop up again several hundred feet away; men in the woods of the Enchanted would search for the source of laughter or voices they heard, only to find themselves alone in the forest; hunters would follow tracks in the snow out onto frozen Enchanted Pond only to find them disappear in the middle and they could follow them no more.

=== H.P. McKenney log sluice ===
The pond is the historic site of H.P. McKenney’s famous log sluice built in 1898. After several failed attempts at procuring financial assistance to help him with the project, it was apparent that no one believed his modern feat of engineering would work, so Henry Patrick McKenney took it upon himself to finance the job and he and his men spent the next two years constructing a wooden sluiceway down Enchanted Stream to run his logs from Enchanted to the Dead River, saving him a significant amount of mileage to the mill compared to his old route via the Moose River over to Moosehead Lake and down the Kennebec River. Logs were cut on site with four-inch-thick pine planks used for the flooring and three inch planks for the sides. Several trestles were built over deep gullies, ravines, and boulders, from ten feet high up to thirty feet high in places. A wooden dam was constructed at the outlet in order to hold the water back until it was needed for the drive in the spring, although there was no guarantee that the sluice would actually work. In the spring of 1900, after years of backbreaking work, anxiety, and mounting debts, McKenney gave the order to open the gate at the dam, the first load of long logs were guided into the sluice, and down they sped. It was said that it only took the logs one and a quarter minutes to travel the length of the one and a quarter mile sluiceway. In reference to the previously popular opinion that such a sluice could not be successful, some would sarcastically remark at how many huge stacks of logs now waited in the surrounding woods to be sent down H.P.’s Folly.

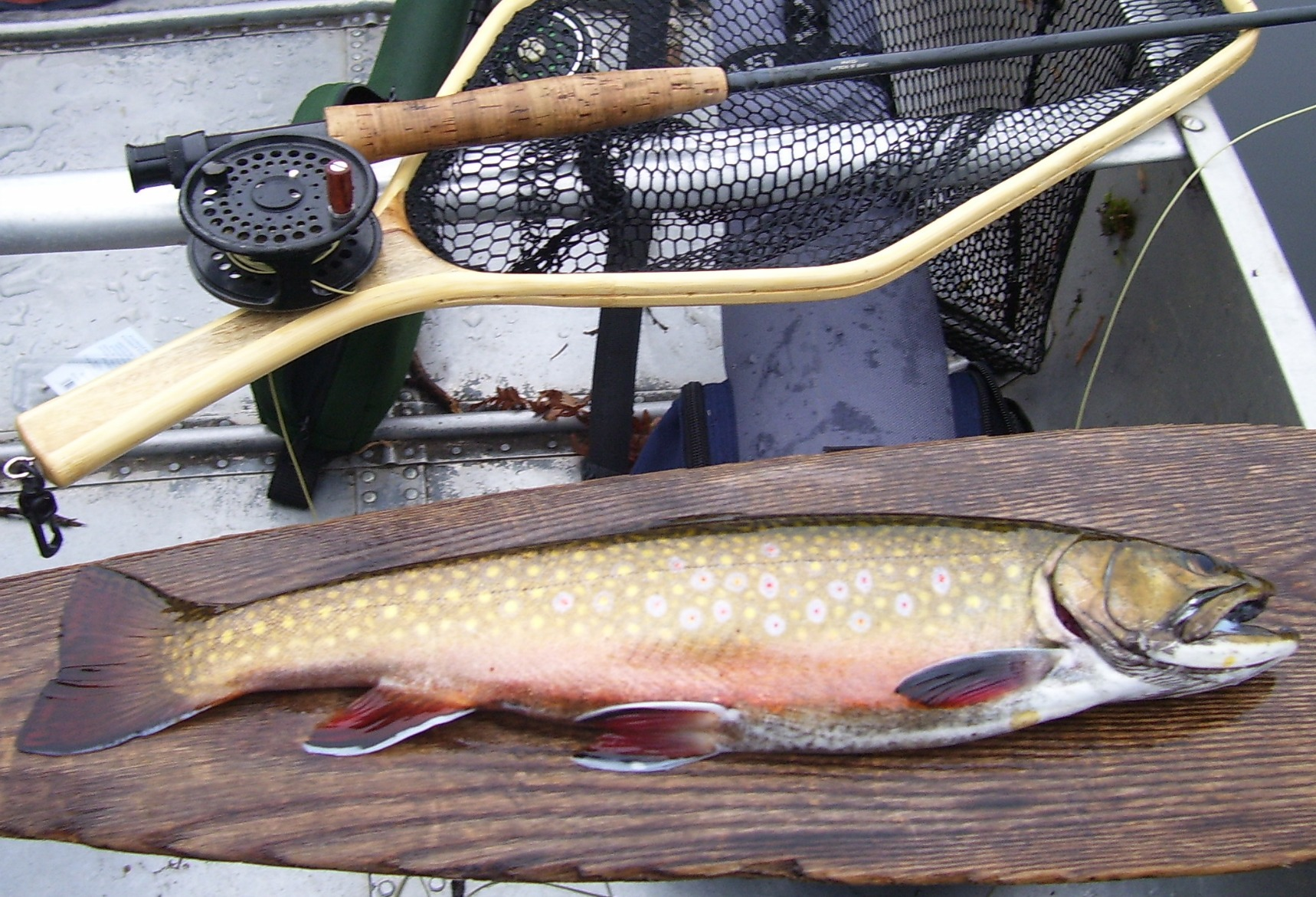
Brook trout caught out of Enchanted Pond, June 2007

== Fish ==
Although water chemistry and conditions are excellent for cold water game fish at all depths, Enchanted Pond is not a very productive pond due to so much of its area being so deep. There are two small tributaries at the northern end of the pond that are good spawning areas for the pond’s population of native brook trout maintained only through natural reproduction. The Enchanted Stream inlet also produces many young trout for the pond as it is an excellent spawning and nursery habitat as well. The Enchanted Stream outlet does not allow for the passage of fish into the pond due to the remains of the old, wooden driving dam, though natural barriers downstream have also prevented other fish species which occur in the drainage from entering Enchanted Pond. There currently exists a regulation prohibiting the use or possession of live bait in order to prevent the introduction of any new species to the pond which is currently being managed for its wild brook trout population.

== Geography ==
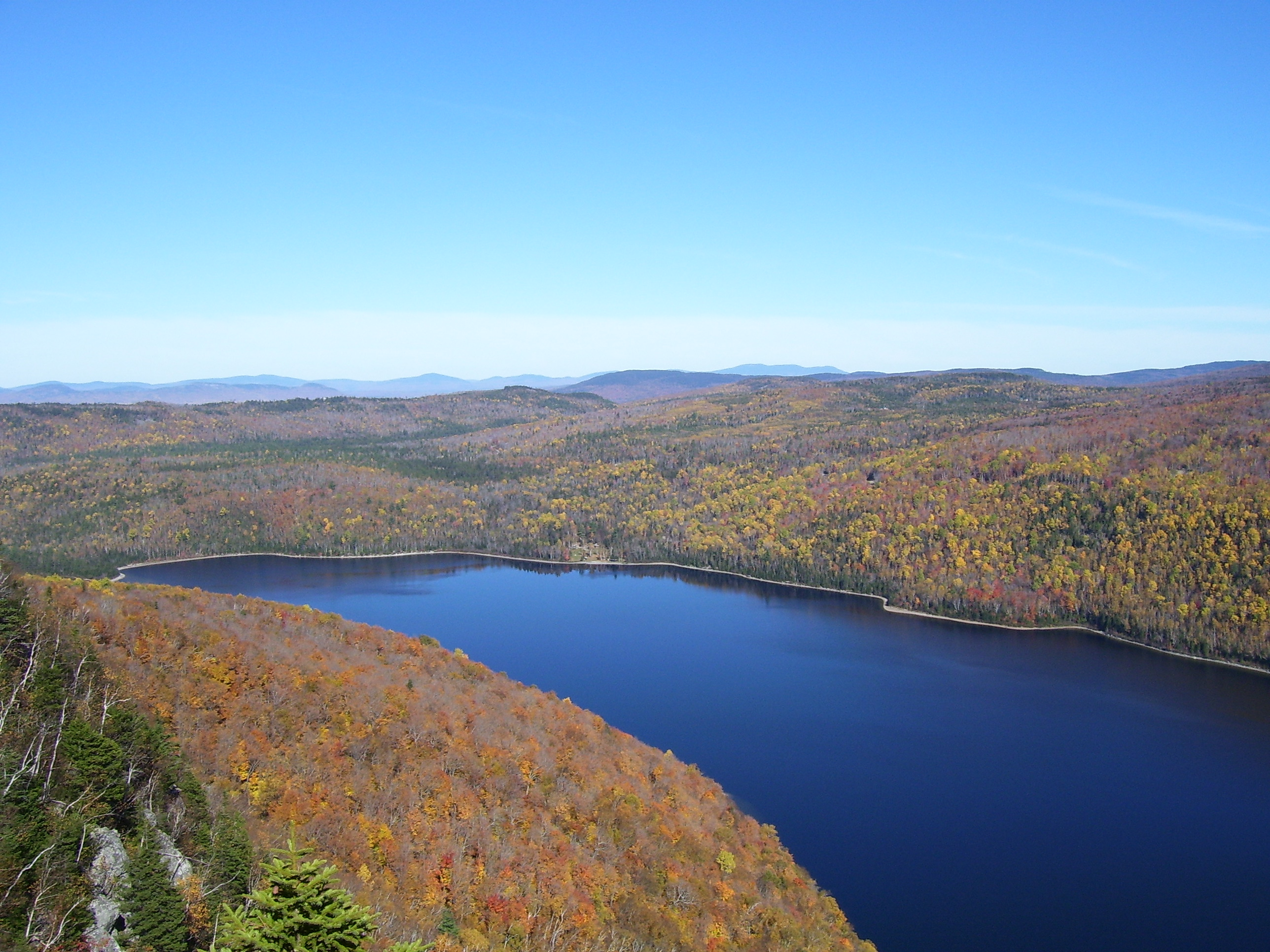
Looking north from Enchanted Lookout in autumn

Set at an elevation of 1,443 feet (440 m), Enchanted Pond is approx. 2 miles long by a half mile wide (3.2 km by 0.8 km), with an area of 1 mile² (2.6 km²), and over 5 miles (8 km) of shoreline. Its major inlet is Enchanted Stream, which flows southeast from Little Enchanted Pond into the northwest corner of Enchanted. To the northeast, a stream fed by springs on Coburn Mountain is its second largest tributary. Flowing out of Enchanted Pond to the south is its only outlet, Lower Enchanted Stream with leads to Lower Enchanted Pond.

Enchanted Pond is located in Upper Enchanted Township in Somerset County, Maine. During the last glacial era, hundreds of natural lakes and ponds were carved into the surrounding landscape, varying in size from one acre (4,000 m²) ponds to Moosehead Lake, at 74,890 acres (303 km²) one of the largest natural freshwater lakes in the United States.

Access to the pond is limited to a few hiking trails and the road built to access Bulldog Camps.

== Development ==
New Hampshire-based Wagner Forest Management oversees the land surrounding the pond as part of its 2.7 million acres of forestland managed as a timberland investment for several select clients. The land is open to the public for low-impact activities such as hunting, fishing and hiking in an attempt to bring residents, money, and tourists to Maine. The land is protected from further development as no other buildings are allowed to be built outside of the existing sporting camps on the north shore. Many areas around the pond have been logged since the 1860s all the way up to clear-cutting that began in the 1970s.

== See also ==
- List of lakes in Maine
