= Tilden Pond =

Pond in Maine

- Location within Maine
- Location: Waldo County, Maine
- Coordinates: 44.3676674°N 69.1124231°W
- Primary outflows: Ducktrap River
- Basin countries: United States
- Surface area: 383 acres (155 ha)
- Max. depth: 11 ft (3.4 m)

Tilden Pond is a pond in Belmont, Waldo County, Maine located at 44.3676674°N 69.1124231°W at an elevation of 230 feet (70 m).

It is a typical coastal warm water pond that covers some 383 acres (155 ha), with a maximum depth reported in 1998 of 11 feet (3.4 m). It is a popular fishing place, especially for smallmouth bass, chain pickerel, and white perch.
