= Bulldog Camps =

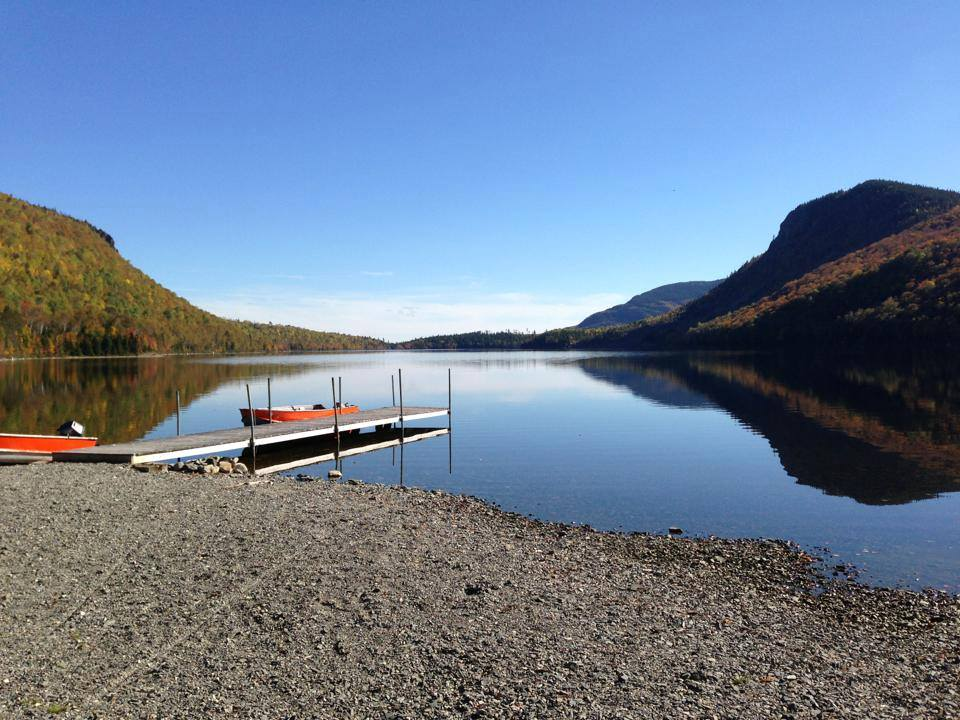
- View of the dock at Bulldog Camps
- Interactive map of Bulldog Camps
- Location: Enchanted Pond, Maine, United States
- Type: sporting camp
- Land: 16 acres
- Campsites: 7 cabins
- Facilities: lodge
- Water: yes
- Fires: yes
- Operated by: Darren Savage
- Website: "www.bulldogcamp.com".

Bulldog Camps
- sporting camp
- Nickname: Enchanted Pond Camps
- Motto: “A Traditional Maine Sporting Camp”
- Location within the state of Maine
- Coordinates: 45°26′33.36″N 70°11′26.30″W
- Country: United States
- State: Maine
- County: Somerset
- Established: 1880s
- Elevation: 1,447 ft (441 m)
- Time zone: UTC-5 (Eastern (EST))
  - Summer (DST): UTC-4 (EDT)
- ZIP code: 04945
- Area code: 207 243-2853
- FIPS code: 23-025
- GNIS Feature ID: 563166
- Website: "www.bulldogcamp.com".

Bulldog Camps (formerly known as Enchanted Pond Camps) on Enchanted Pond is a traditional remote Maine sporting camp in the western mountains that has attracted visitors for over a century. Located in Upper Enchanted Township, near Jackman, Maine, United States, the camps were established by Henry Patrick McKenney in the 1880s as a set of logging camps, were converted into an active sporting camp in the early 1900s, and remain a current member of the Maine Sporting Camp Association.

== Namesake ==
The 800 ft. cliffs of Shutdown and Coburn Mountains that rise up abruptly from either side of Enchanted Pond used to significantly resemble the profile of two bulldogs looking across the pond at one another. The pond was nicknamed "Bulldog Pond" and since the camps on its north shore were the only ones on the lake (as they remain today), they were donned with the seemingly unusual name.

== History ==
The camps were originally established in the 1880s by H.P. McKenney who ran the place as a logging camp for many years and it is the historic site of McKenney’s famous log sluice built to run his logs from Bulldog to the Dead River, saving him a significant amount of mileage to the mill compared to his old route. A wooden dam was constructed at the outlet of Enchanted Pond in order to hold the water back until it was needed for the drive in the spring, although there was much speculation as to whether or not his sluice would actually work. In the spring of 1900, the first load of logs were guided into the sluice with success and the remnants of the old dam and sluice can still be found at the outlet of the pond.

Logging operations came to an end at Bulldog around 1908 and the place was immediately transformed into an active sporting camp. The camps were popular with anglers and sportsmen as the popularity of the region grew with visits from such notable figures as Henry David Thoreau and President Theodore Roosevelt. The Great Depression hit hard and business dropped in the 1930s and 1940s. The camps changed owners several times and in 1957, a couple by the name of Ruel & Hazel Orff bought the place and breathed new life into it, offering the traditional American Plan along with boat rentals, guide service, and float plane fly-in service. Unfortunately the main lodge burned down in the autumn of 1973, shortly after a change in ownership, and for the next few decades the cabins were available to rent on the housekeeping plan only.

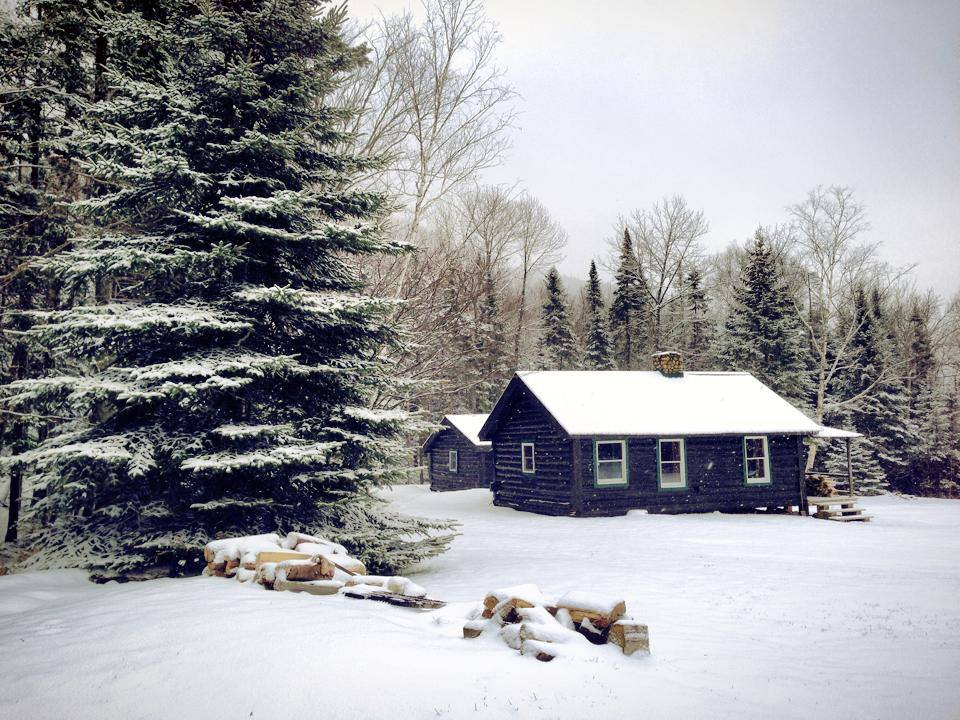
Bulldog Camps transforms into a winter wonderland December–March.

In 2005, current owner Darren Savage bought Bulldog and spent the next several years restoring it to its current state. One of the original 19th century cabins was converted into a new lodge and once again people can enjoy three home cooked meals a day on the traditional American Plan. As the camps had never been open during the winter before, all of the cabins were renovated with new roofs, porches, wood stoves, propane heaters, and full bathrooms with hot running water. A road was built down into the camps that were previously only accessible via 4x4 trail, hiking trail, or float plane. In 2009, the camps gained ownership of a remote camp on the southwest end of Enchanted, the only other building on the pond. This cabin, known as the “Warden’s Camp” was built in 1960 by the chief pilot for the Maine Warden Service and is rented out along with the six cabins at the main camp on the north shore.

The camps bring in the fisherman and ATVers in the spring, annual family vacationers in the summer, and hunters and leaf peepers in the fall.

== Fishing & Hunting ==
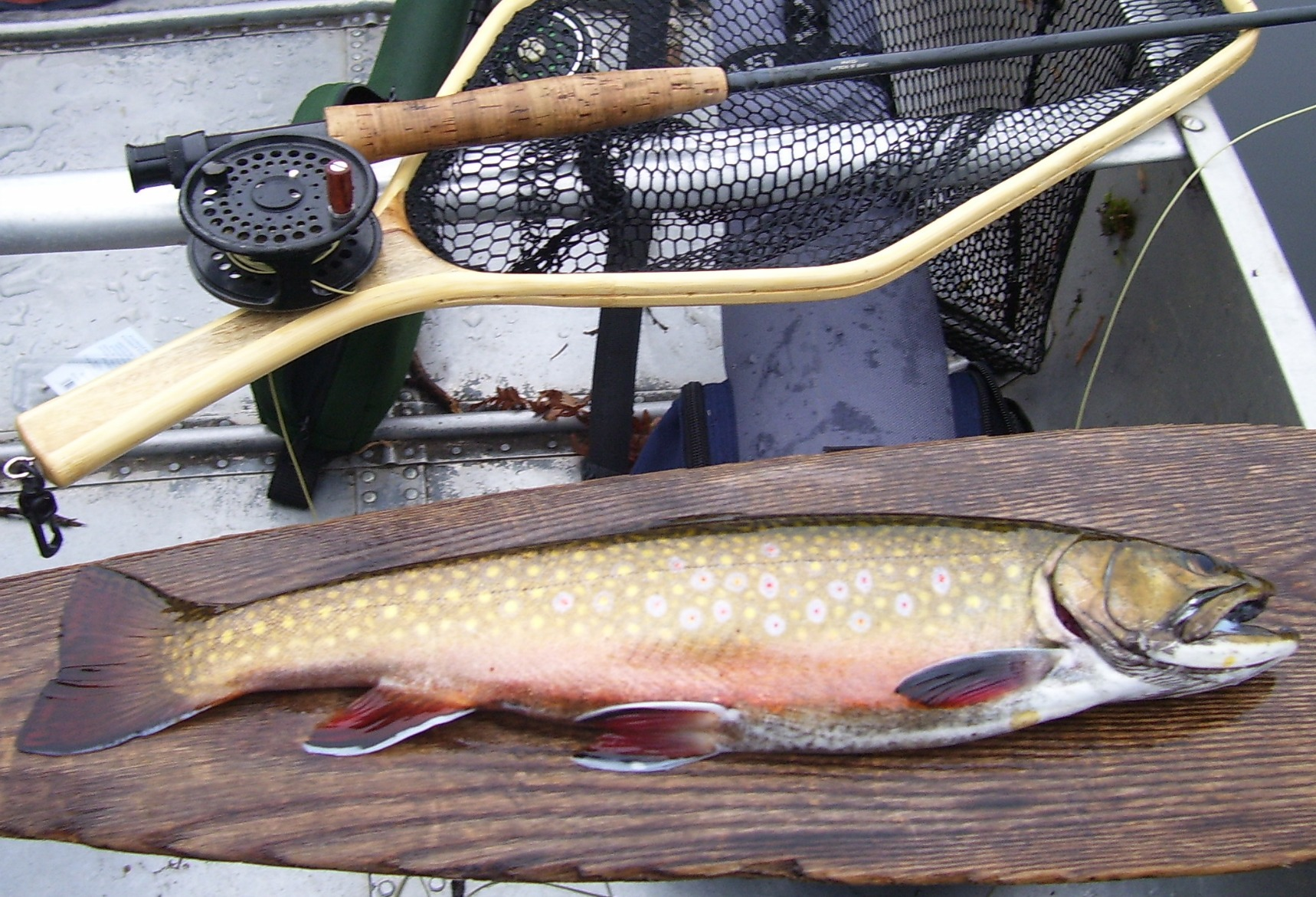
Brook trout caught out of Enchanted Pond, June 2007

Once believed to be bottomless, Enchanted Pond was eventually found to be little over 200 ft. deep, making it the deepest lake in the region. It contains native brook trout in its oligotrophic waters.

Hunts are run in the fall from the last week of August through the first week of December and include hunts for bear, whitetail deer, moose, coyote, grouse, woodcock, and rabbit.
