= Ducktrap River =

River in Maine, United States

Location
- Country: United States

Physical characteristics
- Source
  - location: Maine
  - elevation: 229 feet (70 m)
- Mouth
  - location: West Penobscot Bay
  - coordinates: 44°17′40″N 69°00′00″W
  - elevation: sea level
- Length: 10 mi (16 km)

The Ducktrap River is a river in Waldo County, Maine. From the outflow in Tilden Pond (44°21′41″N 69°06′16″W) in Belmont, the river runs 10.0 miles (16.1 km) southeast, through Camden Hills State Park, to West Penobscot Bay in Lincolnville.

== See also ==
- List of rivers of Maine
