= Maine Guide =

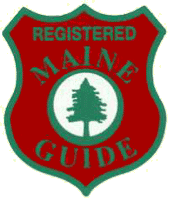
The official patch of a Registered Maine Guide.

Maine Guides are individuals certified to accompany travelers on a number of outdoor activities in the wilderness of the State of Maine, in the United States.

== History ==
On March 19, 1897, The Maine legislature passed a bill requiring hunting guides to register with the state. Maine registered 1316 guides in that first year.

The first Registered Maine Guide was a woman, Cornelia Thurza Crosby, or "Fly Rod Crosby", as she was popularly known. In addition to being its first licensed guide, she promoted Maine's outdoor sports at shows in metropolitan areas, and wrote a popular column that appeared in many newspapers around the country. Her efforts helped to attract thousands of would-be outdoorsmen - and women - to the woods and streams of Maine.

The tradition of women pioneering Maine guiding continued in 1976 when Suzie Hockmeyer, the "Queen of the Kennebec", became the first female whitewater rafting guide.

== What is a Maine Guide? ==
Maine Guides are licensed and registered with the State of Maine. accompanying or assisting any person in the fields, forests, or on the waters or ice within the jurisdiction of the State while white water rafting, hunting, fishing, trapping, boating, snowmobiling or camping at a primitive camping area.

== Becoming a Maine Guide ==
Maine Guides can be licensed in just one or any combination of specialized classifications including white water rafting, hunting, inland fishing, recreational, sea-kayaking, and tide water fishing. Being licensed in a specialized classification means that a person has met the qualifications to guide specific activities:

- Specialized White Water Rafting classification means that a person has met the qualifications to guide commercial rafting passengers down the designated commercial raftable rivers in the State of Maine. White Water Guides are the only classification required to complete a set of training guidelines and have that training certified by a licensed commercial outfitter as specified by the Maine Department of Inland Fisheries & Wildlife. There are 2 levels of license classification: Level I allows the guiding of the Kennebec, Dead, and lower half of the Penobscot River. Level II allows the guiding of all Maine Rivers.
- Specialized Hunting classification means that a person has met the qualifications to guide hunting and trapping, including overnight camping trips in conjunction with hunting and trapping.
- Specialized Fishing classification means that a person has met the qualifications to guide fishing, including overnight camping trips in conjunction with fishing on inland waters.
- Specialized Recreational classification means that a person has met the qualifications to guide boating,kayaking, canoeing, hiking, ATV, snowmobiling, and camping.
- Specialized Sea-Kayaking classification means that a person has met the qualifications to guide sea-kayaking on the State's territorial seas and tributaries of the State up to the head of tide and out to the three mile limit, including overnight camping trips in conjunction with sea-kayaking.
- Specialized Tide-Water Fishing classification means that a person has met the qualifications to guide sport fishing on the State's territorial seas and tributaries of the State up to the head of tide out to the three mile limit, including overnight camping trips in conjunction with tide-water fishing.

To earn a specialized rating Registered Maine Guides must complete a written examination in each license classification. In addition all Maine Guides have passed an oral examination. The oral exam is overseen by a panel of State of Maine Game Wardens and experienced Maine Guides. The oral exam includes map and compass or navigation, lost person or catastrophic event scenarios, general navigation, survival, ethics, first aid, wildlife identification as well as questions to ensure the professional knowledge in the Guide's area of specialization. The process of obtaining a license as a Registered Maine Guide is one of the most difficult in the country due to the need to specifically know and prove woods knowledge, which is why Maine Guides are held in such high regards over other states.

== Master Maine Guide ==
Master certification means that a person has acquired experience in a specialized classification that exceeds the minimum requirements necessary to be licensed as a guide in that classification.

To become a Master Maine Guide, a guide must have been working as a guide for ten years and have had at least five years professional experience in their specialized classification.

== See also ==
- Outfitter
- Guide
