= Sporting camp =

Outdoor recreation establishment

Successful fisherman at Oak Point Camps, Portage Lake, Maine

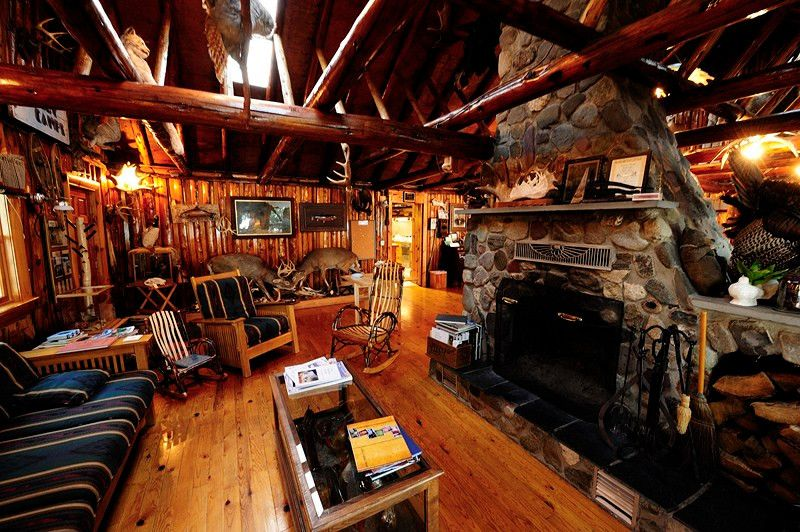
The lodge at Libby Camps, Millinocket, Maine

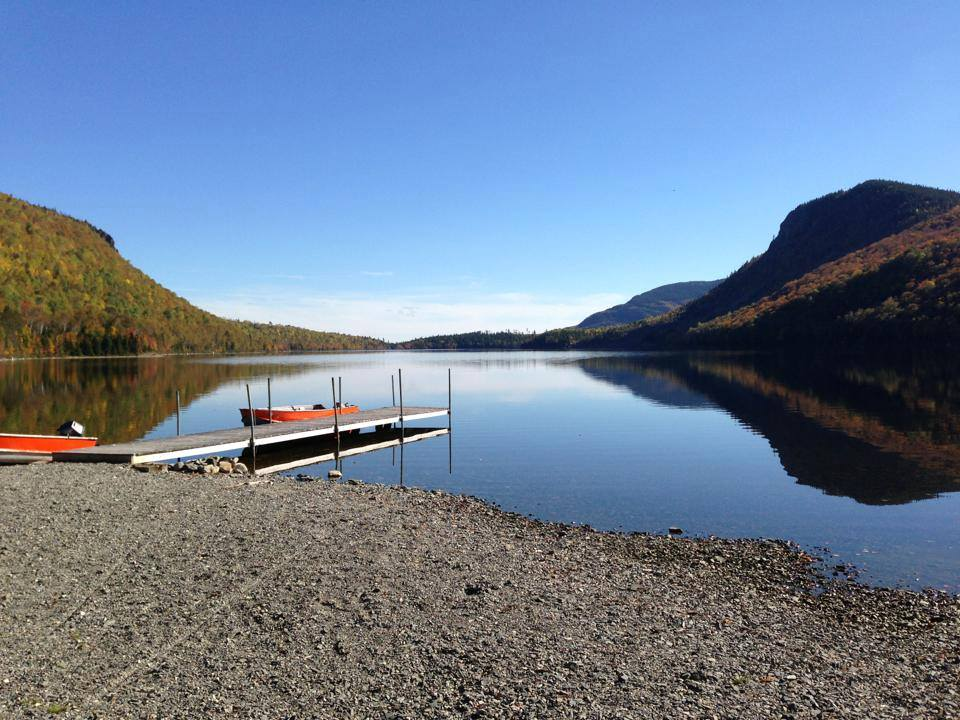
The view from Bulldog Camps, Enchanted Pond, Maine

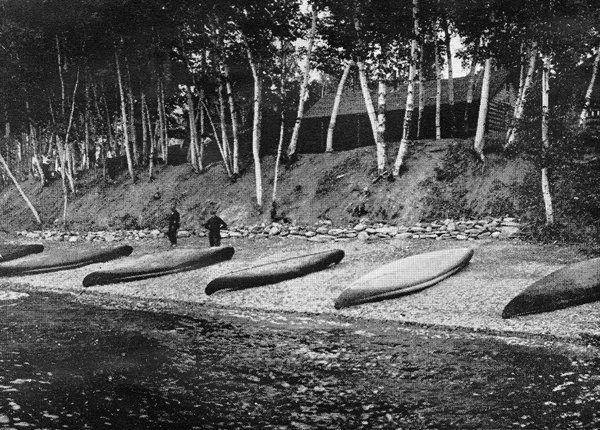
A fleet of canoes at Eagle Lake Sporting Camps.

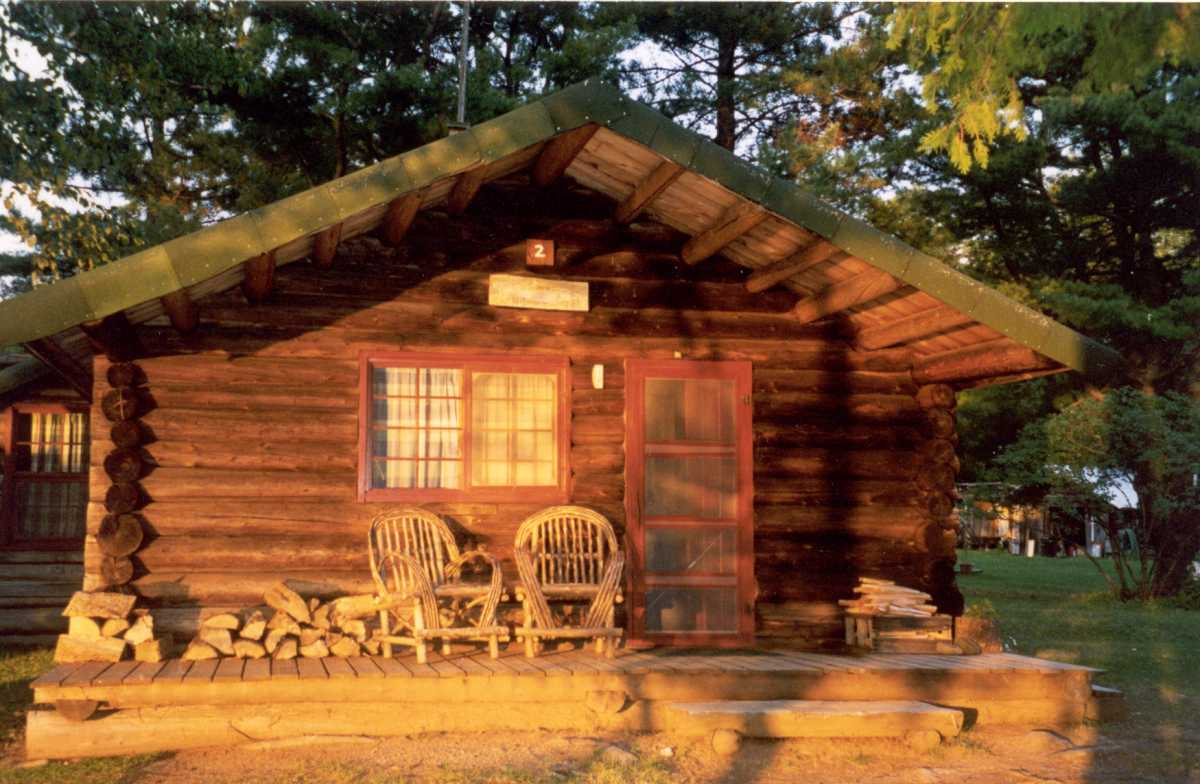
Rustic cabin front at Bradford Camps, Munsungan Lake, Maine

A sporting camp is an establishment that provides lodging, meals and guide service for hunting, fishing, and outdoor recreation and usually consists of a set of “camps” or cabins accompanied by a main lodge (which may or may not have guest rooms). Some also offer primitive outpost cabins. Traditionally found in forests and on lakes in remote locations throughout the state of Maine, sporting camps are a popular lodging destination that have offered a unique outdoors experience to sportsmen across New England and throughout the United States for over a century.

Sporting camps and wilderness lodges allow uniquely easy access to outdoor recreational activities and licensed, Registered Maine Guides along with the opportunity to experience camaraderie with like-minded visitors and a closeness with the surrounding natural environment. Although many sporting camps lack modern amenities such as electricity, indoor plumbing or cell phone coverage, they appeal to those who seek the historic tradition of a Maine wilderness experience.

== History ==
From colonial times through the early years of statehood, Maine's location off the main routes of travel was perceived as a narrow strip of coastal development with primitive living conditions in the interior. In 1846, Henry David Thoreau described every log hut in the woods as a public house. The camps and accompanying hovels for the cattle were barely distinguishable except the camps had a chimney. Beneath the chimney a fire was built on the dirt floor and surrounded by benches of split logs. When recreational hunting became more popular with increased civilian ownership of firearms following the American Civil War, hunting and fishing opportunities of the Maine North Woods encouraged development of interior sporting camps as an alternative to resort facilities along the Maine coast.

Sporting camps were often built beside lakes so the breeze off the open water might blow away some of the black flies, mosquitoes, deer flies and midges which swarm in still air from late spring through early autumn. A 1938 list of camps served by the Bangor and Aroostook Railroad included Bear Mountain and Pleasant Lake Camps, Big Lyford Pond Camps, Camp Chesuncook, Harford's Point Camps, Jerry Pond Camps, Kidney Pond Camps, Lily Bay House, Little Lyford Pond Camps, Pleasant Point Camps, Troutdale Camps, Point of Pine Camps, Rainbow Lake Sporting Camps, Scraggly Lake Sporting Camps, Seboomook House, Shinn Pond House, Spencer Bay Camp, Umcolus Lake Camps, West Branch Pond Camps, West Outlet Camps, Wilson Pond Camps, and Yoke Pond Camps named for water features. Sporting camps served anglers from ice out through the summer and hunters until after the autumn frost; but were often vacant and unheated through the winter months when freezing temperatures might damage indoor plumbing. Flush toilets were uncommon enough to be mentioned in advertisements when available and a 1938 survey of roadside advertising noted very few.

Many of the earliest sporting camps still remain in working operation today. Camps span the Pine Tree State from the Maine North Woods to the western mountains and on to the Down East region. Most are family owned and operated with guests who return every year, often from one generation to the next. Guests originally traveled by some combination of steamboat, railroad, horse-drawn carriage or wagon, canoe, or even by foot, although now many camps gain access by floatplane or unpaved logging roads.

Some Maine sporting camps offer a traditional “American Plan” which, along with the lodging, includes three meals a day served in the camp's main lodge. Most camps also offer a “Housekeeping Plan” for guests who wish to do their own cooking. Many camps have canoes or motor boats available for rent along with guide service provided by wilderness guides licensed by the state of Maine for fishing, hunting, recreation, or some combination of the three.

Most sporting camps are historic in their own way. Some were built specifically for sporting purposes around the turn of the century while others began as private residences or retreats and were renovated later to accommodate business needs. Many were work or logging camps in the 1800s before they were converted into sporting camps, and guests often learn camp history by talking to the owners. The popularity of sporting camps in Maine prompted outfitters and businesses such as L.L.Bean to provide hunters and anglers with gear that could withstand harsh Maine wilderness conditions.

Many camps lease the land surrounding their camps for exclusive hunting rights to offer improved hunting opportunities to guests. Sporting camp owners are typically environmentally conscious and dedicated to preserving the wild lands they call home.

== Types ==
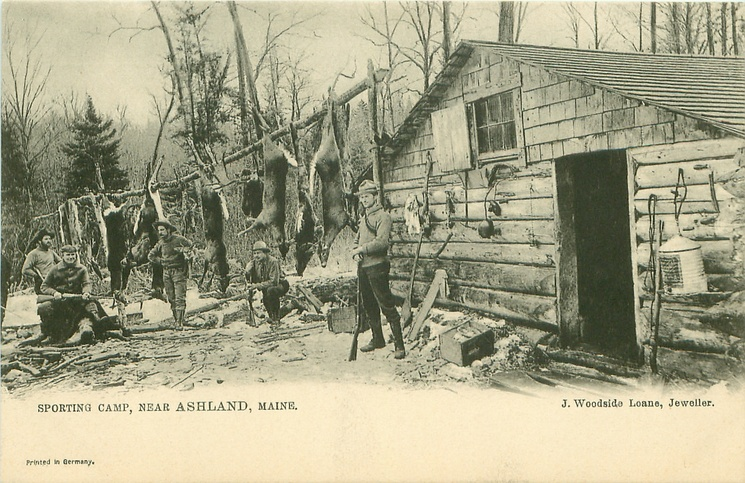
A 1906 postcard of a sporting camp near Ashland, Maine shows a group of successful sportsmen.

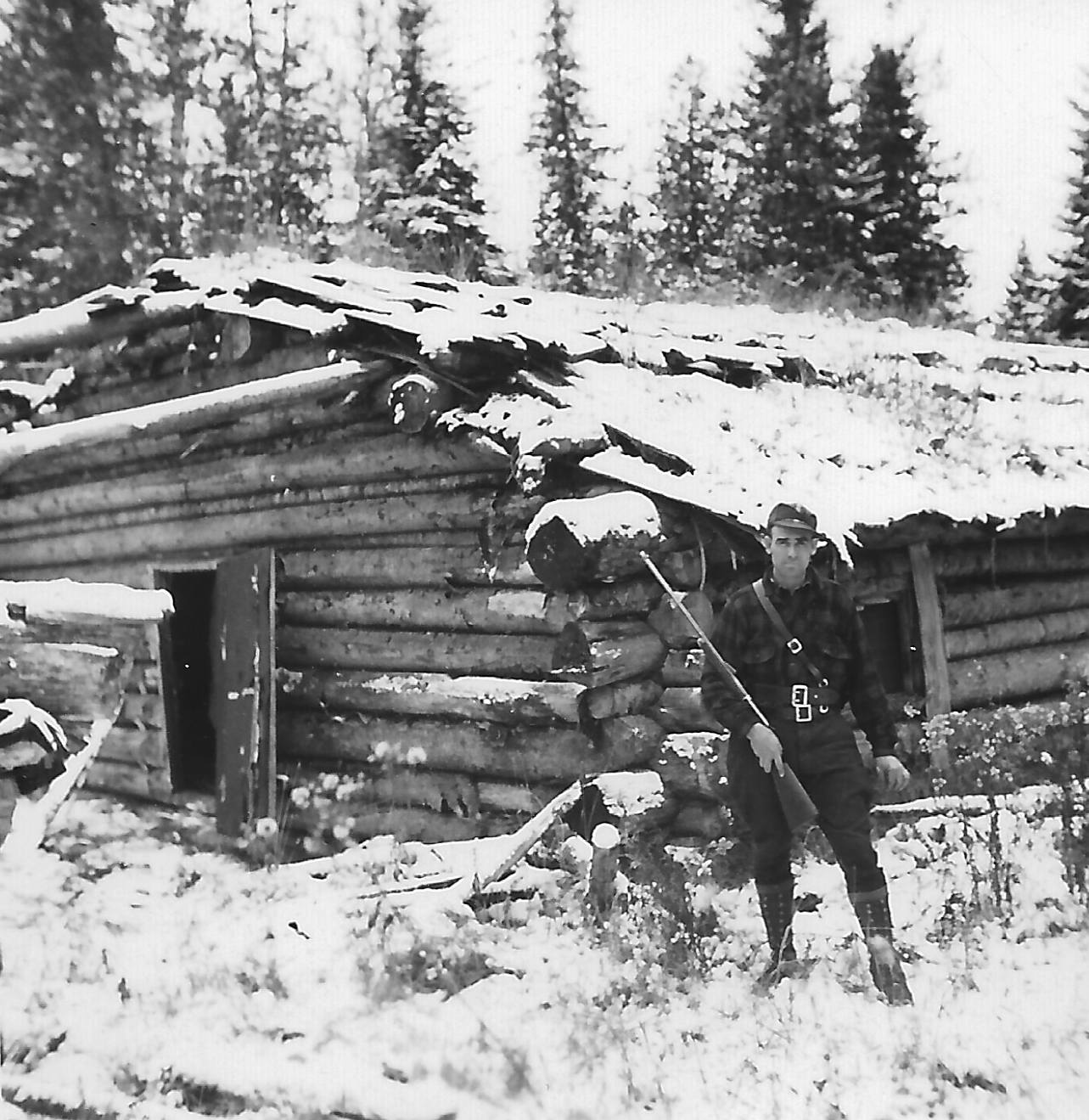
A rustic Aroostook County hunting camp in 1941

=== Remote ===
Traditionally sporting camps were always “remote”, which made them desirable destinations for fishing, hunting, and other types of outdoor recreation. Remote camps are typically rustic wilderness log cabins without such modern utilities as indoor plumbing, electricity or telephone lines; but many have been updated or adjusted to make for a more comfortable stay. Many remote camps use propane gas mantle lanterns for light, wood-burning stoves for heat and cooking, and gravity fed water for flush toilets and showers or bathhouses. Propane refrigerators and stoves replace the need for electric ones, and a generator may be found on site for various camp chores requiring electricity.

=== Non-Remote ===
Usually found along paved roads or in areas just outside town, non-remote sporting camps and lodges are more likely to have been updated with the amenities one might find in an average hotel or motel today. They usually have easy access year round, on-site parking, full electricity and running water but can also be outfitted with modern comforts such as a microwave, TV, Wi-Fi internet access or radiant floor heating.

=== Unique and Specialty Camps ===
If a sporting camp provides something above and beyond the average traditional experience, they are usually considered a unique or specialty camp. These camps might include fly-in service by floatplane or access to outpost cabins that enhance a guest's visit by exposing them to more than just their main camp which is usually more easily accessible.

== Management ==
Due to the nature of the business and its limited access, many sporting camps are family owned and operated often through several generations. Some camp owners hire a business operator to live on-site and manage camp operations and other employees. Sporting camps as a whole are mandated by the state to hold certain licenses and adhere to certain operational codes similar to hotels or restaurants. The Maine Sporting Camp Association was founded in 1987 to preserve the sporting camp's uniqueness in the State of Maine and provide sporting camp owners with a voice in any state legislation or environmental issues that may arise with the potential to affect the role of these camps or the services they offer. While membership to the MSCA is optional, the organization helps define standards by which sporting camps should operate and the foundation on which they have been built.

== Life in a Sporting Camp ==
Daily life in camp can be rough, but offers unique comforts. Over a century ago, fishermen and hunters would spend weeks in camp as it took them so long to travel there from wherever they came from. Chores had to be done during daylight hours to prepare and serve food and clean up after sportsmen with appetites whetted by outdoor exercise. It was not unusual to find a woman or two in a sporting camp, and it was even said they often weathered the harsh conditions of camp life with a little more grace than their male counterparts. Cabins were initially quite drafty and simple and the wind would whistle through the logs perhaps echoing the call of the loons on the lake. All provisions, including water, had to be carried into cabins equipped with wood stoves for heat and using candles or kerosene or gas lanterns for light.

== Activities & The Seasons ==
Guests using a sporting camp as a home base find Maine's unique natural settings right at their doorstep. Each season offers a unique way to explore the pristine Maine wilderness.

=== Summer ===
Sporting camps have always been popular during the summer vacation season, especially with families. Activities available during the summer months might include ATVing, fishing, fly fishing, hiking, canoeing, kayaking, paddling, boating, mountain biking, mountainboarding, swimming, photography, wildlife viewing, bird watching, berry picking, rock climbing, mountaineering, old-fashioned lawn games or s’mores at the campfire under a sky full of stars.

=== Autumn ===
Fall visitors to a sporting camp may witness the ever-changing painting of the region's foliage or take advantage of the fall hunting seasons on big or small game. Autumn camp activities might include hiking, canoeing, kayaking, paddling, mountain biking, hunting for birds, bear, moose, deer, coyote, rabbit or other small game, leaf-peeping, photography, wildlife viewing, bird watching, and rock climbing.

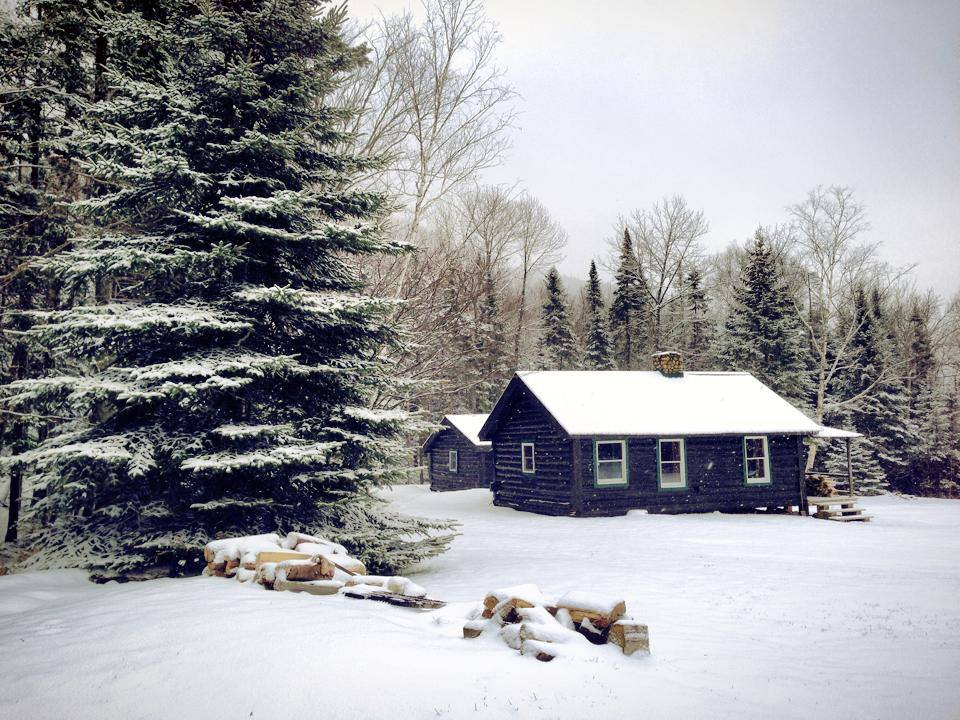
Bulldog Camps transforms into a winter wonderland December–March.

=== Winter ===
Winter activities at a sporting camp might include ice fishing, cross-country skiing, snowmobiling, photography, wildlife viewing, bird watching, dog sledding, and snowshoeing. The pristine whiteness which often blankets the landscape from December through March may limit access to remote camps, and very few remain open during this season due to impassable roads. State work crews plow the state and federal highways, town employees clear town roads on a schedule reflecting priorities of permanent residents, and access over private roads is landowner or road association responsibility. Maine winter storms and low temperatures sometimes challenge even the most modern snow removal equipment. Through the early years of the twentieth century, carriages and automobiles were tucked away in barns for the winter months while teams of horses or oxen pulled giant rollers over the roads to pack the snow into an icy surface suitable for horse-drawn sleighs.

=== Spring ===
If a camp is on a lake or pond, it usually opens back up in the spring when the ice goes out. This is the best season for fishing in Maine and often anglers would hire a Maine Guide to take them into the remote Maine wilderness to fish remote ponds or rivers they couldn't necessarily navigate on their own. Experienced anglers find fishing best when the biting flies which breed in cold, clean water are most numerous. Activities in the spring at a sporting camp might include fishing, fly fishing, All-Terrain Vehicle riding, bear hunting, hiking, canoeing, kayaking, paddling, boating, mountain biking, swimming, photography, wildlife viewing, bird watching, and mountaineering.

== Current Association Members ==
The following sporting camps are members in good standing with the Maine Sporting Camp Association: Alden Camps, Beaver Cove Camps, Bosebuck Mountain Camps, Bradford Camps, Bulldog Camps, Castle Island Camps, Chandler Lake Camps, Chesuncook Lake House and Cabins, Claybrook Mountain Lodge, Cobbs Pierce Pond Camps, Cowgers' Lakefront Cabins, Down River Camps, Eagle Lake Sporting Camps, Eagle Lodge, Fox Carlton Pond Sporting Camps, Grand Lake Lodge, Greenland Cove Cabins, Homestead Lodge, The Last Resort, Libby Camps, Long Lake Camps, Macannamac Camps and Lodges, Nahmakanta Lake Camps, Nicatous Lodge and Camps, The Pines Lodge, Red River Camps, Rideout's Lakeside Lodge & Cabins, South Branch Lake Camps, Spencer Pond Camps, Tim Pond Camps, Umcolcus Sporting Camps, Weatherby's Resort, West Branch Pond Camps, Whisperwood Lodge and Cottages, Willard Jalbert Camps, Inc., and Wilson Pond Camps.

== See also ==
- Log Cabin
- Maine Guide

== Sources ==
- Arlen, Alice (2003). Maine Sporting Camps: The Year-Round Guide to Vacationing at Traditional Hunting & Fishing Lodges (3rd ed.). Woodstock, VT: Countryman Press. ISBN 0881505609.
- Roberts, Kenneth (1938). Trending into Maine (Fourth ed.). Boston: Little, Brown and Company.
- Starkey, Glenn Wendell (1947). Maine (Fourth ed.). New York: Silver Burdett Company.
- Thoreau, Henry David (1966). The Maine Woods (Apollo ed.). Thomas Y. Crowell Company.
- Wilson, Donald A. (2005). Maine Lodges and Sporting Camps. Portsmouth, NH: Arcadia Publishing. ISBN 0738537705.
