= Goose Rocks Light =

Lighthouse in Maine, US

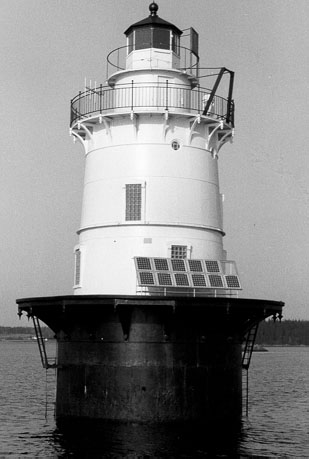
- US Coast Guard photo
- Location: North Haven, Maine
- Coordinates: 44°8′7.5″N 68°49′50.4″W

Tower
- Constructed: 1890
- Foundation: cast iron and concrete caisson
- Construction: cast iron
- Automated: 1963
- Height: 15.5 m (51 ft)
- Shape: sparkplug
- Markings: white with black base and trim
- Heritage: National Register of Historic Places listed place
- Fog signal: HORN: 1 every 10s

Light
- Focal height: 51 feet (16 m)
- Lens: 4th order Fresnel (original), 9.8 inches (250 mm) (current)
- Range: 12 nautical miles (22 km; 14 mi) & 11 nautical miles (20 km; 13 mi)
- Characteristic: Fl W 6s with R sector
- Goose Rocks Light Station
- U.S. National Register of Historic Places
- Nearest city: North Haven, Maine
- Built: 1890
- Architect: US Army Corps of Engineers
- MPS: Light Stations of Maine MPS
- NRHP reference No.: 87002267
- Added to NRHP: January 21, 1988

Goose Rocks Light is a sparkplug lighthouse located near North Haven, Maine in Penobscot Bay. It stands at the eastern entrance to the Fox Islands Thoroughfare, a busy mile-wide passage separating North Haven from Vinalhaven. Built in 1890, it was added to the National Register of Historic Places as Goose Rocks Light Station on January 21, 1988. The structure is now privately owned by a preservation group, and remains an active aid to navigation.

== Description and history ==
The Maine town of North Haven occupies a large eponymous island in the south center of Penobscot Bay. The island is studded with inlets and peninsulas, and is just north of Vinalhaven, the other major island of the Fox Islands group, from which it is separated by the Fox Island Thoroughfare. Goose Rocks is a ledge roughly between Stimpson Island (part of North Haven) and Widows Island (part of Vinalhaven) at the eastern end of the Thoroughfare. It is a sparkplug lighthouse, a four-level tapered structure with walls of cast iron plating set on a concrete base. The second level of the structure serves as the keeper's quarters, with the lantern house as the fourth stage. The tower is painted white, with a black base and trim.

The light station was established in 1890, at a time when Vinalhaven was the site of major granite quarries, and both communities were attracting a significant number of summer visitors. The light was automated in 1963. Declared surplus in the 1990s, a proposal was first floated to turn the building over to the town of North Haven, but this was never realized. In 2006 it was sold to the non-profit Beacon Preservation organization. The light itself is maintained by the Coast Guard, and remains an active aid to navigation.

== See also ==
- Browns Head Light, at the western end of the Fox Islands Thoroughfare
- National Register of Historic Places listings in Knox County, Maine
