= Browns Head Light =

Lighthouse in Maine, US

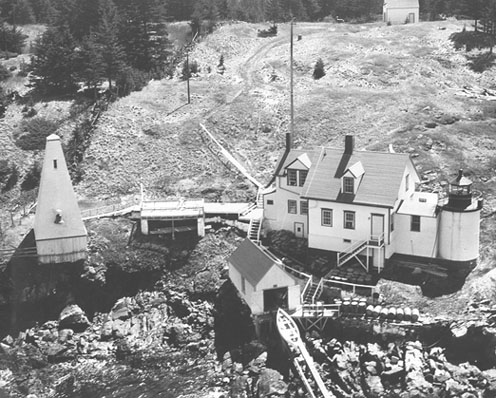
- Location: Browns Head, Vinalhaven, Maine
- Coordinates: 44°6′42.352″N 68°54′34.186″W

Tower
- Constructed: 1832
- Automated: 1987
- Height: 6 m (20 ft)
- Shape: Cylindrical
- Markings: White
- Heritage: National Register of Historic Places listed place
- Fog signal: HORN: 1 every 10s

Light
- First lit: 1857 (current structure)
- Focal height: 39 feet (12 m)
- Range: 14 nautical miles (26 km; 16 mi) & 11 nautical miles (20 km; 13 mi)
- Characteristic: F W with 2 R sectors
- Browns Head Light Station
- U.S. National Register of Historic Places
- Built: 1857
- NRHP reference No.: 83000460
- Added to NRHP: January 27, 1983

Browns Head Light is a lighthouse in Vinalhaven, Maine. Established in 1832, it is an active aid to navigation, marking the southern side of the western entrance to the Fox Island Thoroughfare, a busy strait separating Vinalhaven Island from North Haven. The present lighthouse was built in 1857; and was listed on the National Register of Historic Places as "Browns Head Light Station" on January 27, 1983.

== Description and history ==
The Maine town of Vinalhaven occupies a large eponymous island in the south center of Penobscot Bay. The island is studded with inlets and peninsulas, and is just south of North Haven, the other major island of the Fox Islands group, from which it is separated by the Fox Island Thoroughfare. Browns Head is a promontory near the western entrance to the Thoroughfare, and the lighthouse is located on its western shore. The lighthouse is a cylindrical granite structure with a six-sided lantern house, 18 feet (5.5 m) in height, standing with its light about 37 feet (11 m) above sea level. The light has a range of 15 miles (24 km). It is connected by a short covered passageway to the keeper's house, a 1 1/2-story wood-frame structure.

A light station first went into operation at this location in 1832. The present tower dates to 1857, and was originally equipped with a fifth-order Fresnel lens. The light was automated in 1987, and remains an active aid to navigation. The light is a well-preserved example of a pre-Civil War lighthouse complex.

== In popular culture ==
- Folk singer John McCutcheon has a song entitled Old Brown's Head Light.
- The lighthouse features prominently in the 1988 Italian thriller Qualcuno in ascolto starring Vincent Spano.

== See also ==
- Goose Rocks Light, marking the eastern end of the Fox Island Thoroughfare
- National Register of Historic Places listings in Knox County, Maine
