= Penobscot Island Air =

Airline of the United States

IATA	ICAO	Call sign
-	-	-
- Founded: December 10, 2004; 21 years ago Rockland, Maine, U.S.
- Operating bases: Knox County Regional Airport
- Fleet size: 6
- Destinations: 5
- Key people: Kevin Waters, Sean Creeley
- Website: penobscotislandair.net

Penobscot Island Air is a Part 135 air taxi airline based at Knox County Regional Airport, Maine, United States (RKD) operating from a private hangar. The airline operates scheduled service to the islands in Maine's Penobscot Bay and offers private charter land and seaplane flights throughout the region. The airline does not use a designated callsign for ATC communication; instead, it identifies itself using the aircraft's registration number, such as 'November Two Zero Seven Juliet Papa.'

== History ==
Kevin Waters founded Penobscot Island Air in 2004 after the previous company, Maine Atlantic Aviation ceased operations.

In November 2023, Sean and Andi Creeley acquired Penobscot Island Air and sister carrier Katahdin Air from the Waters family.

== Fleet ==
Penobscot Island Air operates a fleet of Cessna aircraft equipped with both wheels and floats. The Penobscot Island Air fleet includes the following aircraft types (as of 21 May 2014).

- Cessna 206
- Cessna 207

As of October 2025, current fleet registrations include: N707KW, N4615X, N734HX, and N756SG (Cessna 206), and N900DF and N207JP (Cessna 207).

== Destinations ==
Penobscot Island Air operates scheduled cargo and passenger flights to the following destinations within the state of Maine (as of 20 March 2016).

- Islesboro
- Rockland
- Matinicus Isle
- North Haven
- Vinalhaven

Charter flights are routinely flown to a number of airports including:

- Bangor
- Bar Harbor
- Belfast
- Biddeford
- Big Green
- Brunswick Executive
- Criehaven
- Portland
- Stonington
- Wiscasset

== Accidents ==
- On October 5, 2011, a Cessna 207A crashed while attempting to land at Matinicus. The pilot and sole occupant of the cargo flight were killed.
- On July 17, 2011, a Cessna 206G made a water landing shortly after takeoff from Matinicus. The four occupants of the aircraft were rescued from the ocean.
- On June 26, 2017, a Cessna 206 crashed shortly after takeoff from Vinalhaven. The pilot and sole occupant were taken to the Knox County Hospital with non-life-threatening injuries.
- On September 1, 2017, a Cessna U206G (registration N4615X), crashed in a field near Harpswell, Maine while on a repositioning flight from Rockland to Portland, Maine. The sole pilot was not injured, however the Cessna was substantially damaged. It has now since been repaired and re-entered service for PIA.
