= Owen P. Lyons =

American politician

Owen P. Lyons (November 11, 1849 – 1933) was an American politician from Vinalhaven, Maine.

== Life ==
He was the son of John (1823–1862) and Bridget (1826–1901) Lyons. He was born in Halifax, Nova Scotia, immigrated to Vinalhaven in 1867, and became an American citizen in 1874.

He was a professional stonecutter and jeweler. He was the director of the Vinalhaven's first band, the Vinalhaven Cornet Band, in 1870, and continued in that role for over thirty years. He founded Vinalhaven's first newspaper, The Wind, in 1884.

He lost the 1886 state representative election to his brother, Thomas J. Lyons, by one vote. He was the only Democrat elected to the Maine Senate in 1892. He resigned from that office in 1893, having received a recess appointment as postmaster of Vinalhaven by President Grover Cleveland on March 30, 1893. He was confirmed by the Senate on December 13, 1894, and served in that position until September 18, 1897.

Lyons served as a selectman for Vinalhaven from 1884 until 1886 and again from 1899 until 1902. He served as town clerk of Vinalhaven from 1889 until 1927. As of 1896, he was the Chief Engineer of the Vinalhaven Fire Department. He continued serving in the fire department through 1907. He served as one of Knox County's three commissioners from 1905 until 1910.

He was buried in St. James Cemetery in Thomaston, Maine.
