= Pleasant River Grange No. 492 =

- U.S. National Register of Historic Places
- Location within Maine Location within the United States
- Location: N side of Round the Island Rd., 0.15 miles east of its junction with N. Haven Rd., Vinalhaven, Maine
- Coordinates: 44°4′33″N 68°50′20″W
- Area: less than one acre
- Built: 1909
- NRHP reference No.: 99001190
- Added to NRHP: October 08, 1999

The Pleasant River Grange No. 492 is a historic Grange hall on Round the Island Road in Vinalhaven, Maine. Built as worker housing for a granite quarry, it was moved in 1909 to its present local for use by the local Grange chapter. It continues to be used by that organization as a community resource. It was listed on the National Register of Historic Places in 1999.

== Description and history ==
The Pleasant River Grange is located in a rural area near the center of Vinalhaven island. The island is nearly divided by the Pleasant River, a north-flowing stream the exits into Vinal Cove; the grange hall is located on the east side of the river near its mouth, on the north side of Round the Island Road, east of its junction with North Haven Road. It is a two-story wood-frame structure, with a gabled roof, clapboard siding, and a granite foundation. The facade facing southeast toward the road is symmetrical, with two sash windows on each floor, and one in the gable. The main entrance is on the longer southwest facade, near the southern corner and under a shed-roof porch. The interior has a hallway extending across the front, with a dining room and kitchen in the rear of the first floor, and open auditorium on the second floor. The walls and ceilings are finished in tongue-and-groove maple.

The grange hall was originally a workers boarding house built by A.M. Webster for workers at his nearby granite quarry, and was located on the west side of the Pleasant River. The local Grange chapter was organized in 1908, and Webster (who had recently closed the quarry) donated the building to the new organization. During the winter of 1908–09, it was hauled across the frozen Pleasant River to its present location. Alterations to the interior for its new function lasted another three years, with the hall periodically used for dances and other fundraising activities. The Grange continues to be a significant community organization on the island.

== See also ==
- National Register of Historic Places listings in Knox County, Maine
