= Eric Hopkins =

American painter

Eric Hopkins (born 1951) is an American painter known for his aerial paintings of Penobscot Bay, Maine and glasswork.

== Life and career ==
Hopkins was born in Bangor, Maine in 1951. He is a descendant of Dr. Theophilus Hopkins, a Revolutionary War soldier in the Massachusetts regiment of George Washington's army. Hopkins grew up in North Haven, Maine where he sold pop art figures he created out of lobster shells starting at age 9. When Hopkins was 16 years old, he and his brother David opened an art gallery on the family's Hopkins Wharf. A graduate of Rockland District High School in 1969, Hopkins studied at Gorham State Teachers College (now the University of Southern Maine), Haystack Mountain School of Crafts, Montserrat College of Art, before graduating in 1976 from the Rhode Island School of Design where he studied with glass sculptor Dale Chihuly.

In 1981, Hopkins moved back to North Haven where he opened a gallery and married. In 1983 he learned to fly an airplane; from the air he filmed the ocean, coastline and mountains of mid-coast Maine with a VCR camcorder and later developed the recording into paintings. He received his recreational pilot's license in 2004.

Hopkins moved to Rockland in 2006 and opened a second art gallery. Hopkins' mother owned and operated the Hopkins Wharf Gallery and North Haven Gift Shop (formerly W.S. Hopkins General Store) on North Haven for 60 years. Hopkins' brother and a partner run the gallery. Hopkins supplied the artwork and projection photography in 2021 for the musical Islands by John Wulp and Cidny Bullens.

In the book Eric Hopkins: Above and Beyond, Carl Little associates Hopkins' style with early 20th century modern painters such as John Marin to "reduce phenomena to their most essential components." Hopkins is the subject of the Maine Public film series documentary Eric Hopkins: Atmospheres by filmmaker Dale Schierholt. The Bangor Republican newspaper called him "The Official State Artist of Maine".

Hopkins' work is included in the public collection of the Corning Museum of Glass. Wustum Museum of Fine Arts and the Farnsworth Museum. His work has been displayed by the U.S. Department of State's Art in Embassies program.
