= One Through Zero (The Ten Numbers) =

Series of sculptures

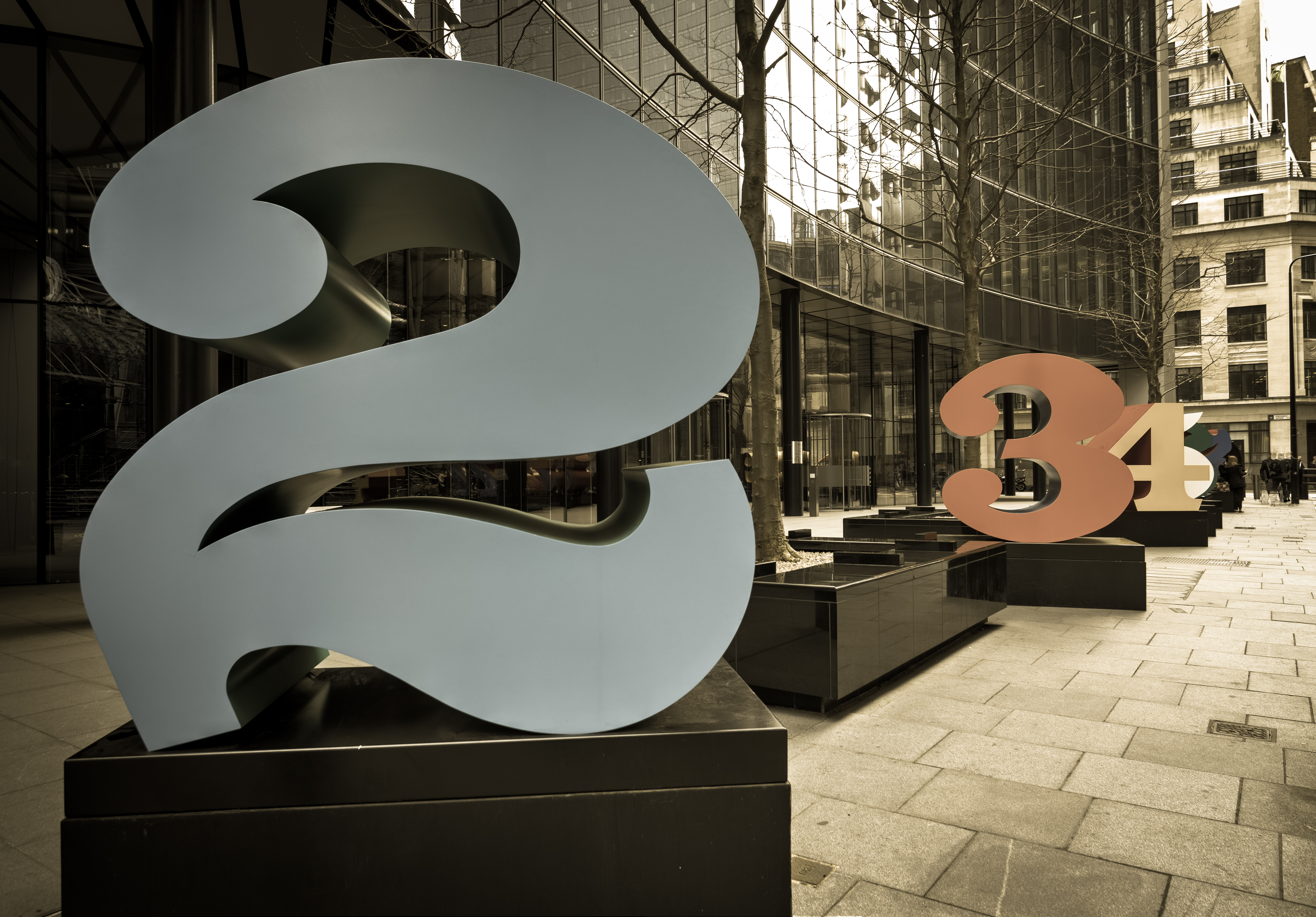
One Through Zero (The Ten Numbers) on Lime Street, in the City of London in 2014

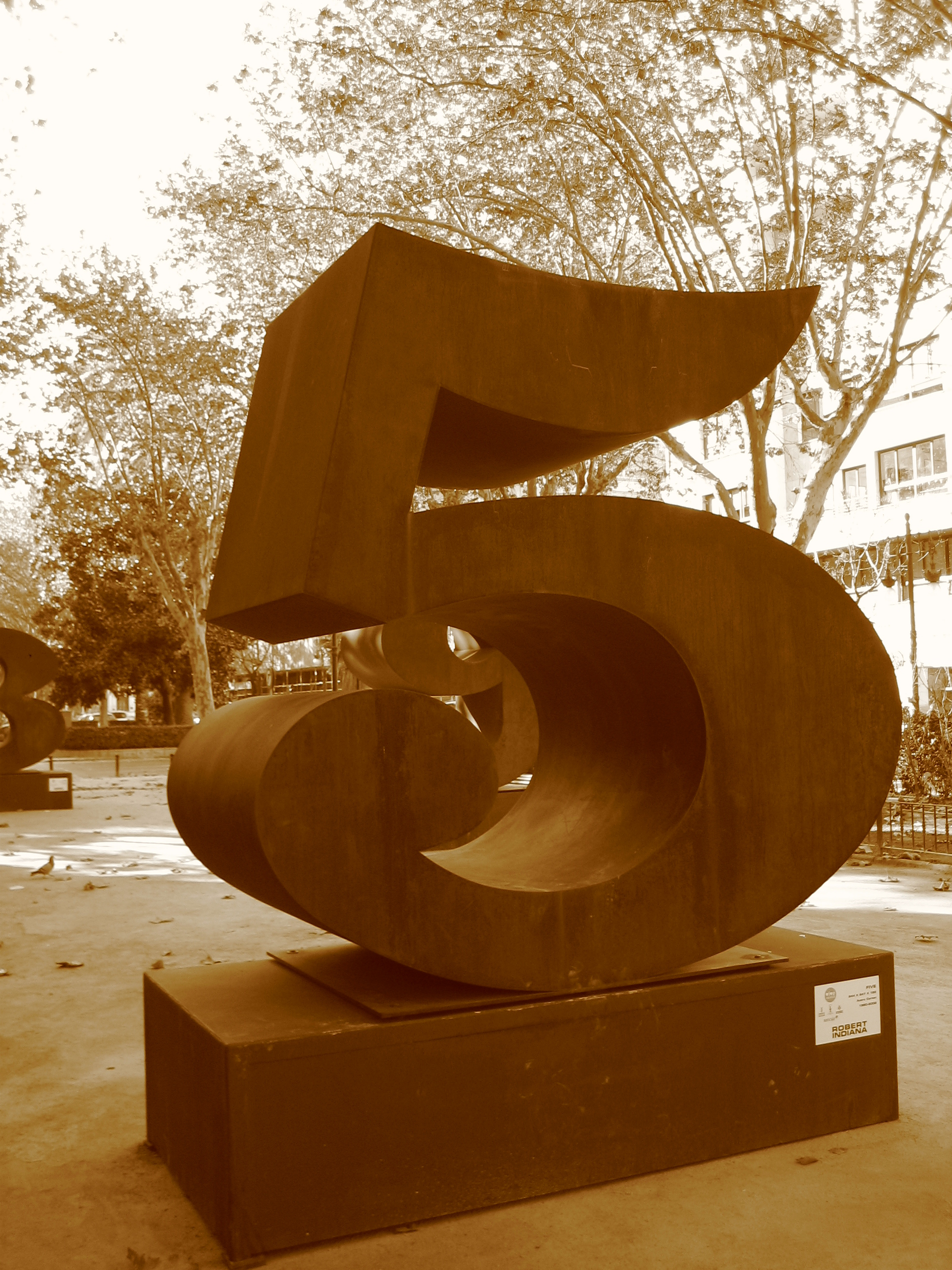
No. 5 in COR-TEN in Valencia in 2006

One Through Zero (The Ten Numbers) is a monumental series of sculptures by the American artist Robert Indiana. The work depicts the numerical digits 1, 2, 3, 4, 5, 6, 7, 8, and 9 and 0. The work was created between 1980 and 2001. The numbers are made from polychrome aluminium with each measuring 72 x 72 x 36 in. (182.9 x 182.9 x 91.4 cm.).

The use of numbers became prominent in Indiana's artworks from the end of the 1950s and became an established part of his style in the 1960s. The design of the numbers was inspired by a printer's calendar Indiana found in his loft in Coenties Slip. The piece was first created for a property developer in Indianapolis; the work was then donated to the Indianapolis Museum of Art. The work was subsequently created for a siting in Park Avenue in New York City in 2003 as part of the 'Art on the Park' series, outside Beverly Hills City Hall in 2005, and on Lime Street, London from 2013 as part of the City of London's 'Sculpture in the City' series. An edition of One Through Zero (The Ten Numbers) made from COR-TEN steel was displayed in London's Regent's Park in 2019.

Indiana had previously created a work with the poet Robert Creeley of a book of poems with poems about each number facing Indiana's screen printed coloured numbers.

== Interpretation and meaning ==
The digits can be arranged in any order to generate new meanings and interpretations.

Indiana ascribed particular meanings to the colours that he chose for each digit.

Indiana's website ascribes the meanings as:

- One: Red and blue, associated with birth
- Two: Green and blue, signifying infancy
- Three: Orange and blue representing youth
- Four: Yellow and red, connected to adolescence
- Five: White and blue signifying the 'pre-prime' of life
- Six: Green and red signifying the prime of life
- Seven: Blue and orange suggesting the 'early autumn' of life
- Eight: Purple and red signalling autumn
- Nine: Black and yellow conveying a sense of warning
- Ten: The use of grey signals the end of the biological life cycle
