= MECCA floor =

Pop art by Robert Indiana

MECCA Floor is a pop art painting by American artist Robert Indiana that was painted on the wooden floor used by the Milwaukee Bucks and Marquette Warriors (now Golden Eagles) basketball teams from 1977 to 1988 in both teams' home venue of the MECCA (Milwaukee Exposition, Convention Center and Arena; now known as UW–Milwaukee Panther Arena).

== Floor beginnings ==
In 1977, Robert Indiana talked with Steve Marcus about painting a floor for basketball court in Milwaukee. On October 4, 1977, the Milwaukee Bucks first game on their new floor against the Chicago Bulls. On October 18, 1977, the Bucks first Regular season game on the new floor against The Los Angeles Lakers.

== Floor departures ==
When the Bucks and Warriors (Note: Marquette did not adopt its current nickname of Golden Eagles until 1992.) moved to the new Bradley Center in 1988, the MECCA arena floor was moved to storage, all but forgotten by the general public.

== Floor return ==
In 2010, Bucks fans Andy Gorzalski, Jim Paschke, and John Steinmiller sent an email to Ben Koller, Robert Indiana's representative, proposing a team-up with Indiana to re-construct and re-exhibit the floor. On August 23, 2013, the MECCA Floor returned and served as the inspiration for the Milwaukee Bucks to redesign a new home court floor for their 2013-14 NBA season based on the original design. On October 26, 2017, the Bucks played on their MECCA Floor in the game against the Boston Celtics in honor of their 50th anniversary in the NBA.

== Legacy ==
In 2014, an ESPN 30 for 30 short film was announced about the making of the MECCA floor. During the 2018-19 Bucks season, their first at Bradley Center's replacement of Fiserv Forum, they announced that they would wear the MECCA floor on Milwaukee's "City" uniform.\
