= Lane's Island =

Island in Knox County, Maine, United States

Coordinates: 44°02′17″N 68°50′01″W

Lane's Island is an island which is part of the town of Vinalhaven in Knox County, Maine, United States. It is approximately 45 acres in size and connected by causeway to mainland Vinalhaven. About two-thirds of the island is protected by a nature preserve. It is named after Captain Timothy Lane, an early European settler of the island. The island contains 1.5 miles of hiking trails.
