= Angela Adams =

American rug designer (born 1965)

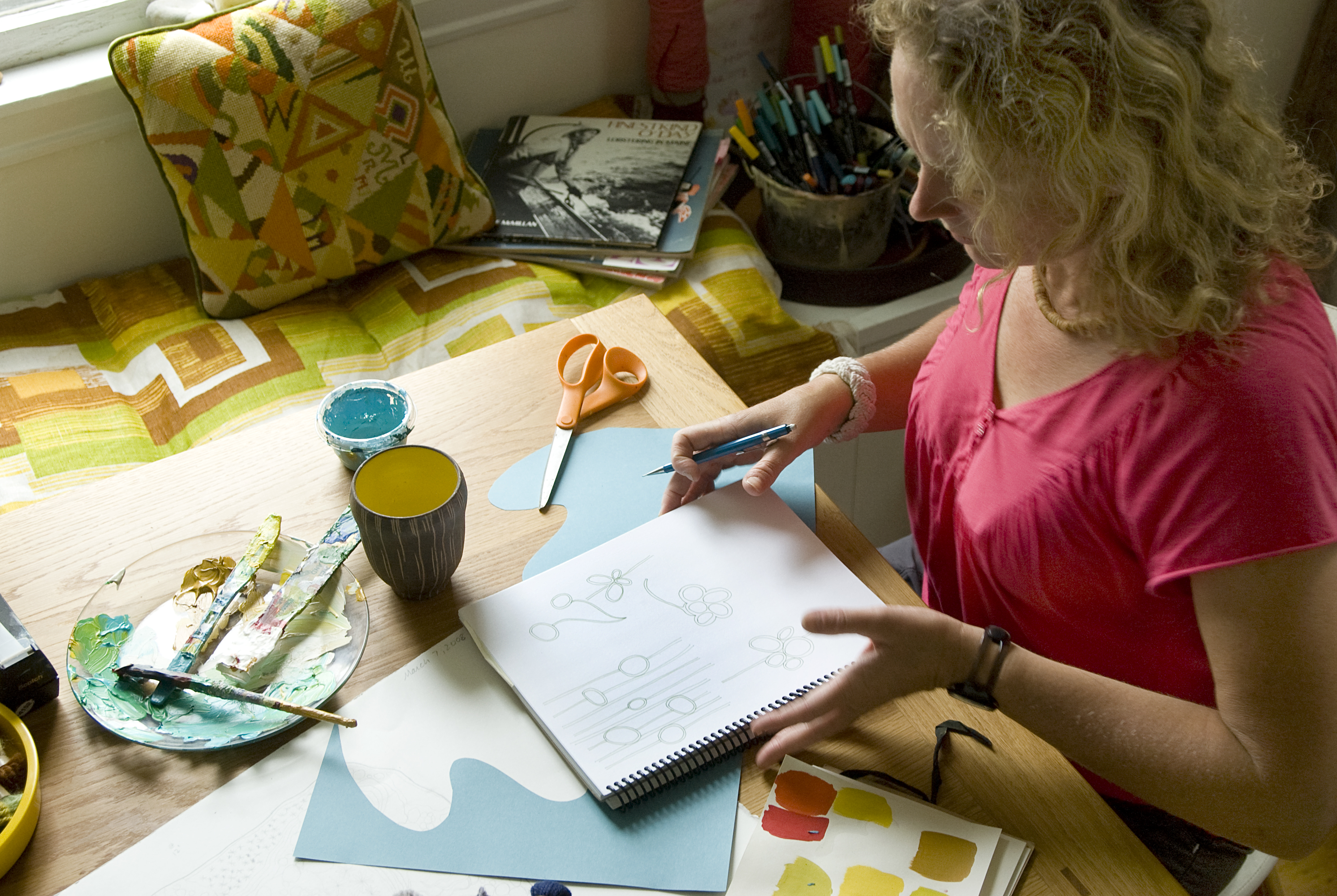
- Angela Adams in 2009
- Born: 1965 (age 60–61); North Haven, Maine, US
- Known for: Rug designs
- Spouse: Sherwood Hamill
- Website: angelaadams.com

Angela Adams (born 1965 on the island of North Haven, Maine) is an American rug designer. Adams partnered with her husband and furniture designer, Sherwood Hamill, to launch a website dedicated to the creation of custom rugs and custom furniture in Portland, Maine.

In 2002, Adams and Hamill opened the first Angela Adams retail store in Portland, Maine. In addition to creating rugs and furniture, the design house developed a line of paper goods, bedding, home accessories, lifestyle accessories and gifts. Adams delivers an "optimistic view of the world spoken through a language of color and pattern," drawing on the natural surroundings of living in Coastal Maine.

Since launching the brand, Angela Adams has designed products for several companies, including J.Crew, Macy's, Anthropologie, and Bed, Bath & Beyond. In addition, there has been a fabric line developed with Architex Fabrics, a wallcovering line developed with MDC, a carpet line developed with Shaw Industries and a tile line developed with Ann Sacks.

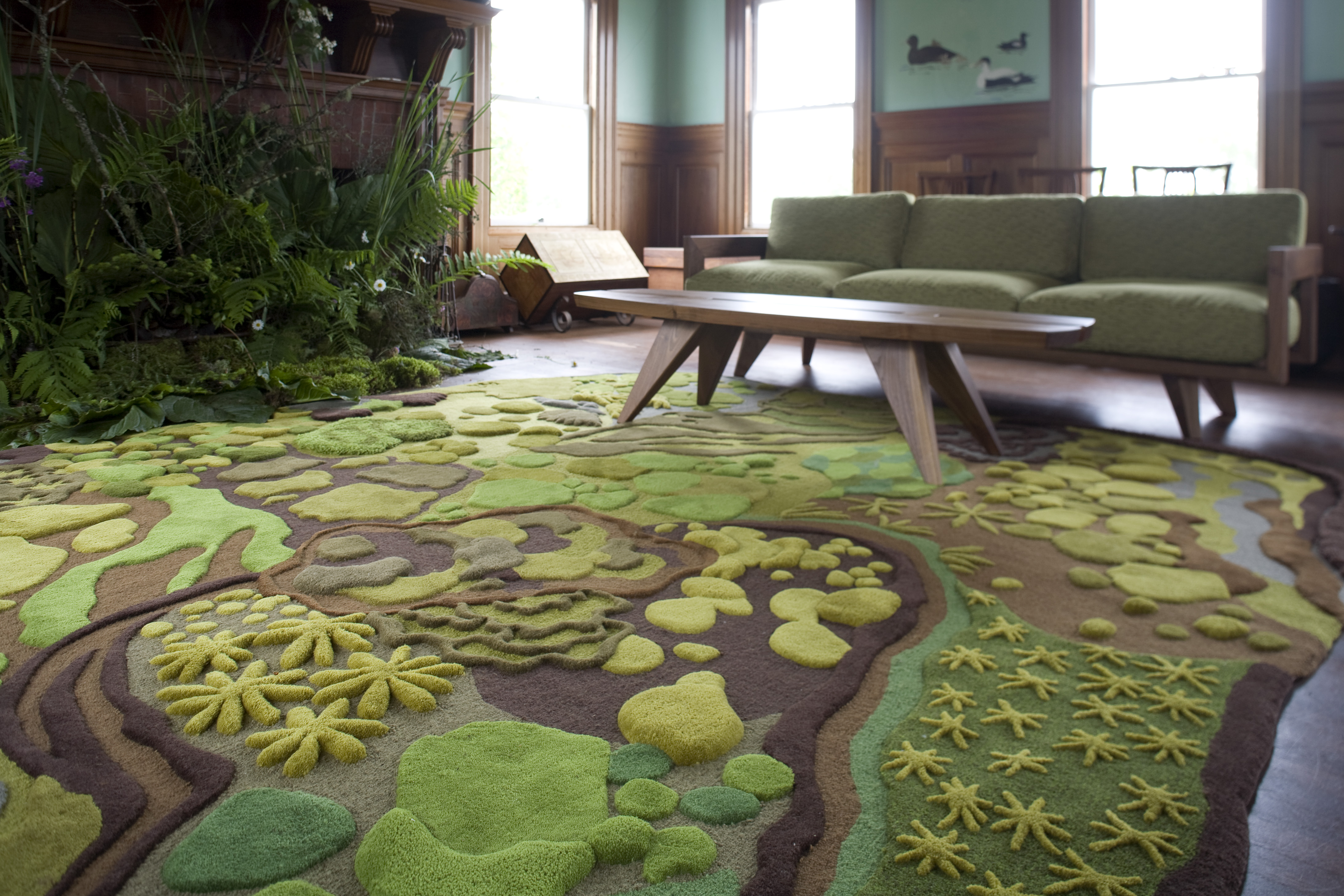
Forest Floor Treasure tapestry, Munjoy Sofa, Munjoy Coffee Table

In 2009, Angela Adams was recognized by the American Society of Interior Designers for her contributions to the interior design profession.

Her collections recently include Astral Garden (2016), Inner Nature (2017) and The Studies Collection (2018).

In April 2018 they opened their Studio Showroom in Portland, Maine's East Bayside neighborhood, merging their design studio with their showroom, offices, and furniture shop. The space also incorporates the work of local Maine artists.
