= Union Church of Vinalhaven =

Historic church in Maine, United States

- U.S. National Register of Historic Places
- Location within Maine Location within the United States
- Location: E. Main St., Vinalhaven, Maine
- Coordinates: 44°2′54″N 68°49′52″W
- Area: 0.3 acres (0.12 ha)
- Built: 1899
- Built by: Otto Nelson
- Architect: John Calvin Stevens
- Architectural style: Shingle Style
- NRHP reference No.: 84001388
- Added to NRHP: July 19, 1984

The Union Church of Vinalhaven is a historic church on East Main Street in the center of Vinalhaven, Maine. Built in 1899, it is a high quality example of Shingle style architecture, designed by one of its major promoters, John Calvin Stevens. It was listed on the National Register of Historic Places in 1984.

== Description and history ==
The Union Church stands on the south side of East Main Street in downtown Vinalhaven, just east of its junction with Atlantic Avenue. The church is a single-story wood-frame structure, with a gabled roof and shingled exterior. The long side of the building faces the street, with a square tower projecting at the right end. The tower rises to a louvered belfry and a pyramidal roof, whose corners have projecting hip sections over the piers that flank the belfry louvers. The main entrance is at the base of the tower, sheltered by a gabled porch. A wide wall dormer is set in the center of that facade, with a tripartite Gothic window. The west-facing gable end is also adorned with a large Gothic window, with small oriel windows on either side.

The church was built by Otto Nelson according to a design by Stevens, who was Maine's best-known architect of the turn of the 20th century. Stevens was a major promoter of the Shingle style, and this church is an excellent example of the style. It was built to replace an earlier structure, built in 1860 when Vinalhaven was a major center for granite quarrying and shipping.

== See also ==
- National Register of Historic Places listings in Knox County, Maine
