= Star of Hope Lodge =

- U.S. National Register of Historic Places
- Location within Maine Location within the United States
- Location: Main St., Vinalhaven, Maine
- Coordinates: 44°2′52″N 68°49′59″W
- Area: 0.3 acres (0.12 ha)
- Built: 1885
- Architectural style: Second Empire
- NRHP reference No.: 82000767
- Added to NRHP: February 19, 1982

The Star of Hope Lodge is a historic former commercial and fraternal society building on Main Street in downtown Vinalhaven, Maine. Built in 1885, this large Second Empire building is one of a few commercial buildings to survive in the island community. It was restored in the 1980s by artist Robert Indiana for use as an art gallery and studio space. It was listed on the National Register of Historic Places in 1982.

== Description and history ==
The former Star of Hope Lodge building stands on the north side of Main Street in the center of Vinalhaven's main village. It is a large three-story wood-frame structure, with a mansard roof and clapboarded exterior. The street-facing facade has two storefronts flanking a central entrance, which is in a slightly projecting section topped by a mansard turret. The entrance is recessed, the sheltering section of the projection supported by large Italianate brackets. Windows on the upper floors are topped by bracketed and gabled pediments, and the steep sections of the mansard roof have wall dormers with long paired windows with rounded tops. A Palladian style window adorns that level in the central projecting section. The storefronts each consist of display windows on either side of a recessed entry.

The hall was built in 1885 by the local chapter of the Independent Order of Odd Fellows (IOOF), a fraternal society, with retail space on the ground floor, and club meeting spaces above. It is one of Vinalhaven's few surviving reminders of its economic height in the 1880s, when granite from the island was shipped to many parts of the eastern United States. After the IOOF ceased activity, the building was acquired by photographer Eliot Elisofon as a studio space, which he later rented to Robert Indiana. Indiana purchased the building after Elisofon died, and oversaw its rehabilitation. Following his death in 2018, the building was transferred to the foundation specified in his will, Star of Hope Inc.

== See also ==
- National Register of Historic Places listings in Knox County, Maine
