= Knox County Regional Airport =

Public regional airport in Knox County, Maine

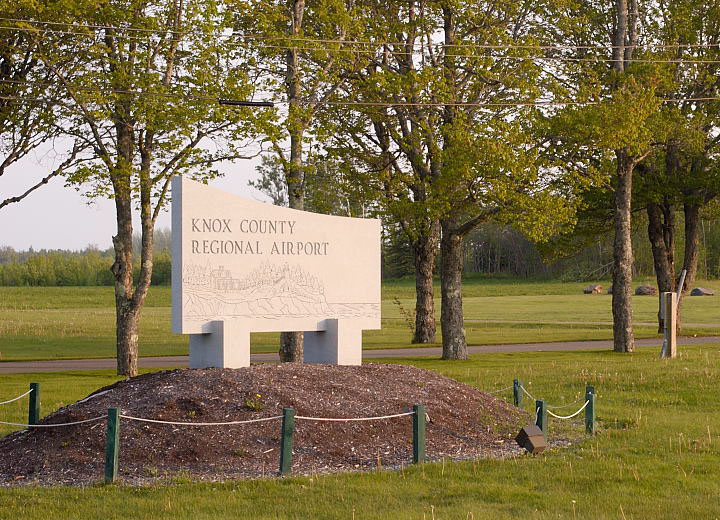
- IATA: RKD; ICAO: KRKD; FAA LID: RKD

Summary
- Airport type: Public
- Owner: Knox County
- Serves: Rockland, Maine
- Elevation AMSL: 56 ft (17 m)
- Coordinates: 44°03′36″N 069°05′57″W
- Website: http://knoxcountymaine.gov/index.asp?Type=B_BASIC&SEC={CC504E7C-164D-470F-B75E-5569CACFD927

Map
- Interactive map of Knox County Regional Airport

Runways
Direction	Length		Surface
Direction	ft	m	Surface
13/31	5,412	1,650	Asphalt
3/21	4,000	1,219	Asphalt

Statistics (2020)
- Aircraft operations: 38,889
- Based aircraft: 67
- Source: Federal Aviation Administration

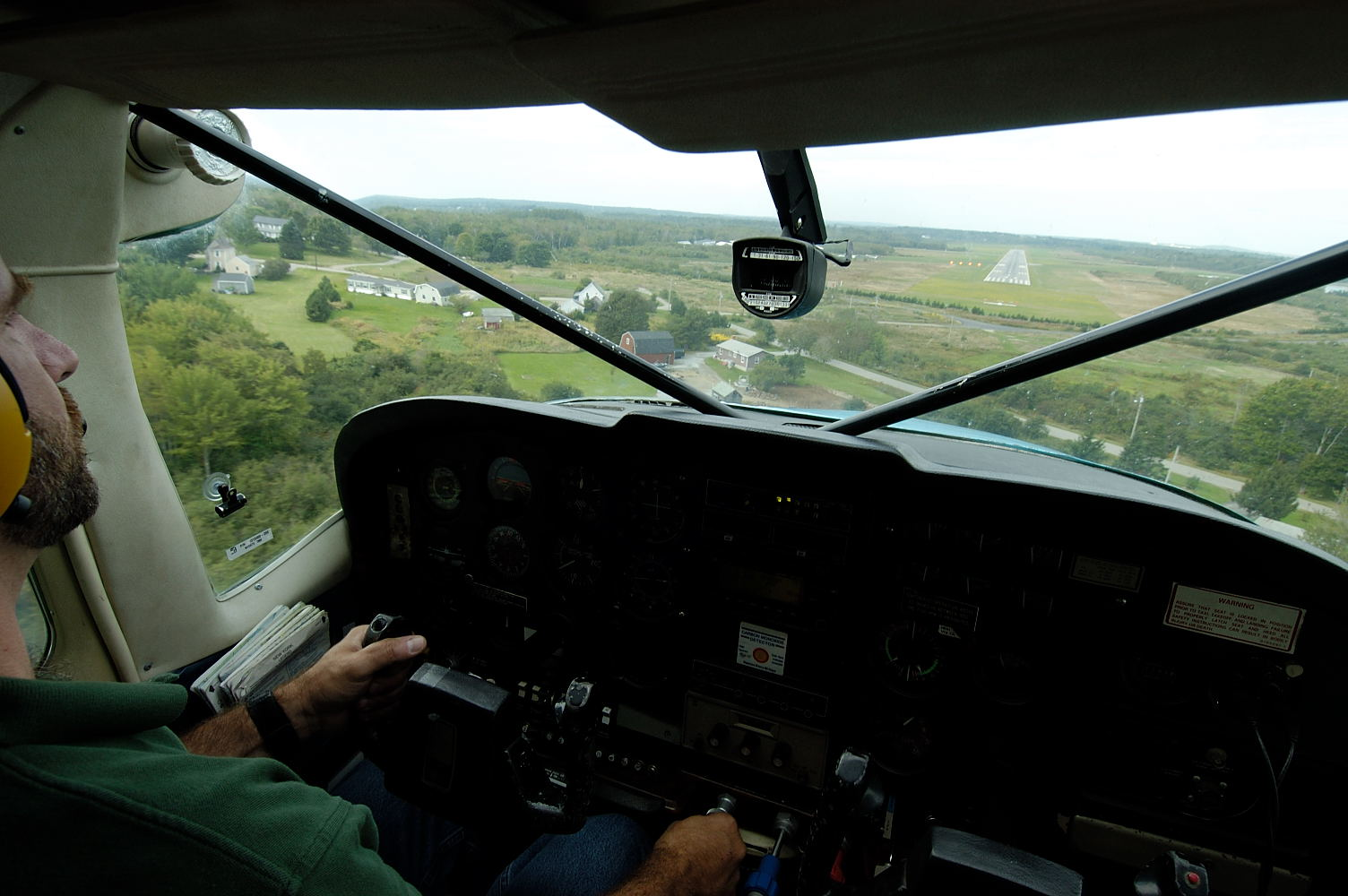
Approaching the runway for landing over Ash Point Road

Knox County Regional Airport (IATA: RKD, ICAO: KRKD, FAA LID: RKD) is a county-owned, public-use airport in the town of Owls Head, Knox County, Maine, United States. It is located three nautical miles (6 km) south of the central business district of Rockland, Maine. The airport serves the residents of midcoast Maine with commercial and charter aviation services. Scheduled airline service is subsidized by the Essential Air Service program. It is also a major hub of freight and mail service to Maine's island communities including Matinicus, North Haven and Vinalhaven.

As per Federal Aviation Administration records, the airport had 13,866 passenger boardings (enplanements) in calendar year 2008, 14,461 enplanements in 2009, and 17,657 in 2010. It is included in the National Plan of Integrated Airport Systems for 2011–2015, which categorized it as a primary commercial service airport (more than 10,000 enplanements per year).

During the summer months, the airport is one of Maine's busiest, with significant private jet operations bringing visitors to the numerous summer colonies in the Penobscot Bay region. Penobscot Island Air is also based at the airport. The influx in traffic in recent years prompted the implementation of a voluntary night curfew on arrivals and departures between 10:30 p.m. and 6:00 a.m.

Owls Head Transportation Museum is also situated at the airport on the remains of runway 17/35, a third runway that is now abandoned. It has a museum of antique autos, aircraft, and engines. During the summer special event gatherings are held for enthusiasts.

== History ==
The airport was built during World War II and became locally known as the "Ash Point Naval Air Station" while officially operating as Rockland Naval Auxiliary Air Facility (NAAF) from April 15, 1943, until February 1, 1946. With the familiar triangle of runways (the third runway was discontinued in the 1970s) it was one of a string of military airports along the Maine coast supporting operations of Naval Air Station Brunswick.

After the war, it was operated by the City of Rockland until 1968. It was then turned over to Knox County and renamed Knox County Regional Airport. Since that time, the airport has been developed, the runways expanded, and an Instrument Landing System (ILS) was installed.

== Facilities and aircraft ==
Knox County Regional Airport covers an area of 538 acres (218 ha) at an elevation of 56 feet (17 m) above mean sea level. It has two asphalt paved runways: 13/31 is 5,412 by 100 feet (1,650 × 30 m) and 3/21 is 4,000 by 100 feet (1,219 × 30 m).

For the year ending December 31, 2020, the airport had 38,889 aircraft operations, an average of 106 per day: 67% general aviation, 25% air taxi, 7% scheduled commercial, and <1% military. At that time there were 67 aircraft based at this airport: 62 single-engine, 1 multi-engine, 3 jet, and 1 glider.

== Airlines and destinations ==
=== Passenger ===
Airlines	Destinations
Cape Air	Boston

== Accidents and incidents ==
- On May 30, 1979, Downeast Flight 46 crashed on approach to the airport when the pilots descended below the minimum allowable altitude in difficult weather and failed to correct their error. 16 passengers and crew out of the 17 on board were killed, 1 passenger survived the crash.

== See also ==
- List of airports in Maine

== Other sources ==
- Essential Air Service documents (Docket OST-1997-2784) from the U.S. Department of Transportation:
  - Order 2004-10-16 (October 25, 2004): reselecting Colgan Air, Inc., to provide subsidized Essential Air Service (EAS) at Presque Isle/Houlton, Augusta/Waterville, Bar Harbor and Rockland, Maine, for a two-year period at a combined annual subsidy rate of $4,312,849.
  - Order 2006-8-24 (August 25, 2006): reselecting Colgan Air, Inc., operating as US Airways Express, to provide subsidized essential air service (EAS) at Presque Isle/Houlton, Augusta/Waterville, Bar Harbor, and Rockland, Maine, at a total annual subsidy rate of $4,774,068 ($3,572,592 for Augusta/Waterville, Bar Harbor, and Rockland; $1,201,476 for Presque Isle/Houlton), for the two-year period of November 1, 2006, through October 31, 2008.
  - Order 2008-7-35 (July 31, 2008): selecting Hyannis Air Service, Inc. d/b/a Cape Air (Cape Air) to provide subsidized EAS at Rockland, Maine, at an annual subsidy of $1,522,770, for a two-year period beginning when Cape Air inaugurates full EAS, through the end of the 24th month thereafter.
  - Order 2010-9-28 (September 28, 2010): selecting Hyannis Air Service, Inc., operating as Cape Air, to provide essential air service (EAS) at Augusta/Waterville and Rockland, Maine, for the four-year period from November 1, 2010, to October 31, 2014, for a combined annual subsidy of $2,783,161, and Colgan Air Inc., operating as US Airways Express, to provide EAS at Bar Harbor, Maine, for the two-year period from November 1, 2010, to October 31, 2012, for an annual subsidy of $2,298,533.
