= Vinalhaven School =

Location
- 22 Arcola Lane; Vinalhaven, Maine; United States
- Coordinates: 44°2′55″N 68°49′19″W

Information
- Type: Public
- Superintendent: Katrina Kane
- Principal: TBD
- Teaching staff: 21.50 (FTE)
- Grades: K–12
- Enrollment: 150 (2023-2024)
- Student to teacher ratio: 6.98
- Colors: Red, White
- Mascot: Vikings
- Yearbook: The Exile
- Website: vinalhavenschool.org

Vinalhaven School is a kindergarten-through-twelfth-grade public school located at 22 Arcola Lane, Vinalhaven, an island located in mid-coast Maine, 75 miles east northeast of Portland. Vinalhaven School is divided into five teams: the K-2 Team, 3-5 Team, Middle School Team, High School Team and Discovery Team. The Discovery Team consists of the drama, music, art, physical education and technology departments. The superintendent is Katrina Kane, and the principal is TBD.

== Athletics ==
Vinalhaven School is a member of the East/West Conference, which is a group of Class D schools in Maine. Vinalhaven School teams include Men's and Women's Basketball; Men's and Women's Soccer; Cross Country; Men's Baseball; Women's Softball, and the Rowing Crew. In 2007 the Lady Vikings Basketball team were the runners-up of the Western Maine Class D Finals, and Men's Vikings Soccer were the runners-up of the Western Maine Class D Finals. Vikings Crew placed first in Boston's Ice Breaker in 2005, 2007 and 2008. In 2010, the Men's Vikings Basketball team were the runners-up of the Western Maine Class D Finals.
