= Moses Webster House =

Historic house in Maine, United States

- U.S. National Register of Historic Places
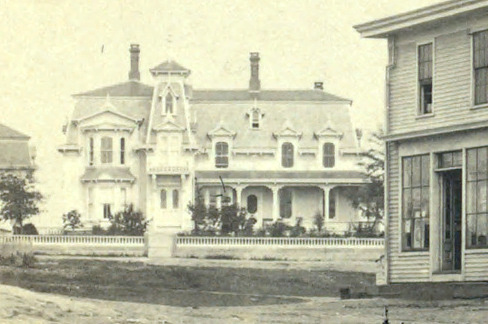
- 19th-century image of the house

- Location within Maine Location within the United States
- Location: 14 Atlantic Ave., 0.05 mi. E of jct. of Main St. and Atlantic Ave., Vinalhaven, Maine
- Coordinates: 44°2′50.5″N 68°49′52″W
- Area: less than one acre
- Built: 1873
- Architectural style: Second Empire
- NRHP reference No.: 98000309
- Added to NRHP: April 1, 1998

The Moses Webster House is a historic house at 14 Atlantic Avenue in Vinalhaven, Maine. It was built in 1873 for Moses Webster, owner of one of Vinalhaven's granite quarries, and is one of the community's finest examples of Second Empire architecture. It was listed on the National Register of Historic Places in 1998.

== Description and history ==
The Moses Webster House stands on the east side of Vinalhaven's downtown area, at the northeast corner of Atlantic Avenue and Frog Hollow Road. It is a large 2 1/2-story wood-frame structure, with a mansard roof, clapboarded walls, and a granite foundation. Its front facade is six bays wide, with a projecting two-bay section on the left side, capped by a three-story mansarded tower. The leftmost bay has a two-story polygonal window bay with a gabled top and bracketed cornices, while a single-story porch extends across the right four bays and wraps around to the right side. It is supported by chamfered square posts and has a low balustrade. Second-floor windows rise through the lower portion of the mansard roof as wall dormers, and are topped by bracketed and pedimented gables.

The house was built in 1873 for Moses Webster, who was, along with Joseph R. Bodwell, a leading figure in Vinalhaven's highly successful late 19th-century granite industry. The two men, both New Hampshire natives, came to Vinalhaven in 1851, and began the expansion of its previously small-scale granite quarries, eventually providing stone for major buildings along the Atlantic coast. The Bodwell Granite Company, of which Webster was president and co-owner, dominated the island's economy into the early 20th century. The house served as a bed and breakfast inn in the early 2010s, and was listed for sale in 2016.

== See also ==
- National Register of Historic Places listings in Knox County, Maine
