= Murch Family House =

Historic house in Maine, United States

- U.S. National Register of Historic Places
- Location within Maine Location within the United States
- Location: Southeast side of Calderwood Neck, Vinalhaven, Maine
- Coordinates: 44°6′0″N 68°49′5″W
- Area: 1.7 acres (0.69 ha)
- Built: 1855
- Built by: William Murch
- Architectural style: Greek Revival
- NRHP reference No.: 93000205
- Added to NRHP: March 25, 1993

The Murch Family House is a historic house on Calderwood Neck in Vinalhaven, Maine. Built in 1855, it is the only granite house in a community long known for its granite quarries, and one of a relatively small number of documented stone houses in the state. It was listed on the National Register of Historic Places in 1993.

== Description and history ==
The town of Vinalhaven occupies an eponymous island in Penobscot Bay, located on the central coast of Maine. The island has many deep indentations, two of which define its northeastern lobe, which is known as Calderwood Neck. The Murch House is located on the southeastern part of Calderwood Neck, overlooking the channel that separates it from Penobscot Island. The house is a 1 1/2-story Cape style structure, built out of ashlar granite blocks, and covered by a gabled roof. The front facade is three bays wide, with a pair of sash windows flanking the entrance, offset to the right side of the facade. The interior is divided into four rooms on the ground floor, with a central chimney. Stairs leading up to the attic space are located along the north wall, in the chamber accessed from the main entrance. Also on the property is a 19th-century barn. It is long rectangular timber-frame structure, with a saltbox profile, that is set on sloping terrain with a fully exposed granite block foundation at the rear.

Built about 1855, the house is the only documented granite dwelling on the island, which was well known in the 19th century for its granite. At the time of its construction, the quarries were just beginning to be exploited. This house was built by William Murch, a local mason, using stone quarried from a nearby outcrop. The house was owned for many years by members of the Murch family, who were typically fishermen also engage in subsistence-level farming.

== See also ==
- National Register of Historic Places listings in Knox County, Maine

Other stone houses in Maine:

- Stone House (Bridgton, Maine)
- Nelson Family Farm
- Theodore Jellison House
