= Robert Indiana =

American artist (1928–2018)

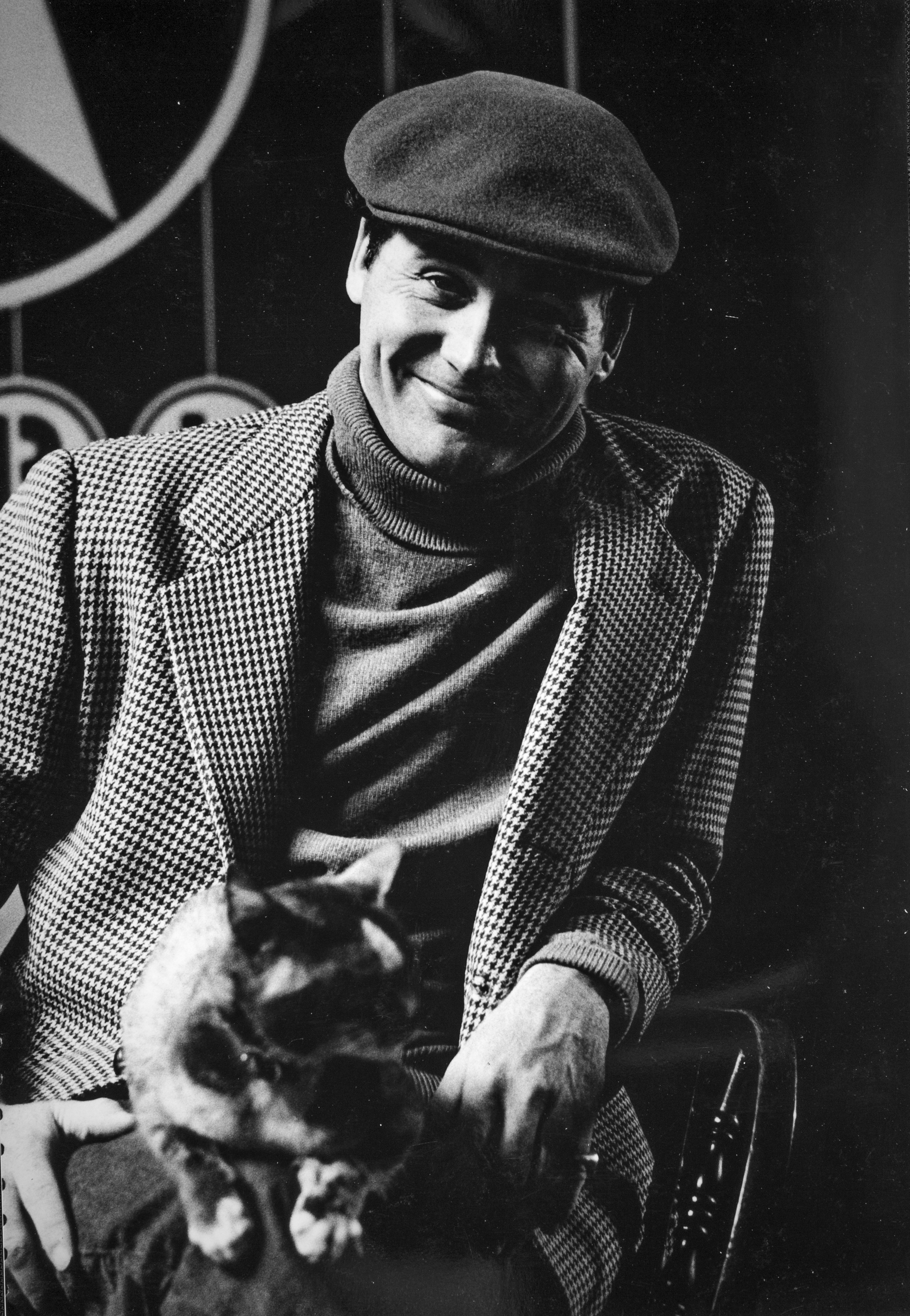
- Robert Indiana. Photo by Dennis Griggs
- Born: Robert Clark; September 13, 1928; New Castle, Indiana, U.S.
- Died: May 19, 2018 (aged 89); Vinalhaven, Maine, U.S.
- Education: Herron School of Art and Design, Arsenal Technical High School, Art Institute of Chicago, Skowhegan School of Painting and Sculpture, Edinburgh College of Art
- Occupations: Painter, sculptor, printmaker, theatrical set designer and costume designer
- Works: LOVE; MECCA floor
- Movement: Pop art, Hard-edge painting

Robert Indiana (born Robert Clark; September 13, 1928 – May 19, 2018) was an American painter, sculptor and printmaker, associated with the pop art movement.

Indiana is mostly known for his iconic image LOVE which was first created in 1964 in the form of a card. Indiana sent these cards to several friends and acquaintances in the art world. In 1965, Robert Indiana was invited to propose an artwork to be featured on the Museum of Modern Art's annual Christmas card. Indiana submitted several 12” square oil on canvas variations based on his LOVE image. The museum selected the most intense color combination in red, blue, and green. It became one of the most popular cards the museum has ever offered. Indiana continued to develop his LOVE series, and in 1966, worked with Marian Goodman of Multiples, Inc. to make his first LOVE sculpture in aluminum. In 1970, Indiana completed his first monumental LOVE sculpture in Cor-Ten steel which is in the collection of the Indianapolis Museum of Art.

Indiana has also been a focal point of the LGBTQ rights movement after it was disclosed that his famous LOVE artwork was the result of the breakup between him and artist Ellsworth Kelly, who inspired Indiana's style of work.

In addition to being a painter and sculptor, Indiana made posters and prints and also designed stage sets and costumes for the Virgil Thompson and Gertrude Stein opera The Mother of Us All. Indiana's artwork has been featured in numerous exhibitions around the world and is included in the permanent collections of many major museums including the Museum of Modern Art, New York; Tate Modern, London; and the San Francisco Museum of Modern Art.

== Biography ==
Robert Indiana was born Robert Clark in New Castle, Indiana, and was adopted as an infant by Earl Clark and Carmen Watters. After his parents divorced, he relocated to Indianapolis to live with his father so he could attend Arsenal Technical High School (1942–1946), from which he graduated as valedictorian of his class.

After serving for three years in the United States Army Air Forces, Indiana studied at the Art Institute of Chicago (1949–1953), the Skowhegan School of Painting and Sculpture in Maine (summer 1953) and Edinburgh University and Edinburgh College of Art (1953–1954). He returned to the United States in 1954 and settled in New York City.

In New York, Indiana's romantic partner Ellsworth Kelly, whom he met in 1956, helped him find a loft on Coenties Slip. On Coenties Slip, Kelly introduced Indiana to neighboring artists like Jack Youngerman, Agnes Martin and Cy Twombly, with whom he shared his studio for a time. It was around this time when Indiana and Kelly established their romantic relationship. Kelly would go on to become a mentor for Indiana, and later persuade him to make the shift to the hard-edged style that quickly became popular.

An interview with Indiana later in life revealed that Indiana only saw himself as equal with Kelly. Although Indiana claims to be inspired by his homefront, The Slip, and Life Magazine, his biggest inspiration of all was Kelly. In 1958 he changed his surname to Indiana. His career took off in the early 1960s after Alfred H. Barr Jr., bought The American Dream, I for the Museum of Modern Art.

In 1964, Indiana moved from Coenties Slip to a five-story building at Spring Street and the Bowery. In the summer of 1969, he visited Life magazine photographer Elliot Elisofon on the Island of Vinalhaven and began renting the upstairs of the 100 year old Victorian-style Odd Fellows Hall named "The Star of Hope" in the island town of Vinalhaven, Maine. Indiana was drawn to the Odd Fellows insignia which consists of three interlocking links.

The three links of course are truth and friendship, and the important link in the middle just happens to be love. So I think I was fated to end my life in an Odd Fellows Lodge — Robert Indiana

Half a century earlier, Marsden Hartley had made his escape to the same island. Indiana discovered a great affinity to Marsden Hartley to whom he pays homage in a series of work in the late 1980s. When Elisofon died in 1973, Indiana bought the lodge for $10,000 from his estate. He moved in full-time when he lost his lease on the Bowery in 1978.

During this same year, Indiana created his most famous piece of art, LOVE, which was created in response to his breakup with Kelly, although this was not disclosed until several years later. This specific piece incorporated three colours, red, green, and blue, the most prominent colours in Kelly's work. However, this piece brought Indiana a lot of unwanted attention. Eventually, Indiana started to fade out of the public spotlight. It is speculated that the attention from LOVE became too much.

Indiana grew reclusive in his final years. He died on May 19, 2018, at his home in Vinalhaven, Maine, of respiratory failure at the age of 89. One day before his death, a lawsuit was filed over claims that his caretaker had isolated him from family and friends, and was marketing unauthorized reproductions of his works.

== Work ==
Indiana's complex and multilayered work explores the power of language, American identity, and personal history, and often consists of striking, simple and direct words. Drawing on the vocabulary of vernacular highway signs and roadside entertainments, Indiana created a body of work that appears bold and energetic. His best known examples include short words like EAT, DIE, HUG, ERR, and LOVE.

In his EAT series, the word blares in paint or light bulbs against a neutral background. In a major career milestone, the architect Philip Johnson commissioned an EAT sign for the New York State Pavilion at the 1964 New York World's Fair. The sign was turned off one day after the opening of the fair because visitors believed it to mark a restaurant. Andy Warhol's contribution to the fair was also removed that day.

Indiana's series of monumental sculptures can be seen across the globe, including LOVE, Imperial LOVE, LOVE Wall, AHAVA, AMOR, and ONE Through ZERO (The Ten Numbers). Indiana's own hard-edged painterly aesthetic paved the way for the later sculptural editions which would translate this into three dimensions. In the aftermath of the September 11, 2001, attacks, Indiana created his series of Peace Paintings which were exhibited at the Paul Kasmin Gallery in New York in 2004.

Between 1989 and 1994, Indiana painted a series of 18 canvases inspired by the shapes and numbers in the War Motif paintings that Marsden Hartley did in Berlin between 1913 and 1915.

Indiana was also a theatrical set and costume designer; he designed Santa Fe Opera's 1976 production of Virgil Thomson's The Mother of Us All, based on the life of suffragist Susan B. Anthony. He was the star of Andy Warhol's film Eat (1964), which is a 45-minute film of Indiana eating a mushroom. Warhol also made the brief silent film Bob Indiana Etc. (4 minutes, 1963), a portrait of the artist with appearances by Wynn Chamberlain and John Giorno.

Indiana's series of monumental sculptures of the digits zero through to nine, ONE Through ZERO (The Ten Numbers) has been displayed in several cities since its 1980 creation.

=== LOVE ===
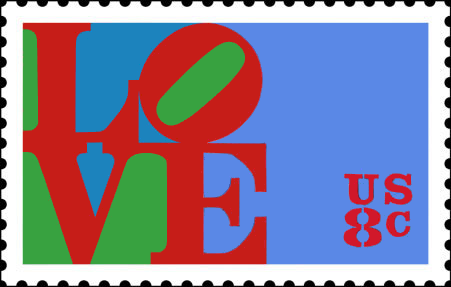
1973 LOVE stamp

Although most famously known for his hard edge artworks, Indiana's work originally focused less on hard edge until he was introduced to Ellsworth Kelly in 1956. Kelly quickly convinced Indiana to move into 25 Coenties Slip, better known as The Slip, where several other artists would later follow including Kelly himself. Other artists like Agnes Martin, Lenore Tawney, Ann Wilson, and Jack Youngerman soon followed. Living at the slip largely influenced Indiana's art, although it would be Ellsworth Kelly who suggested later on to Indiana to make the large shift into hard edge.

Although known for several art pieces, Indiana's best known image is the word love in upper-case letters, arranged in a square with its trademarked tilted letter "O". The iconography first appeared in a series of poems originally written in 1958, in which Indiana stacked LO and VE on top of one another. The first paintings addressing the subject of love were 4-Star Love (1961) and Love Is God (1964).

What many are unaware of is that Indiana's famous LOVE had evolved from a romantic relationship with his inspiration, Kelly. According to art historian Susan Elizabeth Ryan wrote that in 1964 LOVE had been a "more explicit four-letter word — beginning with F, and with a second letter, a U, intriguingly tilted to the right." Indiana and Kelly had been in a rocky relationship and Indiana had been working on word paintings. She adds "The two men were in the habit of exchanging postcard-size sketches, with Mr. Kelly laying down fields of color and Mr. Indiana adding large words atop the abstractions." The 1950s were a critical time for Indiana and his art. Not only did he change his name to avoid confusion with other artists, but Indiana also fell in love with Kelly. This whirlwind romance resulted in Indiana moving into The Slip, as mentioned previously. Not only that, but Indiana's style drastically changed. Indiana claimed that Kelly introduced him to hard edge saying, "This was my first head-on contact with painting of any geometric, or clean hard-edge style." However, after the two artists broke up in 1964 the cruder original artwork was changed by Indiana to the famous stacked LOVE.

Indiana's red, blue, and green LOVE painting was then selected to appear on the Museum of Modern Art’s annual Christmas card in 1965. In an interview Robert Indiana said "It was the most profitable Christmas card the museum ever published."

Indiana said he was inspired to use these colors because his father used to work at a Phillips 66 gas station whose colors were green and red. Robert Indiana described the original colors as "the red and green of that sign against the blue Hoosier sky". Still it is believed the colors were inspired also by the painting Red Blue Green (1963) of Ellsworth Kelly, his former partner.

The colours that dominate Indiana's love painting (red, blue, and green) are also the most prominent colours featured in Kelly's work. In this case, Indiana's work became more than just an art piece, but rather an ode to his former lover as well. As said by journalist Jonathon Jones, [LOVE] "is a sad love poem, perhaps even an angry one. Yet it instantly became a beacon of idealism, optimism, youth and revolt," although information regarding Indiana and Kelly's relationship was not publicly announced until 2013.

Indiana said, "Ellsworth Kelly introduced me to Hard-Edge and was a great influence on my work, and is responsible for my being here".

The first serigraph/silk screen of LOVE was printed as part of an exhibition poster for Stable Gallery in 1966 on the occasion of Indiana's show dedicated to his LOVE series .

In 1973, the United States Postal Service commissioned a stamp design by Indiana and released the eight-cent LOVE stamp in advance of Valentine's Day. Unveiled in a ceremony at the Philadelphia Museum of Art, the stamp became so popular that 425 million were printed over the next two years.

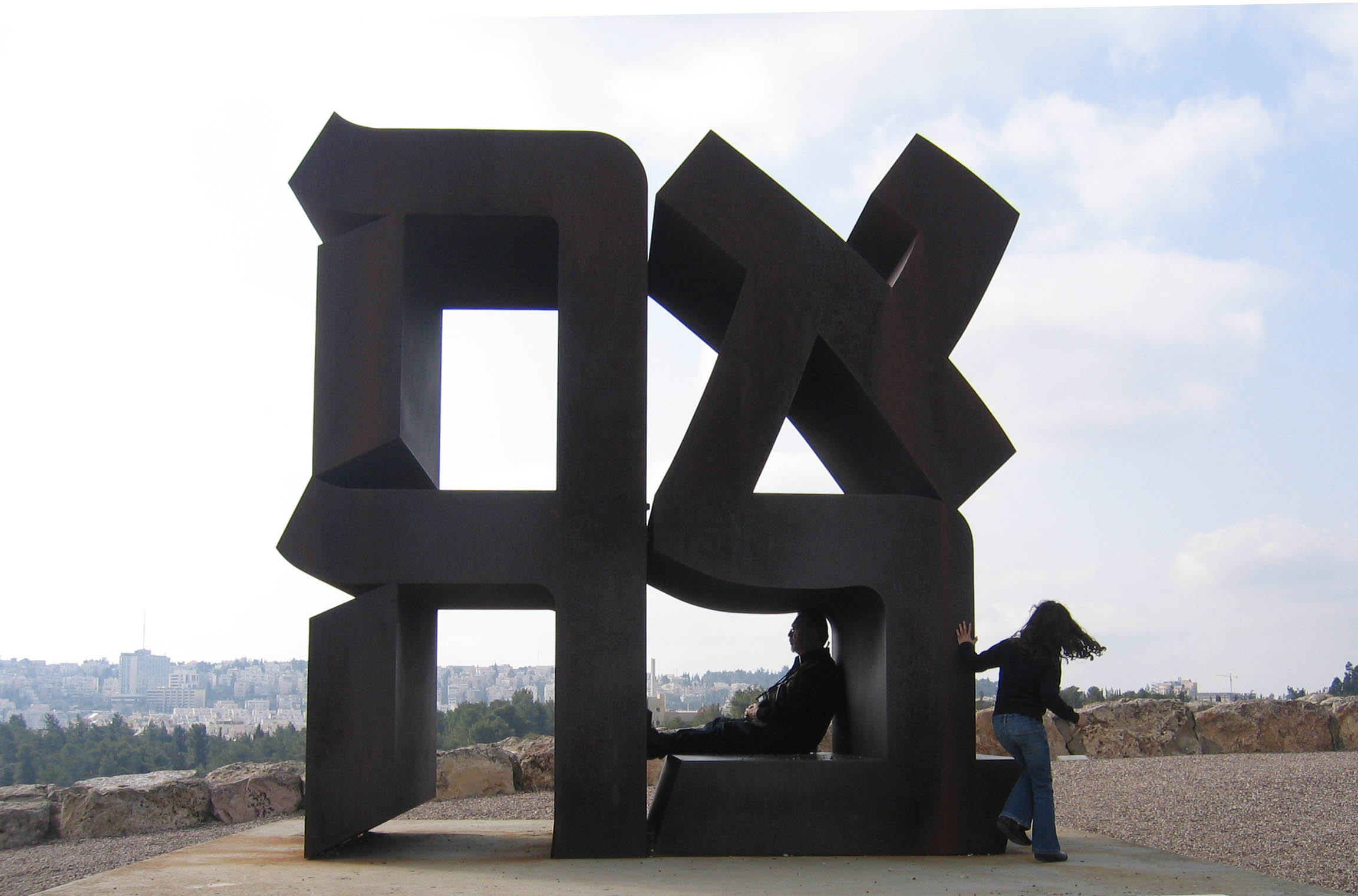
A close view of LOVE in Hebrew (Ahava אהבה) with two people, at The Israel Museum, Jerusalem, taken in 2008

==== Hebrew version ====
In 1977, he created a Hebrew LOVE with the four-letter word Ahava (אהבה "love" in Hebrew) using Cor-Ten steel, for the Israel Museum Art Garden in Jerusalem.

==== Variation for Google ====
For Valentine's Day 2011, Google paid homage to Indiana's LOVE, which was displayed in place of the search engine site's normal logo.

== Exhibitions ==
In 1962, Eleanor Ward's Stable Gallery hosted Robert Indiana's first New York solo exhibition. Indiana's work has been represented by Paul Kasmin Gallery in New York City, Waddington Custot in London and Galerie Gmurzynska in Europe.

From July 4 – September 14, 2008, Indiana's work was the subject of the grand multiple-location exhibition Robert Indiana a Milano; the main exhibition took place at the Padiglione d’Arte Contemporanea (Pavilion of Contemporary Art), and other works were displayed in public piazzas in Milan.

In 2013, the Whitney Museum of American Art mounted a retrospective of his work entitled Robert Indiana: Beyond LOVE, this exhibition traveled to the McNay Art Museum in San Antonio, Texas.

In 2018 the Buffalo AKG Art Museum exhibited Robert Indiana: A Sculpture Retrospective.

The first retrospective of Indiana's sculptures in the United Kingdom, spanning 60 years of the artist's career, opened at the Yorkshire Sculpture Park on March 12, 2022, and ran until January 2023.

== Appearances of his work in popular culture ==
Millions of television viewers saw an orange, brown, and white version of Five, one of Indiana's 1965 Numbers series, featured in an episode of The Mary Tyler Moore Show during the 1971–1972 season, in which Rhoda Morgenstern redecorates Lou Grant's dated living room. Lou, evidently not a fan of pop art, complains to Mary, "I bet she went through four other paintings before choosing this one!"

In 2014, ESPN released MECCA: The Floor That Made Milwaukee Famous, a short film in its 30 for 30 series of sports documentaries. It chronicles how Indiana's floor at the MECCA was saved from being sold for scrap.

== Collections ==
Today, Indiana's artworks are featured in the collections of numerous museums globally, including Museum of Modern Art, New York; Whitney Museum of American Art, New York; Metropolitan Museum of Art, New York; National Gallery of Art, Washington D.C.; Hirshhorn Museum and Sculpture Garden, Washington, D.C.; Smithsonian Museum of American Art, Washington, D.C. Farnsworth Art Museum, Rockland, Maine; Stedelijk Museum, Amsterdam, the Netherlands; McNay Art Museum, San Antonio, Texas; Carnegie Institute, Pittsburgh; Allentown Art Museum of the Lehigh Valley, Allentown, Pennsylvania; Williams College Museum of Art or WCMA, in Williamstown, Massachusetts; Delaware Art Museum, Wilmington; Detroit Institute of Art, Michigan; Baltimore Museum of Art, Maryland; Brandeis Museum, Waltham, Massachusetts; Walker Art Center, Minneapolis; Albright-Knox Gallery, Buffalo, New York; San Francisco Museum of Modern Art, California; the Indianapolis Museum of Art, Indiana; and the Los Angeles County Museum of Art, California; Menil Collection, Houston; Tate Modern, London; Museum Ludwig, Cologne, Germany; Van Abbemuseum, Eindhoven, the Netherlands; Nationalgalerie, Berlin; MUMOK (Museum Moderner Kunst Stiftung Ludwig Wien), Vienna; Art Museum of Ontario, Toronto; and Israel Museum, Jerusalem. among many others.

== Art market ==
In May 2011, a 12-foot LOVE sculpture – one in an edition of three identical pieces – sold for $4.1 million.
