= Vinalhaven, Maine =

Town in Maine, United States

- Town
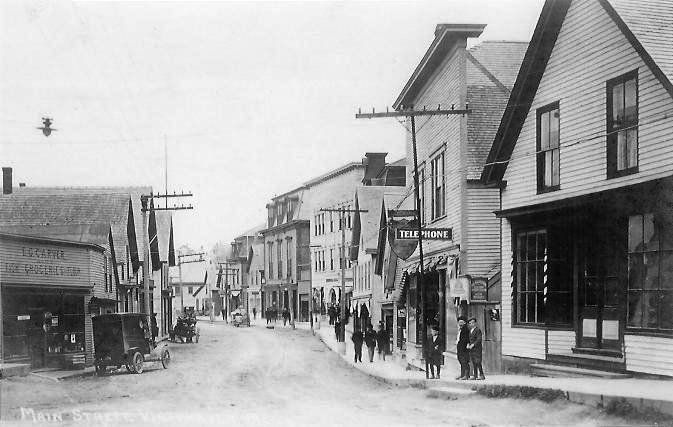
- Main Street c. 1915

- Seal

- Location in Knox County and the state of Maine.
- Coordinates: 44°02′38″N 68°48′54″W
- Country: United States
- State: Maine
- County: Knox
- Incorporated: 1789

Area
  - Total: 168.69 sq mi (436.91 km^{2})
  - Land: 23.46 sq mi (60.76 km^{2})
  - Water: 145.23 sq mi (376.14 km^{2})
- Elevation: 0 ft (0 m)

Population (2020)
  - Total: 1,279
  - Density: 55/sq mi (21.1/km^{2})
- Time zone: UTC−5 (Eastern (EST))
  - Summer (DST): UTC−4 (EDT)
- ZIP Code: 04863
- Area code: 207
- FIPS code: 23-79130
- GNIS feature ID: 582782
- Website: www.townofvinalhaven.org

Vinalhaven is a town in Knox County, Maine, United States. Its town limits include the island of Vinalhaven, the largest of the Fox Islands, and smaller islands, some accessible from Vinalhaven Island by bridge or causeway. The population was 1,279 at the 2020 census. It is home to a thriving lobster fishery and hosts a summer colony. Since there is no bridge to the island, Vinalhaven is primarily accessible from Rockland via an approximately 75-minute state ferry ride across West Penobscot Bay, or by air taxi from Knox County Regional Airport via Penobscot Island Air.

== History ==
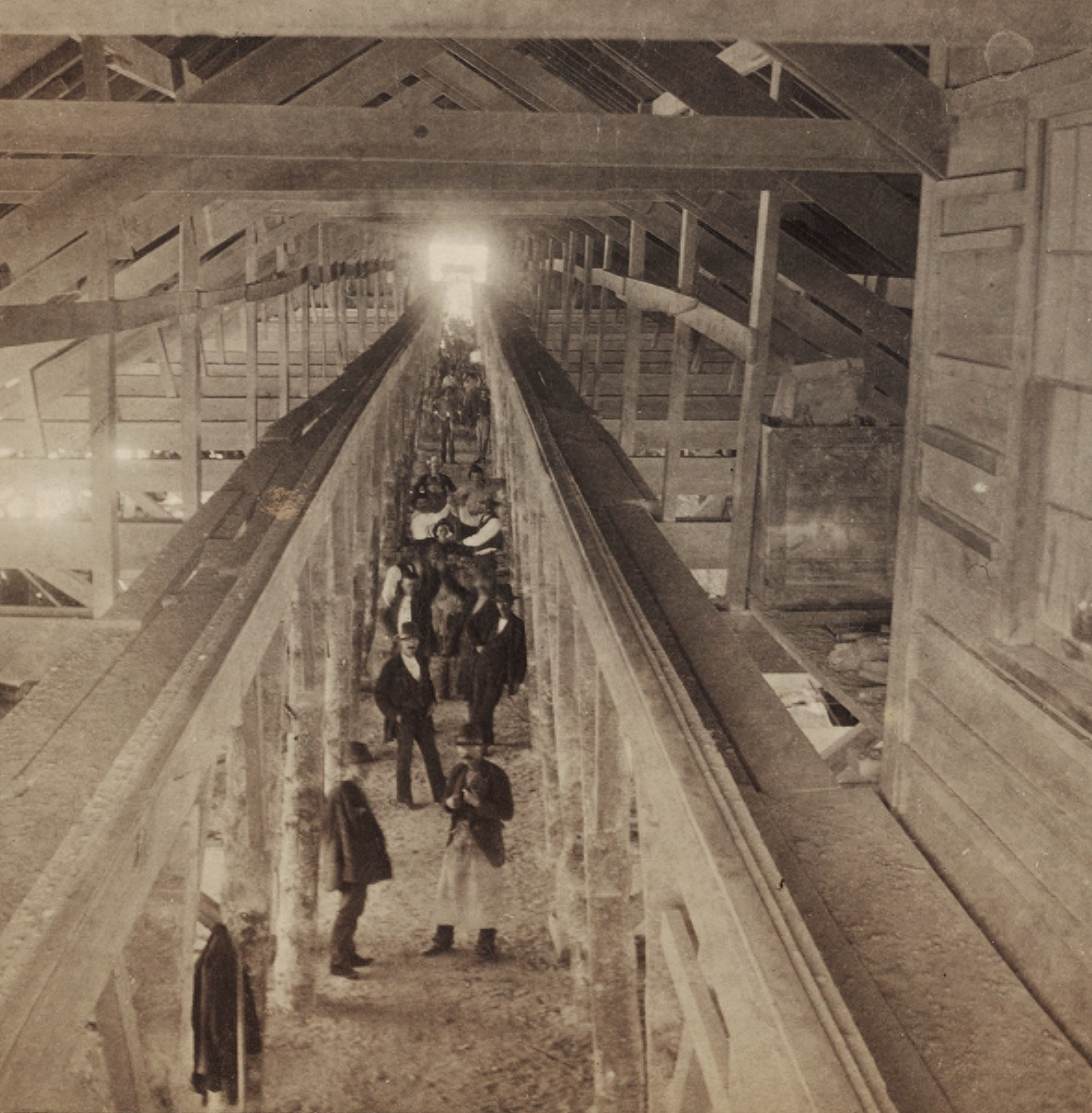
A stone manufactory c. 1880

Archeological remains indicate that the island was first inhabited 3800–5000 years ago by the Red Paint People. Later, it became Abenaki territory. Europeans visited in the 16th century, and English Captain Martin Pring named the archipelago Fox Islands in 1603. The first permanent English settlement occurred in 1766 when Thaddeus Carver arrived from Marshfield, Massachusetts, and later purchased 700 acres (283.3 ha) from Thomas Cogswell on the southern shore near what became known as Carver's Harbor.

Others soon followed to establish the remote fishing and farming community in the Gulf of Maine. Vinalhaven's first Anglo families are considered to be Arey, Calderwood, Carver, Coombs, Dyer, Ginn, Greem, Hopkins, Lane, Leadbetter, Norton, Philbrook, Pierce, Roberts, Smith, Warren, and Vinal. On June 25, 1789, Vinalhaven was incorporated as a town, named for John Vinal. Vinal was not an island resident, but the agent who petitioned the Maine General Court to incorporate the new township; nonetheless the name stuck. In 1847, the North Fox Island seceded and became a separate township called North Haven.

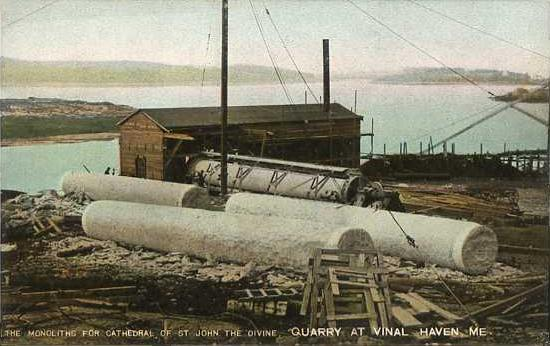
Monolithic columns quarried for the Cathedral of St. John the Divine (installation completed in 1904).

Fishing, shipbuilding, logging and shipping were important early businesses on Vinalhaven. High-quality granite was discovered in 1826, and Vinalhaven became one of Maine's largest quarrying centers for the next century. Today the island is dotted with abandoned quarries, many of which have since filled with groundwater and are popular swimming holes for residents and visitors. Pinkish-gray Vinalhaven granite excavated by the Bodwell Granite Company can be seen in the State Department Building in Washington, the Brooklyn Bridge, and the Union Mutual Life Insurance Building in Boston.

Granite was shipped for customs houses and post offices in New York; St. Louis; Kansas City; Buffalo, etc.; the railroad station and Board of Trade in Chicago; the Washington Monument and federal office buildings in the Capital; the Pennsylvania Railroad Station and the Masonic Temple in Philadelphia; as well as private mansions, monuments, bridges, dams, and thousands of tons of paving blocks for the streets of Portland; Boston; New York; Newark; Philadelphia; and other cities. The Vinalhaven quarries were the only ones deep enough to provide the eight huge polished columns called for in the original plans for the apse of the Cathedral of Saint John the Divine in New York City; the massive columns broke under their own weight, and ultimately more than one piece of granite had to be put together to create each column. The quarries also provided foundation stone for the cathedral. One of the 22 eagle statues from the original Penn Station can be found in the center of town because much of the granite used in the project came from Vinalhaven.

A noted lobster fishing community, Vinalhaven has fishing rights to much of Penobscot Bay and its offshore waters. There are ten major fishing grounds around Vinalhaven that the island's fishermen and some Matinicus Isle fishermen have used for centuries to capture such groundfish as cod, haddock, pollock, hake, lobster, scallops and halibut. Shrimp, dogfish, mackerel and herring are also abundant in the waters around Vinalhaven. Vinalhaven lobstermen were the first in the nation to unionize. They began to organize in the winter of 2012–13 after frustration with low lobster prices and disagreements with the Maine Lobstermen's Associations leadership.

The 2006 movie Islander was filmed in part on Vinalhaven; some locals acted in the movie.

Vinalhaven made news in March 2020 during the COVID-19 pandemic after a group of island residents cut down a tree and dragged it into the road in an attempt to forcibly quarantine three roommates with out-of-state license plates they believed could have the virus. As it turned out, the incident was between two groups of workers. One side was Vinalhaven people, the other a crew from New Jersey. The two groups had earlier clashed at a local bar.

Vinalhaven was the scene of a fatal stabbing in the summer of 2020.

== Geography ==
According to the United States Census Bureau, the town has an area of 168.69 square miles (436.91 km^{2}), of which 23.46 square miles (60.76 km^{2}) is land and 145.23 square miles (376.14 km^{2}) is water.

== Demographics ==
Historical population
Census	Pop.	Note	%±
1790	578		—
1800	858		48.4%
1810	1,052		22.6%
1820	1,308		24.3%
1830	1,794		37.2%
1840	1,950		8.7%
1850	1,252		−35.8%
1860	1,667		33.1%
1870	1,851		11.0%
1880	2,855		54.2%
1890	2,617		−8.3%
1900	2,358		−9.9%
1910	2,344		−0.6%
1920	1,965		−16.2%
1930	1,843		−6.2%
1940	1,629		−11.6%
1950	1,427		−12.4%
1960	1,273		−10.8%
1970	1,135		−10.8%
1980	1,211		6.7%
1990	1,072		−11.5%
2000	1,235		15.2%
2010	1,165		−5.7%
2020	1,279		9.8%
U.S. Decennial Census

=== 2010 census ===
As of the census of 2010, there were 1,165 people, 545 households, and 320 families residing in the town. The population density was 49.7 inhabitants per square mile (19.2/km^{2}). There were 1,295 housing units at an average density of 55.2 per square mile (21.3/km^{2}). The racial makeup of the town was 97.6% White, 0.1% African American, 0.3% Native American, 0.3% Asian, 0.2% from other races, and 1.6% from two or more races. Hispanic or Latino of any race were 0.2% of the population.

There were 545 households, of which 24.2% had children under the age of 18 living with them, 46.2% were married couples living together, 7.5% had a female householder with no husband present, 5.0% had a male householder with no wife present, and 41.3% were non-families. Of all households, 34.5% were made up of individuals, and 13.4% had someone living alone who was 65 years of age or older. The average household size was 2.14 and the average family size was 2.70.

The median age in the town was 45.1 years. 19.5% of residents were under the age of 18; 7% were between the ages of 18 and 24; 23.4% were from 25 to 44; 33.6% were from 45 to 64; and 16.7% were 65 years of age or older. The gender makeup of the town was 51.2% male and 48.8% female.

=== 2000 census ===
As of the census of 2000, there were 1,235 people, 550 households, and 341 families residing in the town. The population density was 48.8 inhabitants per square mile (18.8/km^{2}). There were 1,228 housing units at an average density of 48.5 per square mile (18.7/km^{2}). The racial makeup of the town was 98.14% White, 0.32% Native American, 0.32% Asian, and 1.21% from two or more races.

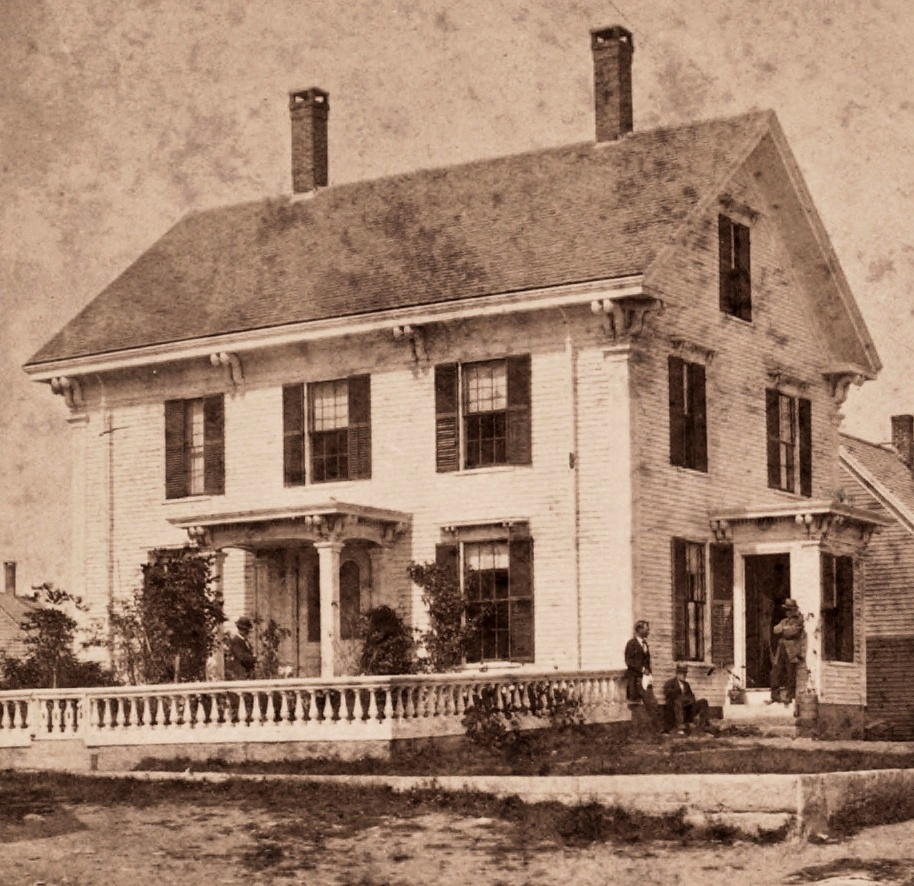
A residence c. 1880

There were 550 households, out of which 29.3% had children under the age of 18 living with them, 49.6% were married couples living together, 7.5% had a female householder with no husband present, and 38.0% were non-families. Of all households, 32.5% were made up of individuals, and 15.3% had someone living alone who was 65 years of age or older. The average household size was 2.25 and the average family size was 2.82. Lobstering is a considerable part of the island's economy.

In the town, the population was spread out, with 23.7% under 18; 6.4% from 18 to 24; 27.8% from 25 to 44; 23.6% from 45 to 64; and 18.5% 65 or older. The median age was 40. For every 100 females, there were 92.1 males. For every 100 females 18 and over, there were 91.1 males.

The median income for a household in the town was $34,087, and the median income for a family was $42,917. Males had a median income of $36,094 versus $17,750 for females. The per capita income was $21,287. About 5.7% of families and 9.0% of the population were below the poverty line, including 7.1% of those under 18 and 8.6% of those 65 or over.

== Energy ==
Vinalhaven is the site of one of the first large wind power projects on the U.S. east coast. Approved by a vote of 383–5 on July 29, 2008, by members of the Fox Islands Electric Cooperative, the project was expected to reduce electrical costs for the island residents, who were importing power from the mainland via a submarine power cable. Three 1.5MW wind turbine towers went online in late 2009; they generate roughly as much power as the island uses.

Near the end of 2009, an Island Energy Task Force was established to "facilitate a transition to affordable, reliable, domestically produced energy, and on the consumer end, to energy-smart products, with special emphasis on serving the Vinalhaven community." Within months, the task force was spearheading a project to charge thermal storage heaters on the island when the turbines generate more power than the islands need, which is common in the winter.

The turbines have reduced power bills but disturb nearby residents with constant noise and vibration.

== Education ==
- Vinalhaven School is the town's K–12 public school.

== Sites of interest ==
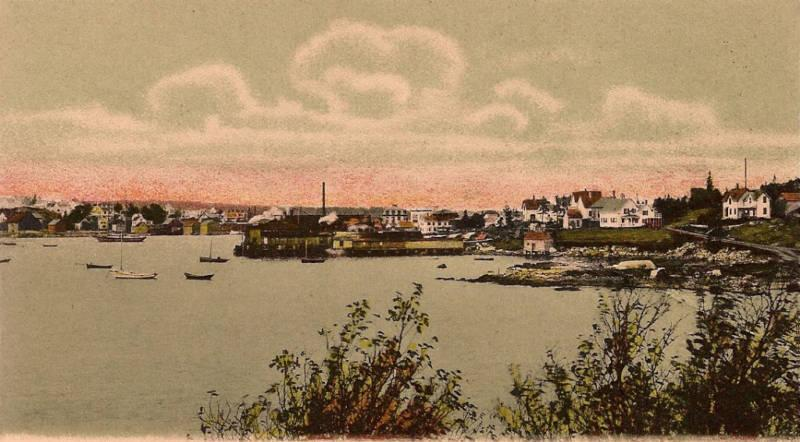
Vinalhaven from Lane's Island in 1905

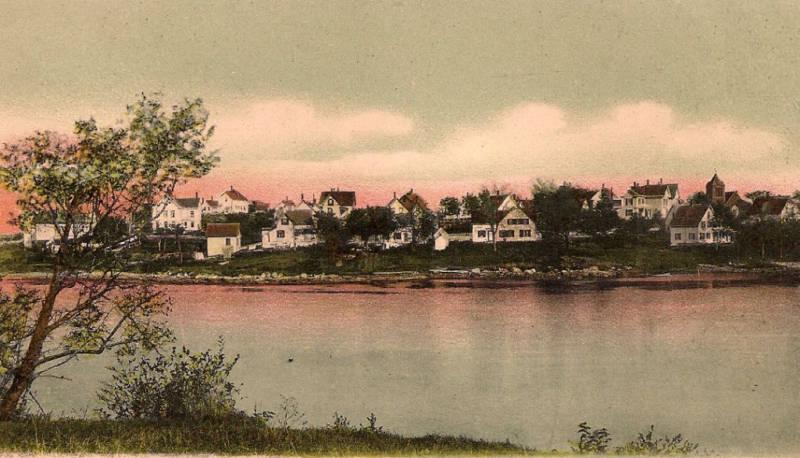
East side in 1905

- Browns Head Light
- Heron Neck Light
- Lane's Island
- Saddleback Ledge Light
- Vinalhaven Historical Society & Museum

Properties in Vinalhaven listed on the National Register of Historic Places include Browns Head Light, Heron Neck Light, Murch Family House, Pleasant River Grange No. 492, Saddleback Ledge Light, Star of Hope Lodge, Union Church of Vinalhaven, Vinalhaven Public Library and the Moses Webster House.

== Notable people ==
- Margaret Wise Brown, children's book author
- Caitlin Cahow, hockey player
- Joseph P. Dyer, politician
- Gerald Edelman, scientist (Nobel Prize, 1972)
- John C. Harkness, architect
- Leonard Hokanson, concert pianist
- Robert Indiana, artist associated with the Pop Art movement
- John Jay Iselin, administrator, educator
- Philip Jamison, artist
- Brewster Jennings, industrialist
- Owen P. Lyons, politician
- Bill Murray, professional baseball player
- Leverett Saltonstall, 55th governor of Massachusetts
- Ketch Secor, musician with the Old Crow Medicine Show
- John Wulp, scenic designer, producer, director

== See also ==
- List of islands of Maine
- List of islands of the United States by area
- North Haven, Maine
