= North Haven, Maine =

Town in Maine, United States

- Town
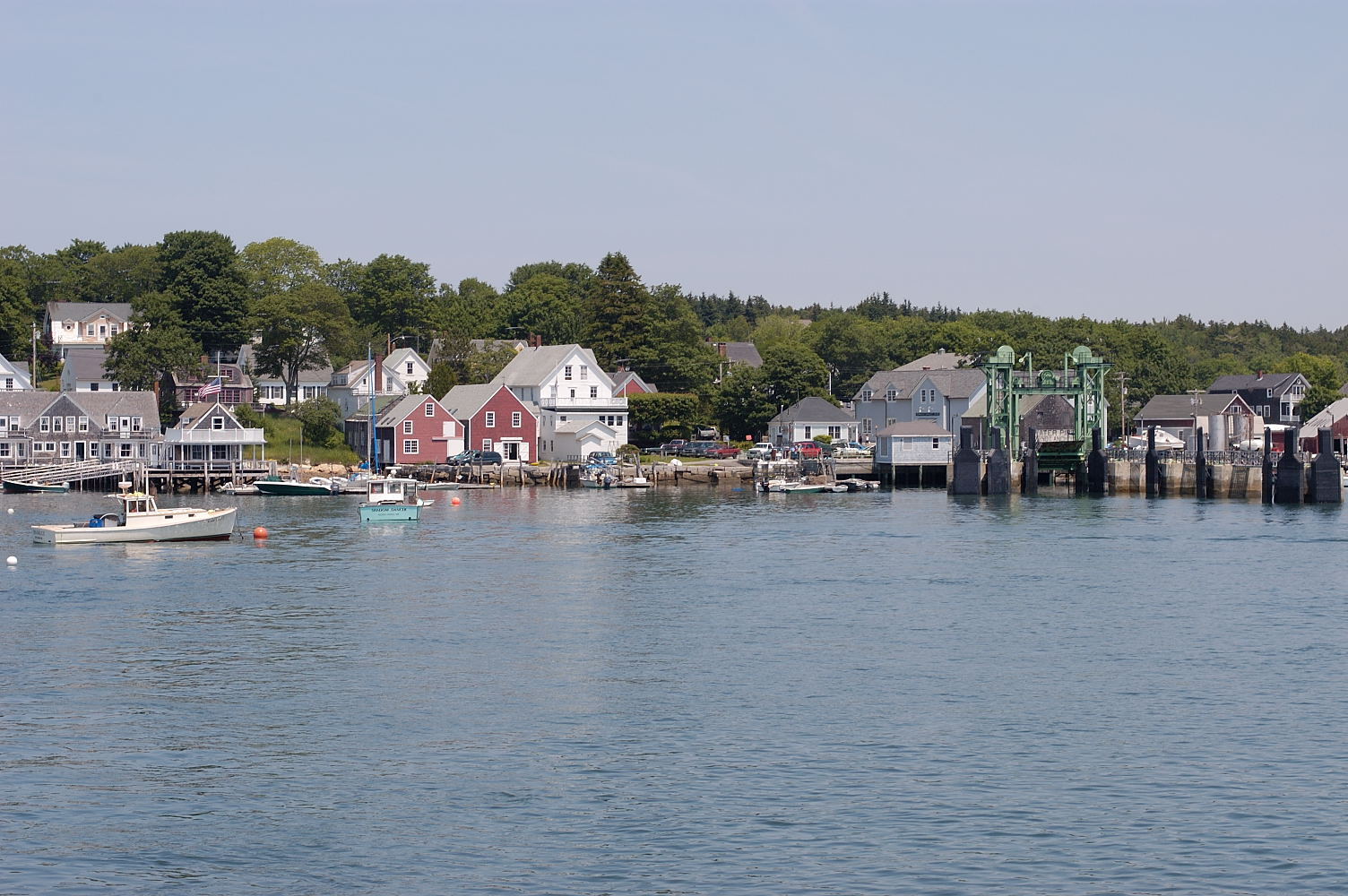
- Harborfront and ferry terminal, 2005

- Seal

- Location in Knox County and the state of Maine
- Coordinates: 44°07′41″N 68°44′27″W
- Country: United States
- State: Maine
- County: Knox
- Incorporated: June 30, 1846

Area
  - Total: 82.49 sq mi (213.65 km^{2})
  - Land: 11.62 sq mi (30.10 km^{2})
  - Water: 70.87 sq mi (183.55 km^{2})
- Elevation: 0 ft (0 m)

Population (2020)
  - Total: 417
  - Density: 36/sq mi (13.9/km^{2})
- Time zone: UTC−5 (Eastern (EST))
  - Summer (DST): UTC−4 (EDT)
- ZIP Code: 04853
- Area code: 207
- FIPS code: 23-51620
- GNIS feature ID: 582633
- Website: www.northhavenmaine.org

North Haven is a town and island in Knox County, Maine, United States, in Penobscot Bay. The town is both a year-round island community and a prominent summer colony. The population was 417 at the 2020 census. North Haven is accessible by thrice-daily state ferry service from Rockland, or by air taxi from Knox County Regional Airport.

== History ==
=== European arrival ===
English explorer Martin Pring from Bristol, England, explored the area in 1603 at age 23, commanding the ships Speedwell and Explorer in an expedition to assess the commercial potential of the northern Virginia territory. Pring named the islands "Fox Islands" after the indigenous silver-gray foxes he observed, a name that survives in the Fox Islands Thoroughfare, the strait separating North Haven and Vinalhaven that provides passage for boats crossing Penobscot Bay.

=== Town incorporation and early governance ===
North Haven was originally the North Island of Vinalhaven, from which it was set off and incorporated on March 1, 1847, as the town of Fox Isle, with the name changed to North Haven on July 13 of the same year. In 1850, the state legislature passed an act that gave the majority of island inhabitants "the right to have such roads as they deemed fit." The majority thereupon decided to have no roads at all, or else roads obstructed with gates or bars at the discretion of landowners. Some residents petitioned to amend the act.

=== Economic development ===
Historically, North Haven was known as the farming island because of its flat and fertile ground, with hay being a staple crop for many years. In terms of trade, the island supplied Boston and other New England cities with produce and lamb via steamships. Fishing and farming became chief occupations. Boatbuilding became a prominent industry and to this day, there are two active boatyards on the island. But many inhabitants were fishermen who caught lobsters, scallops and oysters.

=== Summer colony ===
In the 1880s, summer "rusticators" discovered the island, arriving first from Boston and a decade later from New York and Philadelphia, building cottages on both sides of the Thoroughfare that separates North Haven and Vinalhaven and later establishing another summer colony at Pulpit Harbor. North Haven is best known today for its sizable summer colony of prominent north-easterners, particularly Boston Brahmins, drawn to the island for over a century to savor its simple way of life. Among the more notable summer residents was the impressionist painter Frank Weston Benson, who rented the Wooster Farm as a summer home and painted several notable canvases set on the island.

The southern side of the Fox Islands Thoroughfare is often informally considered part of North Haven, since Vinalhaven's north shore is nearly a dozen miles from that community's town center. In contrast to Vinalhaven, North Haven's economy relies less on the lobster industry and more on sustaining its summer resort community. Energy for the community is partially provided by the wind project in Vinalhaven through the Fox Island Electric Cooperative.

A small population of Mouflon sheep (native to Europe and western Asia) escaped from an animal enclosure owned by Thomas Watson, Jr. on the island in the 1990s and some of the original population survives today.

== North Haven Dinghy ==
In 1885, William Weld challenged the yachtsmen of North Haven to a race. He used the tender from his yacht Gitana and unsuccessfully raced against a variety of sprit-sailed boats. That winter he went home and had a better dinghy designed and built in Salem, Massachusetts. The next year he beat all contenders. The boat was hauled out at North Haven, and two copies were made by Henry Calderwood. The subsequent race was between Mrs. Cobb, Miss Spencer and Miss Hayward. The first boats had spritsails, but this soon gave way to gaff rigs. In 1888, James Osman Brown built four more dinghies. This was at the beginning of J. O. Brown & Sons boatyard. The racing fleet grew over the years. They are still raced out of North Haven's sailing club, the North Haven Casino, a private sailing club, making them the oldest continuously raced class in the United States.

== Geography ==
According to the United States Census Bureau, the town has an area of 82.49 square miles (213.65 km^{2}), of which 11.62 square miles (30.10 km^{2}) is land and 70.87 square miles (183.55 km^{2}) is water. At its widest points, the island is roughly 7.9 miles (12.7 km) long and 2.9 miles (4.7 km) wide. It is in Penobscot Bay and the Gulf of Maine, part of the Atlantic Ocean.

== Demographics ==
Historical population
| Census | Pop. | Note | %± |
|---|---|---|---|
| 1850 | 806 | | — |
| 1860 | 951 | | 18.0% |
| 1870 | 806 | | −15.2% |
| 1880 | 755 | | −6.3% |
| 1890 | 552 | | −26.9% |
| 1900 | 551 | | −0.2% |
| 1910 | 535 | | −2.9% |
| 1920 | 510 | | −4.7% |
| 1930 | 476 | | −6.7% |
| 1940 | 460 | | −3.4% |
| 1950 | 410 | | −10.9% |
| 1960 | 384 | | −6.3% |
| 1970 | 399 | | 3.9% |
| 1980 | 373 | | −6.5% |
| 1990 | 332 | | −11.0% |
| 2000 | 381 | | 14.8% |
| 2010 | 355 | | −6.8% |
| 2020 | 417 | | 17.5% |
U.S. Decennial Census

=== 2000 census ===
As of the census of 2000, there were 381 people, 162 households, and 109 families residing in the town. The population density was 32.7 inhabitants per square mile (12.6/km^{2}). There were 488 housing units at an average density of 41.9 per square mile (16.2/km^{2}). The racial makeup of the town was 95.28% White, 1.05% African American, 3.15% from other races, and 0.52% from two or more races. Hispanic or Latino of any race were 2.36% of the population.

There were 162 households, of which 29.0% had children under 18 living with them, 57.4% were married couples living together, 4.3% had a female householder with no husband present, and 32.7% were non-families. 27.8% of all households were made up of individuals, and 10.5% had someone living alone who was 65 or older. The average household size was 2.35 and the average family size was 2.86.

In the town, the population was spread out, with 25.2% under 18, 5.2% from 18 to 24, 30.2% from 25 to 44, 27.0% from 45 to 64, and 12.3% who were 65 or older. The median age was 39. For every 100 females, there were 103.7 males. For every 100 females 18 and over, there were 112.7 males.

The median income for a household in the town was $40,446, and the median income for a family was $42,361. Males had a median income of $31,071 versus $16,000 for females. The per capita income was $17,112. About 4.4% of families and 7.2% of the population were below the poverty line, including 2.8% of those under 18 and 6.3% of those 65 or over.

=== 2010 census ===
As of the census of 2010, there were 355 people, 165 households, and 105 families residing in the town. The population density was 30.6 inhabitants per square mile (11.8/km^{2}). There were 515 housing units at an average density of 44.3 per square mile (17.1/km^{2}). The racial makeup of the town was 96.9% White, 0.3% African American, 0.3% Asian, 0.6% from other races, and 2.0% from two or more races. Hispanic or Latino of any race were 2.3% of the population.

There were 165 households, of which 23.0% had children under 18 living with them, 49.1% were married couples living together, 11.5% had a female householder with no husband present, 3.0% had a male householder with no wife present, and 36.4% were non-families. 29.7% of all households were made up of individuals, and 9.6% had someone living alone who was 65 or older. The average household size was 2.15 and the average family size was 2.62.

The median age in the town was 44.5. 20% of residents were under 18; 5.6% were between 18 and 24; 25.9% were from 25 to 44; 29.1% were from 45 to 64; and 19.4% were 65 or older. The gender makeup of the town was 52.4% male and 47.6% female.

== Education ==
North Haven is unusual among Maine island communities in offering a K–12 school; most islands have only elementary schools and send their high school students to schools on the mainland (Vinalhaven, Mount Desert Island, Deer isle and Islesboro are the only other islands to offer K–12 education). North Haven Community School is one of Maine's smallest public schools. Its motto is "Competence, Compassion, Challenge and Community." Notable alumni include Hannah Pingree, who served as Maine's Speaker of the House of Representatives for two terms.

== Notable people ==
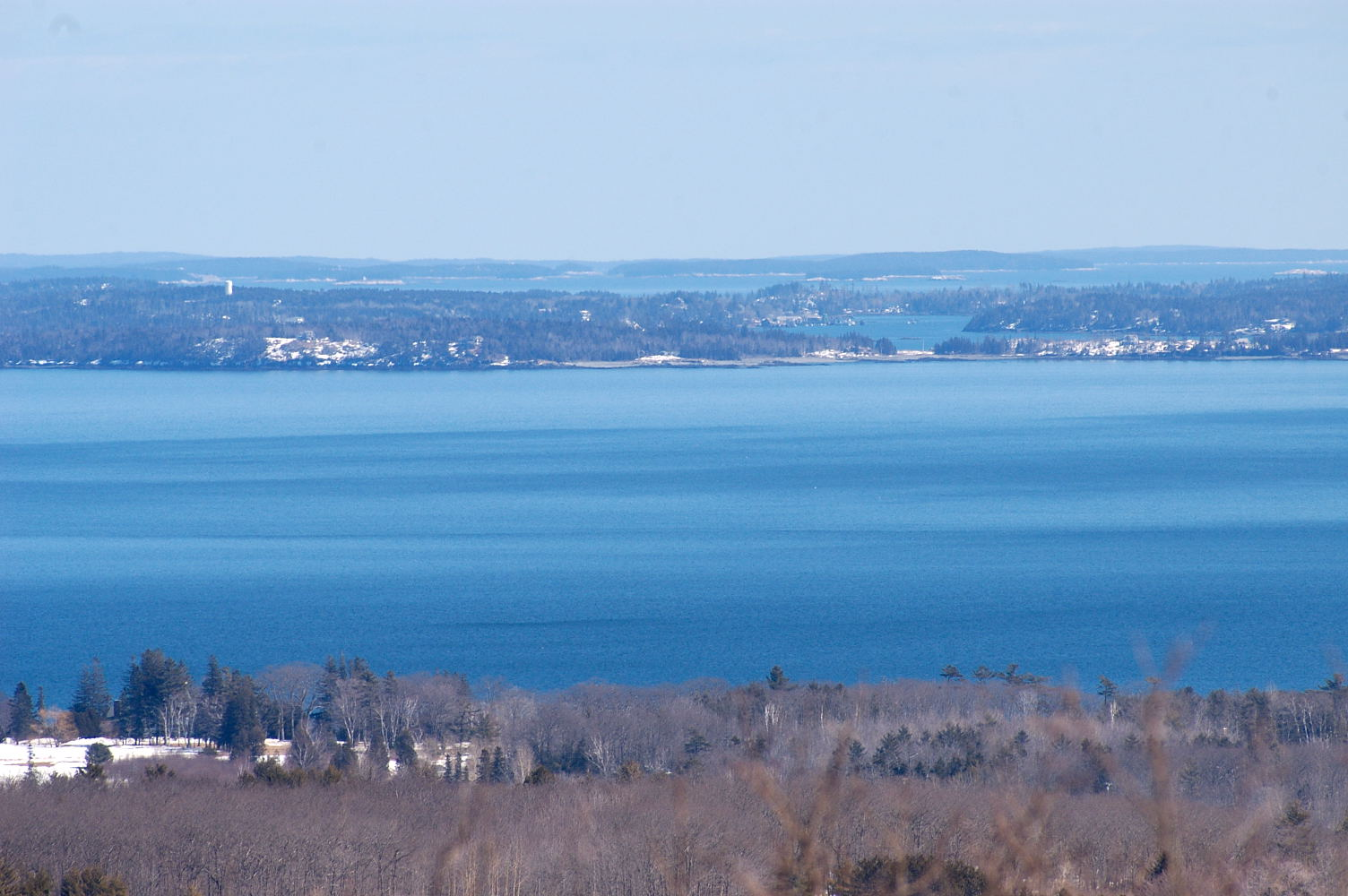
North Haven and the Fox Islands Thoroughfare viewed from Rockland

- Angela Adams, designer
- Frank Weston Benson, artist with summer home on North Haven
- Harold Beverage, electrical engineer and inventor
- Elizabeth Bishop, poet
- Jonathan Bush, banker
- Henry N. Cobb, architect
- Pierre S. du Pont IV, politician
- J. Christopher Flowers, banker
- Eric Hopkins, painter
- Ned Lamont, Governor of Connecticut since 2019
- Charles Lindbergh, aviator and author
- Anne Morrow Lindbergh, aviator and author
- Burke Marshall, lawyer, professor
- Susan Minot, writer
- Robert Montgomery, actor and father of Elizabeth Montgomery
- Dwight Morrow, ambassador
- Chellie Pingree, U.S. representative, Maine Senate majority leader
- Hannah Pingree, former speaker of the Maine House of Representatives
- Nicholas Platt, US ambassador
- Oliver Platt, actor
- Matthew Simmons, investment banker
- John Sirica, U.S. District Court Judge, Watergate figure
- Herbert Eustis Winlock, Egyptologist
- Wilford Woodruff, 4th president of the LDS Church, spent August 1837 to May 1838 on North Haven.

== See also ==
- List of islands of Maine
- Vinalhaven, Maine
