= Snow Mountain (Oxford County, Maine) =

Mountain in Oxford County, Maine, United States

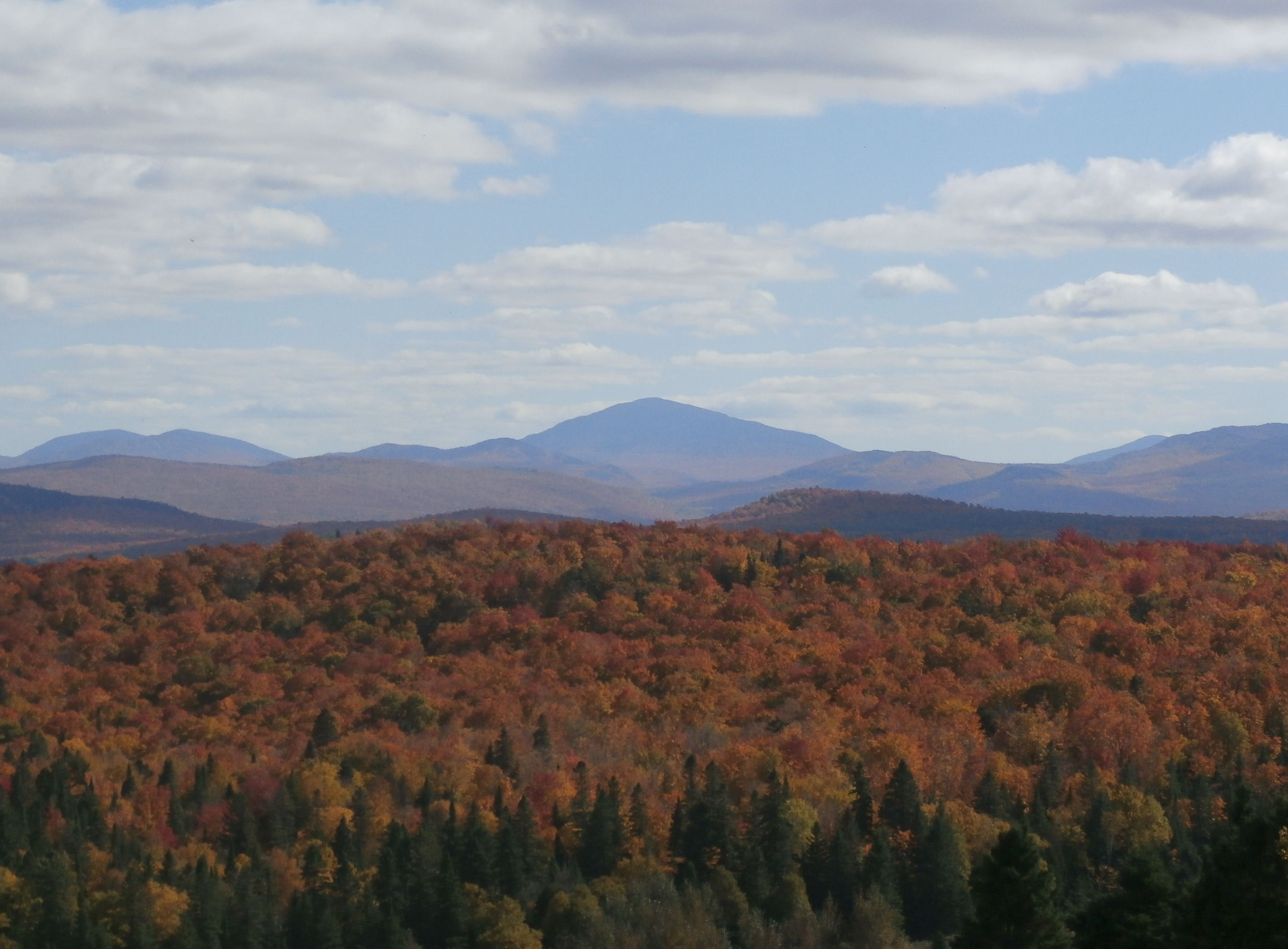
- Snow Mountain, seen from Piopolis

Highest point
- Elevation: 3,783 ft (1,153 m)
- Prominence: 1,280 ft (390 m)
- Listing: New England 100 Highest #94
- Coordinates: 45°10′09″N 70°49′36″W

Geography
- Location within Maine
- Location: Oxford County, Maine, U.S.
- Topo map: USGS Little Kennebago Lake

Climbing
- Easiest route: trailless bushwack

Snow Mountain is a mountain located in Oxford County, Maine, about 4 mi (6.4 km) south of the Canada–United States border with Québec. The mountain is sometimes called "Cupsuptic Snow", to distinguish it from another "Snow Mountain" about 10 mi (16 km) to the northeast. Snow Mountain is flanked to the north by Kennebago Divide Mountain, and to the south by Twin Mountains and West Kennebago Mountain.

Snow Mountain stands within the watershed of the upper Androscoggin River, which drains into Merrymeeting Bay, the estuary of the Kennebec River, and then into the Gulf of Maine. The west end of Snow Mtn. drains into Snow Mountain Brook, then into the Cupsuptic River, Cupsuptic Lake, through a series of lakes into the Rapid River and Umbagog Lake, the source of the Androscoggin River. The south side of Snow Mtn. drains into the East Branch of the Cupsuptic River. The northeast and northwest sides of Snow Mtn. drain into Wiggle Brook, then into the Kennebago River and Cupsuptic Lake.

== See also ==
- Snow Mountain
- List of mountains in Maine
- New England Hundred Highest
