= North Brother =

Mountain in Maine, United States

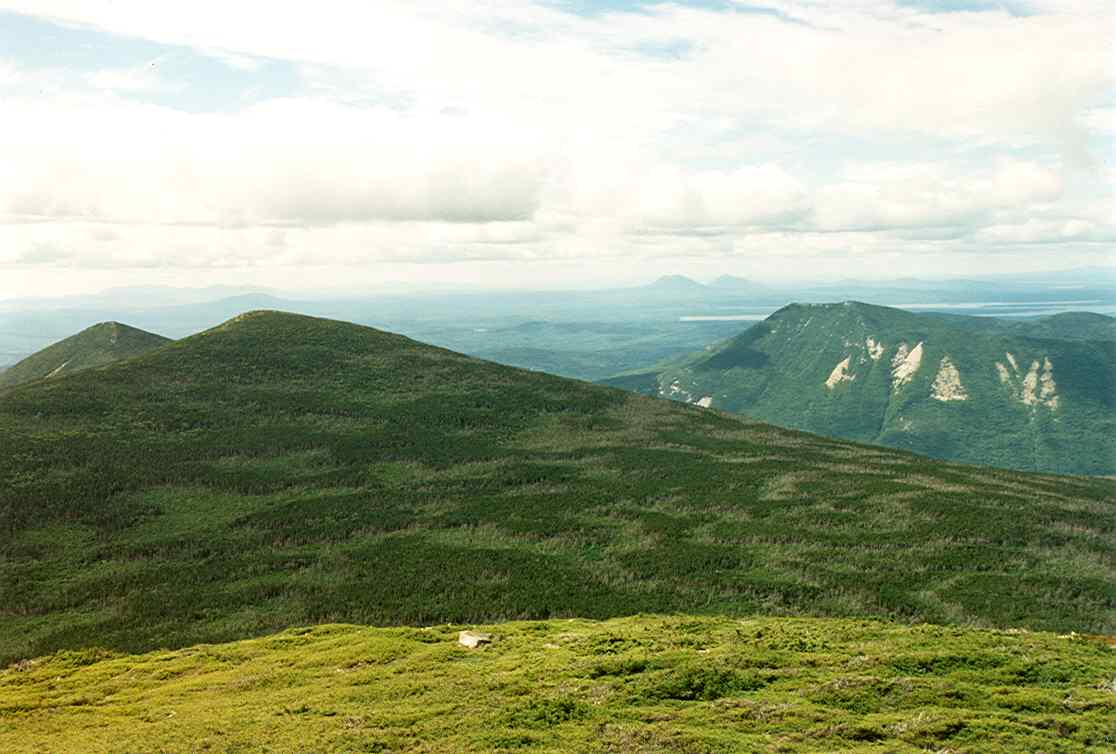
- South Brother (left) and Mount Coe (far left)& Doubletop Mountain (Maine) seen from North Brother

Highest point
- Elevation: 4,150 ft (1,260 m)
- Prominence: 1,243 ft (379 m)
- Listing: New England 4000 footers
- Coordinates: 45°57′26″N 68°59′07″W

Geography
- Location within Maine
- Location: Piscataquis County, Maine, U.S.
- Topo map: USGS Mount Katahdin

Climbing
- Easiest route: Hiking trail

North Brother is a mountain located in Baxter State Park, Piscataquis County, Maine. North Brother is flanked to the northeast by Fort Mountain, and to the southwest by South Brother; collectively the two are called "The Brothers."

The south and east sides of North Brother drains into a swampy area called "The Klondike", then into Wassataquoik Stream, the East Branch of the Penobscot River, and into Penobscot Bay. The north and west sides of North Brother drain into Little Nesowadnehunk Stream, Nesowadnehunk Stream, and the West Branch of the Penobscot River.

The Appalachian Trail, a 2,170 mi (3,490 km) National Scenic Trail from Georgia to Maine, reaches its northern terminus, on the summit of Mount Katahdin, 5 miles (8.0 km) to the southeast of The Brothers.

== Climate ==
Climate data for North Brother 45.9611 N, 68.9846 W, Elevation: 3,812 ft (1,162 m) (1991–2020 normals)
| Month | Jan | Feb | Mar | Apr | May | Jun | Jul | Aug | Sep | Oct | Nov | Dec | Year |
|---|---|---|---|---|---|---|---|---|---|---|---|---|---|
| Mean daily maximum °F (°C) | 14.6 (−9.7) | 16.4 (−8.7) | 25.2 (−3.8) | 40.3 (4.6) | 54.1 (12.3) | 63.2 (17.3) | 68.1 (20.1) | 67.5 (19.7) | 60.6 (15.9) | 47.1 (8.4) | 31.4 (−0.3) | 20.7 (−6.3) | 42.4 (5.8) |
| Daily mean °F (°C) | 6.7 (−14.1) | 8.3 (−13.2) | 17.4 (−8.1) | 31.1 (−0.5) | 44.9 (7.2) | 54.3 (12.4) | 59.0 (15.0) | 58.0 (14.4) | 50.8 (10.4) | 37.8 (3.2) | 25.2 (−3.8) | 12.5 (−10.8) | 33.8 (1.0) |
| Mean daily minimum °F (°C) | −1.2 (−18.4) | 0.3 (−17.6) | 9.7 (−12.4) | 21.9 (−5.6) | 35.8 (2.1) | 45.3 (7.4) | 50.0 (10.0) | 48.5 (9.2) | 40.9 (4.9) | 28.4 (−2.0) | 19.1 (−7.2) | 4.3 (−15.4) | 25.3 (−3.7) |
| Average precipitation inches (mm) | 4.58 (116) | 3.74 (95) | 4.57 (116) | 5.45 (138) | 5.57 (141) | 6.77 (172) | 6.51 (165) | 5.56 (141) | 5.33 (135) | 6.91 (176) | 5.63 (143) | 6.11 (155) | 66.73 (1,693) |
Source: PRISM Climate Group

== See also ==
- List of mountains in Maine
