= White Cap Mountain (Franklin County, Maine) =

Mountain in Maine, United States

- Location within Maine

Highest point
- Elevation: 3,856 ft (1,175 m)
- Prominence: 996 ft (304 m)
- Listing: New England 100 Highest #82
- Coordinates: 45°14′10″N 70°49′05″W

Geography
- Location: Franklin County, Maine
- Topo map: USGS Little Kennebago Lake

Climbing
- Easiest route: trailless bushwhack

White Cap Mountain is a mountain located in Franklin County, Maine, about 1 mi (1.6 km) east of the Canada–US border with Québec. White Cap Mountain is flanked to the south by Kennebago Divide Mountain.

White Cap Mountain stands within the watershed of the upper Androscoggin River, which drains into Merrymeeting Bay, the estuary of the Kennebec River, and then into the Gulf of Maine. The north face of White Cap Mountain drains via a stream into the Kennebago River, then into Cupsuptic Lake, through a series of lakes into the Rapid River and Umbagog Lake, the source of the Androscoggin River. The southeast end of White Cap drains into Bear Brook, and then into the Kennebago River. The southwest side of White Cap drains into Porter Brook, then into the Cupsuptic River and Cupsuptic Lake.

== See also ==
- List of mountains in Maine
- New England Hundred Highest
