= Kennebago Divide =

Mountain in United States of America

- Location within Maine Location within the United States

Highest point
- Elevation: 3,775 ft (1,151 m)
- Prominence: 360 ft (110 m)
- Listing: New England 100 Highest #96
- Coordinates: 45°13′22″N 70°48′57″W

Geography
- Location: Franklin / Oxford counties, Maine, U.S.
- Topo map: USGS Little Kennebago Lake

Climbing
- Easiest route: trailless bushwhack

Kennebago Divide is a mountain located in Maine's Franklin and Oxford counties. It is also known as North Peak of Kennebago Divide. Its highest peak is in Franklin County, about 1.5 miles (2.4 km) southeast of the Canada–United States border with Québec. Kennebago Divide is flanked to the northeast by White Cap Mountain, and to the south by Snow Mountain.

Kennebago Divide stands within the watershed of the upper Androscoggin River, which drains into Merrymeeting Bay, the estuary of the Kennebec River, and then into the Gulf of Maine. The southeast side of Kennebago Divide drains into Bear Brook, and thence into the Kennebago River, then into Cupsuptic Lake, through a series of lakes into the Rapid River and Umbagog Lake, the source of the Androscoggin River. The south end of Kennebago Divide drains into Wiggle Brook, then into the Kennebago River. The northwest side of Kennebago Divide drains into Porter Brook and the Cupsuptic River, then into Cupsuptic Lake.

== See also ==
- List of mountains in Maine
