= List of mountains of Maine =

This is a list of mountains in the state of Maine.

Peaks in the state of Maine
Mountain Peak	Elevation	Prominence	Isolation	Location	County
Mount Abraham	4,049 ft 1234 m	899 ft 274 m	4.11 mi 6.62 km	44°58′23″N 70°19′35″W	Franklin
Agamenticus	692 ft 211 m	522 ft 159 m	12.05 mi 19.4 km	43°13′24″N 70°41′31″W	York
Baker Mountain	3,520 ft 1073 m	2,198 ft 670 m	7.25 mi 11.66 km	45°34′16″N 69°23′38″W	Piscataquis
Bald Mountain	2,460 ft 750 m	940 ft 287 m	2.09 mi 3.37 km	44°56′38″N 70°46′32″W	Franklin
Bald Mountain	1,261 ft 384 m	1,033 ft 315 m	10.53 mi 16.94 km	44°39′30″N 68°36′17″W	Hancock
Baldpate Mountain	3,786 ft 1154 m	2,221 ft 677 m	4.02 mi 6.47 km	44°36′33″N 70°53′42″W	Oxford
Bauneg Beg Mountain	860 ft 262 m	420 ft 128 m	11.82 mi 19.03 km	43°23′03″N 70°47′06″W	York
Bigelow Mountain, Avery Peak	4,091 ft 1247 m	308 ft 94 m	0.63 mi 1.01 km	45°08′48″N 70°16′31″W	Somerset
Mount Bigelow, South Horn	3,806 ft 1160 m	427 ft 130 m	1.71 mi 2.76 km	45°08′42″N 70°19′23″W	Franklin
Bigelow Mountain, West Peak	4,144 ft 1263 m	2,844 ft 867 m	8.03 mi 12.93 km	45°09′00″N 70°17′00″W	Somerset
Big Moose Mountain	3,196 ft 974 m	2,133 ft 650 m	15.25 mi 24.6 km	45°29′03″N 69°42′42″W	Piscataquis
Big Spencer Mountain	3,205 ft 977 m	1,919 ft 585 m	12.54 mi 20.2 km	45°46′22″N 69°26′50″W	Piscataquis
Black Cap Mountain	1,020 ft 311 m	571 ft 174 m	6.84 mi 11.01 km	44°45′13″N 68°33′58″W	Penobscot
Black Nubble	3,707 ft 1130 m	899 ft 274 m	2.9 mi 4.66 km	45°01′56″N 70°26′50″W	Franklin
Mount Blue	3,192 ft 973 m	1,841 ft 561 m	9.08 mi 14.61 km	44°43′41″N 70°20′31″W	Franklin
Blueberry Mountain	1,781 ft 543 m	92 ft 28 m	2.11 mi 3.4 km	44°15′57″N 70°58′43″W	Oxford
Borestone Mountain	1,946 ft 593 m	971 ft 296 m	3.11 mi 5 km	45°22′37″N 69°24′14″W	Piscataquis
Boundary Bald Mountain	3,638 ft 1109 m	2,011 ft 613 m	20.9 mi 33.7 km	45°46′01″N 70°12′14″W	Somerset
Boundary Peak	3,855 ft 1175 m	495 ft 151 m	1.12 mi 1.81 km	45°16′02″N 70°50′28″W	Oxford
Cadillac Mountain	1,529 ft 466 m	1,529 ft 466 m	87 mi 140.1 km	44°21′05″N 68°13′35″W	Hancock
Catherine Mountain	961 ft 293 m	412 ft 126 m	1.19 mi 1.92 km	44°36′59″N 68°05′09″W	Hancock
Coburn Mountain	3,717 ft 1133 m	2,510 ft 765 m	23.4 mi 37.7 km	45°28′08″N 70°07′36″W	Somerset
Mount Coe	3,796 ft 1157 m	315 ft 96 m	0.8 mi 1.29 km	45°56′01″N 69°00′32″W	Piscataquis
Crocker Mountain	4,229 ft 1289 m	1,214 ft 370 m	3.57 mi 5.74 km	45°02′50″N 70°22′58″W	Franklin
Caribou Mountain	3,648 ft 1112 m	1,240 ft 378 m	3.9 mi 6.28 km	45°26′22″N 70°36′41″W	Franklin
Doubletop Mountain	3,488 ft 1063 m	2,070 ft 631 m	2.51 mi 4.04 km	45°56′09″N 69°03′40″W	Piscataquis
East Kennebago Mountain	3,789 ft 1155 m	1,804 ft 550 m	11.79 mi 18.98 km	45°07′19″N 70°35′59″W	Franklin
Elephant Mountain	3,773 ft 1150 m	2,060 ft 628 m	12.25 mi 19.71 km	44°46′05″N 70°46′54″W	Oxford
Elephant Mountain	2,595 ft 791 m	984 ft 300 m	2.82 mi 4.54 km	45°30′56″N 69°25′32″W	Piscataquis
Fort Mountain	3,862 ft 1177 m	200 ft 61 m	0.62 mi 0.99 km	45°57′44″N 68°58′29″W	Piscataquis
Goose Eye Mountain	3,871 ft 1180 m	1,378 ft 420 m	5.23 mi 8.41 km	44°30′09″N 70°59′29″W	Oxford
Great Pond Mountain	1,030 ft 314 m	781 ft 238 m	4.99 mi 8.03 km	44°36′01″N 68°39′55″W	Hancock
Mount Jefferson	755 ft 230 m	168 ft 51 m	0.68 mi 1.09 km	45°21′08″N 68°16′58″W	Penobscot
Mount Katahdin, Baxter Peak	5,269 ft 1606 m	4,288 ft 1307 m	158.3 mi 255 km	45°54′16″N 68°55′17″W	Piscataquis
Mount Katahdin, Hamlin Peak	4,757 ft 1450 m	499 ft 152 m	1.4 mi 2.26 km	45°55′16″N 68°55′24″W	Piscataquis
Kennebago Divide	3,776 ft 1151 m	361 ft 110 m	0.94 mi 1.52 km	45°13′22″N 70°48′57″W	Franklin/Oxford
Kibby Mountain	3,655 ft 1114 m	2,264 ft 690 m	11.9 mi 19.15 km	45°25′07″N 70°32′40″W	Franklin
Mount Kineo	1,788 ft 545 m	751 ft 229 m	3.47 mi 5.59 km	45°41′59″N 69°44′02″W	Piscataquis
Lead Mountain	1,480 ft 451 m	1,119 ft 341 m	35.7 mi 57.5 km	44°51′52″N 68°06′37″W	Hancock
Mars Hill	1,749 ft 533 m	1,211 ft 369 m	33.9 mi 54.6 km	46°31′16″N 67°48′49″W	Aroostook
Moxie Mountain	2,936 ft 895 m	1,821 ft 555 m	16.55 mi 26.6 km	45°12′25″N 69°53′38″W	Somerset
North Brother	4,150 ft 1265 m	1,243 ft 379 m	2.54 mi 4.09 km	45°57′26″N 68°59′07″W	Piscataquis
Noyes Mountain	1,503 ft 458 m	755 ft 230 m	1.18 mi 1.9 km	44°17′30″N 70°38′19″W	Oxford
Old Speck Mountain	4,170 ft 1271 m	2,730 ft 832 m	20.7 mi 33.2 km	44°34′16″N 70°57′13″W	Oxford
Puzzle Mountain	3,133 ft 955 m	1,201 ft 366 m	5.35 mi 8.61 km	44°32′26″N 70°16′37″W	Oxford
Mount Redington	4,009 ft 1222 m	459 ft 140 m	0.99 mi 1.6 km	45°01′30″N 70°23′19″W	Franklin
Rollins Mountain	1,001 ft 305 m	669 ft 204 m	13.53 mi 21.8 km	45°23′14″N 68°21′50″W	Penobscot
Saddleback Mountain, the Horn	4,042 ft 1232 m	476 ft 145 m	1.34 mi 2.15 km	44°57′05″N 70°29′14″W	Franklin
Saddleback Junior	3,655 ft 1114 m	623 ft 190 m	1.5 mi 2.41 km	44°57′29″N 70°27′28″W	Franklin
Saddleback Mountain	3,002 ft 915 m	1,854 ft 565 m	3.93 mi 6.32 km	45°30′34″N 69°08′10″W	Piscataquis
Saddleback Mountain	4,121 ft 1256 m	2,448 ft 746 m	9.7 mi 15.61 km	44°56′12″N 70°30′11″W	Franklin
Sandy Bay Mountain	3,117 ft 950 m	1,142 ft 348 m	4.76 mi 7.66 km	45°45′16″N 70°23′38″W	Somerset
Shutdown Mountain, Bulldog Peak	2,251 ft 686 m	801 ft 244 m	0.81 mi 1.3 km	45°25′39″N 70°11′21″W	Somerset
Shutdown Mountain, Shutdown Peak	2,533 ft 772 m	837 ft 255 m	2 mi 3.22 km	45°25′03″N 70°11′58″W	Somerset
Snow Mountain	3,960 ft 1207 m	2,329 ft 710 m	22.9 mi 36.8 km	45°17′29″N 70°42′34″W	Franklin
Snow Mountain	3,783 ft 1153 m	1,280 ft 390 m	4.62 mi 7.44 km	45°10′09″N 70°49′36″W	Oxford
South Brother	3,970 ft 1210 m	571 ft 174 m	1.21 mi 1.94 km	45°56′38″N 69°00′07″W	Piscataquis
Crocker Mountain, South Peak	4,049 ft 1234 m	361 ft 110 m	0.83 mi 1.33 km	45°02′10″N 70°22′33″W	Franklin
Spaulding Mountain	4,009 ft 1222 m	591 ft 180 m	2.11 mi 3.39 km	45°00′11″N 70°20′01″W	Franklin
Speckled Mountain	2,907 ft 886 m	1,486 ft 453 m	2.75 mi 4.42 km	44°17′28″N 70°57′16″W	Oxford
Stetson Mountain	1,083 ft 330 m	476 ft 145 m	9.44 mi 15.2 km	45°31′34″N 67°58′35″W	Washington
Sugarloaf Mountain	4,249 ft 1295 m	3,182 ft 970 m	64.8 mi 104.3 km	45°01′53″N 70°18′47″W	Franklin
Sunday River Whitecap	3,376 ft 1029 m	984 ft 300 m	3.19 mi 5.14 km	44°32′57″N 70°53′48″W	Oxford
Mount Tire'm	1,060 ft 323 m	300 ft 91 m	2.35 mi 3.78 km	44°10′38″N 70°43′29″W	Oxford
Traveler Mountain	3,550 ft 1082 m	2,346 ft 715 m	9.88 mi 15.9 km	46°04′22″N 68°50′41″W	Piscataquis
Tumbledown Mountain	3,054 ft 931 m	1,401 ft 427 m	0.71 mi 1.14 km	44°45′03″N 70°32′50″W	Franklin
Mount Waldo	1,061 ft 324 m	840 ft 256 m	12.34 mi 19.86 km	44°34′50″N 68°53′48″W	Waldo
West Kennebago Mountain	3,704 ft 1129 m	886 ft 270 m	3.43 mi 5.52 km	45°07′13″N 70°48′56″W	Oxford
White Cap Mountain	3,855 ft 1175 m	1,001 ft 305 m	4.09 mi 6.59 km	45°14′10″N 70°49′05″W	Franklin
White Cap Mountain	3,655 ft 1114 m	2,608 ft 795 m	27.5 mi 44.3 km	45°33′17″N 69°14′47″W	Piscataquis
