= Boundary Peak (Maine/Quebec) =

Mountain on the border of Maine and Quebec

- Location within Maine Location within Quebec

Highest point
- Elevation: 3,855 ft (1,175 m)
- Prominence: 495 ft (151 m)
- Listing: New England 100 Highest #83
- Coordinates: 45°16′02″N 70°50′28″W

Geography
- Location: Oxford County, Maine, U.S. / Le Granit Regional County Municipality, Quebec, Canada
- Parent range: Longfellow Mountains
- Topo map: USGS Northwest Pond

This mountain, which has no formal name, is located on the Canada–US border between boundary markers 445 and 446. It is the highest point on the border east of the Rocky Mountains. Specifically it is the highest point for 3,190 miles (5,130 km) of border from the Passamquoddy Bay up to 111 degrees west in Liberty County, Montana at border monument 360 (miles; 580 km) from the Pacific. The southeast half is in Oxford County, Maine; the northwest half is in Le Granit Regional County Municipality, Quebec, Canada.

The south and east sides of the mountain drain via streams into the Kennebago River, then into Cupsuptic Lake, through a series of lakes into the Rapid River and Umbagog Lake, the source of the Androscoggin River, which drains into Merrymeeting Bay, the estuary of the Kennebec River, and then into the Gulf of Maine. The north and west sides of the mountain drain into Ruisseau Clearwater, then into the Rivière Arnold, and the Rivière aux Araignées, into Lac Mégantic, then into the Chaudière River, and Saint Lawrence River, which drains into the Gulf of St. Lawrence.

== See also ==
- List of mountains in Maine
- New England Hundred Highest
