= Sunday River Whitecap =

Mountain in Maine, United States

- Location within Maine

Highest point
- Elevation: 3,337 ft (1,017 m)
- Prominence: 984 ft (300 m)
- Coordinates: 44°32′57″N 70°53′48″W

Geography
- Location: Oxford County, Maine, U.S.
- Parent range: Mahoosuc Range
- Topo map: USGS Old Speck Mountain

Climbing
- Easiest route: Hiking, class 1

Sunday River Whitecap is a 3,335 ft (1,017 m) mountain located in Oxford County, Maine, United States. It is flanked to the west by Slide Mountain, and to the southeast by Stowe Mountain.

Sunday River Whitecap is within the watershed of the Androscoggin River, which drains into Merrymeeting Bay, the estuary of the Kennebec River, and then into the Gulf of Maine. The north, northeast, and southeast sides of Sunday River Whitecap drain into the Bear River, then into the Androscoggin River. The southwest side drains into Miles Brook, then into Sunday River and the Androscoggin.

The Grafton Loop trail, the trail to the peak completed in 2007, is the suggested route to the summit. The peak offers an excellent 360 degree view of the White Mountains, the Mahoosuc Range, Puzzle Mountain, the Androscoggin River Valley, and the Sunday River ski resort.

== See also ==
- List of mountains in Maine
