= Big Spencer Mountain =

Mountain in Maine, United States

- Location within Maine

Highest point
- Elevation: 3,205 ft (977 m)
- Prominence: 1,919 ft (585 m)
- Listing: 45 New England Fifty Finest
- Coordinates: 45°46′22″N 69°26′50″W

Geography
- Location: Piscataquis County, Maine, U.S.
- Topo map: USGS Big Spencer Mountain

Climbing
- Easiest route: Hiking, class 1

Big Spencer Mountain is a mountain located in Piscataquis County, Maine. Big Spencer Mtn. is flanked to the west by Little Spencer Mountain.

The southwest end of Big Spencer Mountain drains into Kidney Brook, then into Lobster Lake, and into the West Branch of the Penobscot River, and into Penobscot Bay. The northeast end of Big Spencer Mountain drains into spring-fed Blood Pond where the pond's outlet, Maxfield Brook, then empties into Lobster Lake. Part of the southeast side of Big Spencer Mountain drains into Bear Brook, then into Ragged Lake, Ragged Stream, Caribou Lake, Chesuncook Lake, Ripogenus Lake, and into the West Branch Penobscot River. The southern part of the southeast side of Big Spencer drains into Lazy Tom Stream, then into the Roach River, and Moosehead Lake, the source of the Kennebec River.

== See also ==
- List of mountains in Maine
- New England Fifty Finest
