= West Kennebago Mountain =

Mountain in Maine, United States

- Location within Maine

Highest point
- Elevation: 3,750 ft (1,140 m)
- Prominence: 880 ft (270 m)
- Coordinates: 45°07′13″N 70°48′56″W

Geography
- Location: Oxford County, Maine, U.S.
- Topo map: USGS Kennebago

Climbing
- Easiest route: There is only one trail, 1.8 miles, steep in places There is now a monstrous Homeland Security radio relay station at the top, with solar panels, visible on Google Earth. If "prominence" means elevation above base, that is about 1700 feet.

West Kennebago Mountain is a mountain located in Oxford County, Maine. West Kennebago is flanked to the north by Twin Mountains (3,536 ft or 1,078 m), and to the southwest by Burnt Mountain (2,938 ft or 896 m).

West Kennebago Mountain stands within the watershed of the upper Androscoggin River, which drains into Merrymeeting Bay, the estuary of the Kennebec River, and then into the Gulf of Maine. The east side of West Kennebago Mountain drains into the Kennebago River, then into Cupsuptic Lake, through a series of lakes into the Rapid River and Umbagog Lake, the source of the Androscoggin River. The north end of West Kennebago drains into Otter Brook, then into the Kennebago River. The west side of the mountain drains into the Little East Branch of the Cupsuptic River, then into Cupsuptic Lake. The south end of West Kennebago drains into Beaver Brook, then into the Cupsuptic River.

== Climate ==
Climate data for West Kennebago Mountain 45.1273 N, 70.8169 W, Elevation: 3,471 ft (1,058 m) (1991–2020 normals)
Month	Jan	Feb	Mar	Apr	May	Jun	Jul	Aug	Sep	Oct	Nov	Dec	Year
Mean daily maximum °F (°C)	15.1 (−9.4)	17.4 (−8.1)	26.1 (−3.3)	41.3 (5.2)	55.2 (12.9)	64.5 (18.1)	69.2 (20.7)	67.9 (19.9)	61.4 (16.3)	47.6 (8.7)	31.9 (−0.1)	21.2 (−6.0)	43.2 (6.2)
Daily mean °F (°C)	7.4 (−13.7)	9.3 (−12.6)	18.7 (−7.4)	32.4 (0.2)	46.4 (8.0)	55.9 (13.3)	60.6 (15.9)	59.1 (15.1)	52.0 (11.1)	38.4 (3.6)	26.0 (−3.3)	12.7 (−10.7)	34.9 (1.6)
Mean daily minimum °F (°C)	−0.4 (−18.0)	1.3 (−17.1)	11.2 (−11.6)	23.5 (−4.7)	37.7 (3.2)	47.3 (8.5)	52.0 (11.1)	50.3 (10.2)	42.5 (5.8)	29.2 (−1.6)	20.1 (−6.6)	4.3 (−15.4)	26.6 (−3.0)
Average precipitation inches (mm)	3.48 (88)	3.10 (79)	3.57 (91)	4.09 (104)	4.32 (110)	5.99 (152)	5.22 (133)	5.04 (128)	4.11 (104)	5.15 (131)	4.17 (106)	4.46 (113)	52.7 (1,339)
Source: PRISM Climate Group
