= Boundary Bald Mountain =

Mountain in Maine, United States

- Location within Maine

Highest point
- Elevation: 3,638 ft (1,109 m)
- Prominence: 2,010 ft (610 m)
- Listing: New England 50 Finest #42
- Coordinates: 45°46′01″N 70°12′14″W

Geography
- Location: Somerset County, Maine, U.S.
- Topo map: USGS Boundary Bald Mountain

Boundary Bald Mountain is a mountain located in Somerset County, Maine, about 7.5 mi (12.1 km) southeast of the Canada–US border with Quebec. Boundary Bald Mountain is flanked to the east by Ironbound Mountain, and to the west by Sandy Bay Mountain.

The north side of Boundary Bald Mountain drains via Alder Brook, Fish Brook, and Hale Brook (east to west) into the South Branch of the Penobscot River, then into the West Branch, the main stem of the Penobscot, and into Penobscot Bay. The south side of Boundary Bald Mountain drains via Churchill Stream, Upper Churchill Stream, and Heald Stream (east to west) into the Moose River, then into the Kennebec River, and into the Gulf of Maine.

== See also ==
- List of mountains in Maine
- New England Fifty Finest
