= Elephant Mountain (Oxford County, Maine) =

Mountain in Maine

- Location within Maine

Highest point
- Elevation: 3,772 ft (1,150 m)
- Prominence: 2,060 ft (630 m)
- Listing: New England Fifty Finest #40; New England 100 Highest #98
- Coordinates: 44°46′05″N 70°46′54″W

Geography
- Location: Oxford County, Maine, U.S.
- Topo map(s): USGS Metallak Mountain, Maine

Climbing
- Easiest route: trailless bushwhack

Elephant Mountain is a mountain located in Township C, Oxford County, Maine. Its northeastern end is in Township D, Franklin County. Elephant Mountain is flanked to the northeast by Bemis Mountain, and to the southeast by Old Blue Mountain.

The Appalachian Trail, a 2,170 mi (3,490 km) National Scenic Trail from Georgia to Maine, runs along the base of Elephant Mountain, 700 ft (210 m) below the summit.

Elephant Mountain stands in the watershed of the Androscoggin River, which drains into Merrymeeting Bay, the estuary of the Kennebec River, and then into the Gulf of Maine. The northwest side of the mountain drains into Metallak Brook, then into Upper and Lower Richardson lakes, the Rapid River, and Umbagog Lake, the source of the Androscoggin. The southwest side of Elephant Mountain drains into Birch Brook and Clearwater Brook, then into Black Brook, and the Ellis River, and the Androscoggin. The southeast side of the mountain drains into Mountain Brook, then into Berdeen Stream, and the Swift River, another tributary of the Androscoggin.

== Climate ==
Climate data for Elephant Mountain (ME) 44.7739 N, 70.7733 W, Elevation: 3,517 ft (1,072 m) (1991–2020 normals)
Month	Jan	Feb	Mar	Apr	May	Jun	Jul	Aug	Sep	Oct	Nov	Dec	Year
Mean daily maximum °F (°C)	19.2 (−7.1)	24.2 (−4.3)	29.1 (−1.6)	42.8 (6.0)	55.7 (13.2)	64.8 (18.2)	69.6 (20.9)	68.6 (20.3)	62.1 (16.7)	49.0 (9.4)	34.6 (1.4)	24.9 (−3.9)	45.4 (7.4)
Daily mean °F (°C)	11.7 (−11.3)	14.9 (−9.5)	20.3 (−6.5)	33.3 (0.7)	46.4 (8.0)	55.7 (13.2)	60.4 (15.8)	59.2 (15.1)	52.2 (11.2)	39.2 (4.0)	27.4 (−2.6)	16.1 (−8.8)	36.4 (2.4)
Mean daily minimum °F (°C)	4.2 (−15.4)	5.6 (−14.7)	11.4 (−11.4)	23.8 (−4.6)	37.0 (2.8)	46.6 (8.1)	51.2 (10.7)	49.7 (9.8)	42.3 (5.7)	29.4 (−1.4)	20.2 (−6.6)	7.4 (−13.7)	27.4 (−2.6)
Average precipitation inches (mm)	4.15 (105)	3.76 (96)	4.39 (112)	5.37 (136)	5.59 (142)	6.37 (162)	5.91 (150)	5.18 (132)	4.77 (121)	6.75 (171)	5.25 (133)	5.24 (133)	62.73 (1,593)
Source: PRISM Climate Group

== See also ==
- List of mountains in Maine
