= Little East Branch Cupsuptic River =

Location
- Country: United States

Physical characteristics
- Source: West Kennebago Mountain
  - location: Maine
  - coordinates: 45°06′05″N 70°50′07″W
- Mouth: Cupsuptic River
  - coordinates: 45°06′27″N 70°53′09″W
  - elevation: 1,811 feet (552 m)

The Little East Branch Cupsuptic River is a short tributary of the Cupsuptic River in Oxford County, Maine. It flows 2.6 miles (4.2 km) from its source on the slope of West Kennebago Mountain to its mouth on the Cupsuptic.

== See also ==
- List of rivers of Maine
