= South Brother =

Mountain in Maine, United States

- Location within Maine

Highest point
- Elevation: 3,970 ft (1,210 m)
- Prominence: 571 ft (174 m)
- Listing: New England 100 Highest #69
- Coordinates: 45°56′38″N 69°00′07″W

Geography
- Location: Piscataquis County, Maine, U.S.
- Topo map: USGS Doubletop Mountain

South Brother is a mountain located in Piscataquis County, Maine, in Baxter State Park. South Brother is flanked to the southwest by Mount Coe, and to the northeast by North Brother; collectively the two are called "The Brothers".

South Brother stands within the watershed of the Penobscot River, which drains into Penobscot Bay. The northeast and southeast sides of South Brother drain into a swampy area called "The Klondike", then into Wassataquoik Stream, and the East Branch of the Penobscot River. The west sides of South Brother drain into Roaring Brook, Nesowadnehunk Stream, and the West Branch of the Penobscot River.

The Appalachian Trail, a 2,170-mile (3,490 km) National Scenic Trail from Georgia to Maine, reaches it northern terminus, Mount Katahdin, 5 miles (8 km) to the southeast of The Brothers.

== See also ==
- List of mountains of Maine
- List of New England Hundred Highest
