= Traveler Mountain =

Mountain in Maine, United States

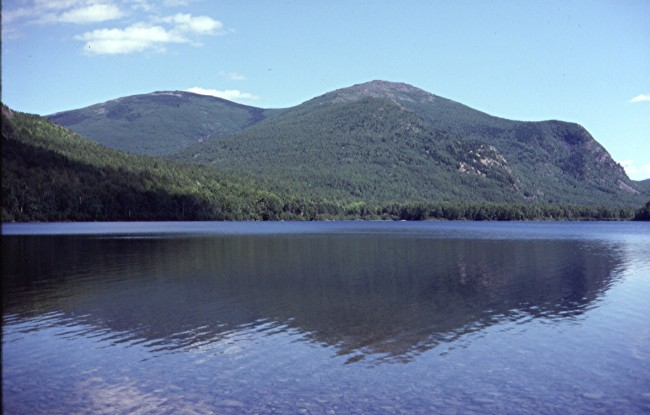
- Traveler Mountain, from Lower South Branch Pond, to the northwest

Highest point
- Elevation: 3,540 ft (1,080 m)
- Prominence: 2,346 ft (715 m)
- Listing: New England Fifty Finest #22
- Coordinates: 46°04′22″N 68°50′41″W

Geography
- Location within Maine
- Location: Piscataquis County, Maine, U.S.
- Topo map: USGS The Traveler

Traveler Mountain is a mountain located in Piscataquis County, Maine, in Baxter State Park. The Traveler, is the eighth-most prominent in Maine. Subsidiary peaks include the Peak of the Ridges 3,225 ft (983 m) North and South Traveler Mountain 3,144 ft (958 m) and 2,677 ft (816 m), respectively.

The Traveler stands within the watershed of the Penobscot River, which drains into Penobscot Bay on the coast of Maine. The east side of the Traveler drains into the East Branch of the Penobscot River. The north and west sides of the Traveler drain by several brooks into Trout Brook, then into Grand Lake Matagamon, the source of the East Branch of the Penobscot. The south side of the Traveler drains into the Pogy Brook, then into Wassataquoik Stream and the East Branch.

The Traveler was named by loggers using the East Branch of the Penobscot River. As any distant object will appear to do, it seemed to move along with them as they went down river. Upper and Lower South Branch Ponds are at the western base of the Traveler. Three ridges descend the western slopes of the mountain and provide access to the summit. These ridges are from North to South: North Traveler Ridge, Center Ridge and Pinnacle Ridge. North Traveler Ridge of course leads to the Northern summit. The other two ridges begin near the thoroughfare between the two ponds and proceed up to the peak of the ridges 3,225 ft (983 m). Both routes then merge on the way from the Peak of the Ridges to the summit of the Traveler.

== See also ==
- List of mountains in Maine
- New England Fifty Finest
