= Flight 277 =

Flight 277 may refer to:

Listed chronologically

- TWA Flight 277, crashed on 20 June 1944
- Prinair Flight 277, crashed on 5 March 1969
- Iran Air Flight 277, crashed on 9 January 2011
