= East Branch Cupsuptic River =

Location
- Country: United States

Physical characteristics
- Source
  - location: Maine
- Mouth
  - location: Cupsuptic River
  - elevation: 1,830 feet (560 m)

The East Branch Cupsuptic River is a short tributary of the Cupsuptic River in Maine. It flows about 4 miles (6 km) from its source (45°09′36″N 70°49′52″W) in a cirque between Snow Mountain and Twin Mountains, to its mouth on the Cupsuptic.

== See also ==
- List of rivers of Maine
