= Baker Mountain (Piscataquis County, Maine) =

Mountain in Maine, United States of America

- Location within Maine

Highest point
- Elevation: 3,521 ft (1,073 m)
- Prominence: 2,190 ft (670 m)
- Listing: New England Fifty Finest #31
- Coordinates: 45°34′16″N 69°23′38″W

Geography
- Location: Piscataquis County, Maine, U.S.
- Topo map: USGS Number Four Mountain

Baker Mountain is a wild, trail-less mountain located in Beaver Cove (TA.2 R.13&14, WELS), Piscataquis County, Maine. It is flanked to the northwest by Lily Bay Mountain. Elephant Mountain is about 2 miles (3 km) to the southwest, and White Cap Mountain is about 5 miles (8 km) to the east.

The east side of Baker Mountain drains into Baker Mountain Brook, then into the West Branch of the Pleasant River, the Piscataquis River, the Penobscot River, and into Penobscot Bay. The southwest side of Baker Mountain drains into North Brook, then into Upper and Lower Wilson Ponds, Eagle Stream, Big Wilson Stream, Sebec Lake, and the Sebec River, another tributary of the Piscataquis River. The northwest side of Baker Mountain drains into South Brook, then into Moosehead Lake, the source of the Kennebec River, which drains into the Gulf of Maine.

Baker Mountain sits on 4,300 acres (1,700 ha) of land purchased by the Appalachian Mountain Club in 2015. The southern slopes of the mountain are part of the Katahdin Iron Works conservation property.

== See also ==
- List of mountains in Maine
- New England Fifty Finest
