= Saddleback Mountain (Piscataquis County, Maine) =

Mountain in Maine, USA

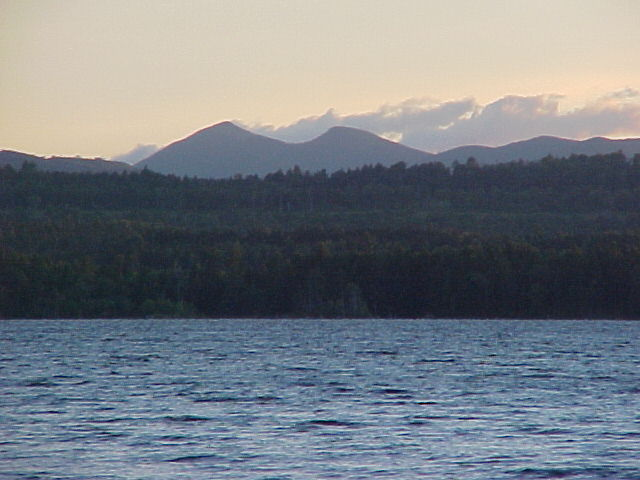
- Saddleback Mountain, seen from South Twin Lake, 15 miles (25 km) to the northeast

Highest point
- Elevation: 2,999 ft (914 m)
- Prominence: 1,854 ft (565 m)
- Listing: 48 New England Fifty Finest
- Coordinates: 45°30′34″N 69°08′10″W

Geography
- Location within Maine
- Location: Piscataquis County, Maine
- Topo map: USGS Big Shanty Mountain

Saddleback Mountain is a mountain located in Piscataquis County, Maine.

Saddleback Mountain stands within the watershed of the Pleasant River, which drains into the Penobscot River, and then into Penobscot Bay. The northeast end of Saddleback Mountain drains from Crater Pond into South Inlet Brook, then into B Pond, Guernsey Brook, and the East Branch of the Pleasant River. The easternmost part of Saddleback drains into Mud Gauntlet Brook, then into Ebeemee Lake, and the East Branch of the Pleasant River. The southeast side of Saddleback drains into the Middle Branch of the Pleasant River. The southwest end of Saddleback drains into Saddleback Brook, then into Silver Lake, and the West Branch of the Pleasant River. The northwest side of Saddleback drains into Big White Brook, then into Silver Lake.

== See also ==
- List of mountains in Maine
- New England Fifty Finest
