= East Mountain (Essex County, Vermont) =

Mountain in Vermont, United States

Highest point
- Elevation: 3,439 ft (1,048 m)
- Prominence: 2,230 ft (680 m)
- Listing: #29 New England Fifty Finest
- Coordinates: 44°39.88′N 71°46.21′W

Geography
- Location: Essex County, Vermont
- Topo map: USGS Seneca Mountain

East Mountain is a mountain located in Essex County, Vermont, in the "Northeast Kingdom". East Mountain is flanked to the north by Seneca Mountain.

East Mountain stands within the watershed of the Connecticut River, which drains into Long Island Sound in Connecticut. The north side of East Mountain drains into Madison Brook, thence into Paul Stream, and the Connecticut River. The southeast side of East Mtn. drains into Stony Brook and Fitch Brook, thence into Granby Stream, and into Paul Stream. The southwest side of East Mtn. drains into the East Branch of the Moose River, and thence into the Passumpsic River, another tributary of the Connecticut.

East Mountain is the site of the former USAF North Concord Air Force Station, a ground-based radar facility of the US military. Built in 1955, its name was changed to Lyndonville Air Force Station in 1962; it was closed in 1963. The North Concord AFS reported an unidentified flying object (UFO) sighting in 1961—a couple hours before the reported abduction of Barney and Betty Hill. The US military sighting lasted 18 minutes.

== Climate ==
Climate data for East Mountain (VT) 44.6656 N, 71.7758 W, Elevation: 3,219 ft (981 m) (1991–2020 normals)
| Month | Jan | Feb | Mar | Apr | May | Jun | Jul | Aug | Sep | Oct | Nov | Dec | Year |
|---|---|---|---|---|---|---|---|---|---|---|---|---|---|
| Mean daily maximum °F (°C) | 20.9 (−6.2) | 23.3 (−4.8) | 31.7 (−0.2) | 45.0 (7.2) | 58.3 (14.6) | 66.9 (19.4) | 71.3 (21.8) | 70.1 (21.2) | 63.5 (17.5) | 50.4 (10.2) | 36.6 (2.6) | 26.4 (−3.1) | 47.0 (8.4) |
| Daily mean °F (°C) | 11.1 (−11.6) | 12.4 (−10.9) | 21.2 (−6.0) | 34.4 (1.3) | 46.9 (8.3) | 55.8 (13.2) | 60.4 (15.8) | 59.0 (15.0) | 52.4 (11.3) | 40.7 (4.8) | 28.7 (−1.8) | 18.0 (−7.8) | 36.8 (2.6) |
| Mean daily minimum °F (°C) | 1.4 (−17.0) | 1.5 (−16.9) | 10.7 (−11.8) | 23.8 (−4.6) | 35.5 (1.9) | 44.8 (7.1) | 49.5 (9.7) | 48.0 (8.9) | 41.3 (5.2) | 31.0 (−0.6) | 20.8 (−6.2) | 9.7 (−12.4) | 26.5 (−3.1) |
| Average precipitation inches (mm) | 5.15 (131) | 4.06 (103) | 5.13 (130) | 5.03 (128) | 5.27 (134) | 6.14 (156) | 6.19 (157) | 5.89 (150) | 4.82 (122) | 6.79 (172) | 5.49 (139) | 5.70 (145) | 65.66 (1,667) |
Source: PRISM Climate Group

== See also ==
- List of mountains in Vermont
- New England Fifty Finest
