= Fort Mountain =

Fort Mountain can refer to

- Fort Mountain (Carroll County, Arkansas) , 1,686 ft (510 m)
- Fort Mountain (Izard County, Arkansas) , 784 ft (240 m)
- Fort Mountain (Connecticut) , 650 ft (200 m)
- Fort Mountain (Calaveras County, California) , 3,278 ft (1,000 m)
- Fort Mountain (Lassen County, California) , 5,948 ft (1,810 m)
- Fort Mountain (Shasta County, California) , 4,800 ft (1,460 m)
- Fort Mountain (Murray County, Georgia) , 2,848 ft (870 m)
- Fort Mountain (Union County, Georgia) , 2,621 ft (800 m)
- Fort Mountain (Maine) , 3,842 ft (1,170 m)
- Fort Mountain (New Hampshire) , 1,391 ft (420 m)
- Fort Mountain (British Columbia) "Fort Mountain". BC Geographical Names., 2,030 m (6,660 ft)

It is a variant name for

- Massanutten Mountain, Virginia , 2,690 ft (820 m)
- Square Butte (Cascade County, Montana) , 4,724 ft (1,440 m)

== See also ==
- Hillfort or mountain fort
- Mont Fort, a mountain
- Montfort (disambiguation)
