= Moxie Mountain =

Mountain in Maine, United States

- Location within Maine

Highest point
- Elevation: 2,936 ft (895 m)
- Prominence: 1,813 ft (553 m)
- Listing: 50 New England Fifty Finest
- Coordinates: 45°12′25″N 69°53′38″W

Geography
- Location: Somerset County, Maine, U.S.
- Topo map: USGS Caratunk

Moxie Mountain is a mountain located in Somerset County, Maine.

Moxie Mountain stands within the watershed of the Kennebec River, which drains into the Gulf of Maine. The northeast side of Moxie Mtn. drains into Big and Little Dimmick Ponds, then into Baker Pond, Moxie Pond, Moxie Stream, and into the Kennebec River. The north side of Moxie drains into Pleasant Pond, then into Pleasant Pond Stream, and into the Kennebec River. The west side of Moxie drains into Robinson Pond Outlet, then into Pleasant Pond Stream. The south side of Moxie drains into Heald Stream, then into Austin Stream and the Kennebec River.

The Appalachian Trail, a 2,170-mile (3,500-km) National Scenic Trail from Georgia to Maine, runs a few miles north of Moxie, across the summit of Pleasant Pond Mountain.

== See also ==
- List of mountains in Maine
- New England Fifty Finest
