= Grass Mountain (Vermont) =

Mountain in Vermont, United States

Highest point
- Elevation: 3,109 ft (948 m) NGVD 29
- Prominence: 2,189 ft (667 m)
- Listing: #30 New England Fifty Finest
- Coordinates: 43°03′10″N 73°13′24″W

Geography
- Location: Bennington County, Vermont
- Parent range: Taconic Mountains
- Topo map: USGS Arlington

Climbing
- Easiest route: unmaintained hiking trail

Grass Mountain is a mountain located in Bennington County, Vermont. Grass Mountain is flanked to the north by Big Spruce Mountain, and to the southeast by Spruce Mountain.

Grass Mountain stands within the watershed of the Hudson River, which drains into New York Bay. The north side of Grass Mountain drains into Batten Kill, thence into the Hudson River. The east side of Grass Mountain drains into Dry Brook, thence into Batten Kill. The south side of Grass Mountain drains into Little White Creek, thence into the Walloomsac River, the Hoosic River, and the Hudson. The west side drains into White Creek, thence into Owl Kill, the Hoosic River, and the Hudson.

== See also ==
- List of mountains in Vermont
- New England Fifty Finest
