= Snow Mountain (Franklin County, Maine) =

Mountain in Franklin County, Maine, United States

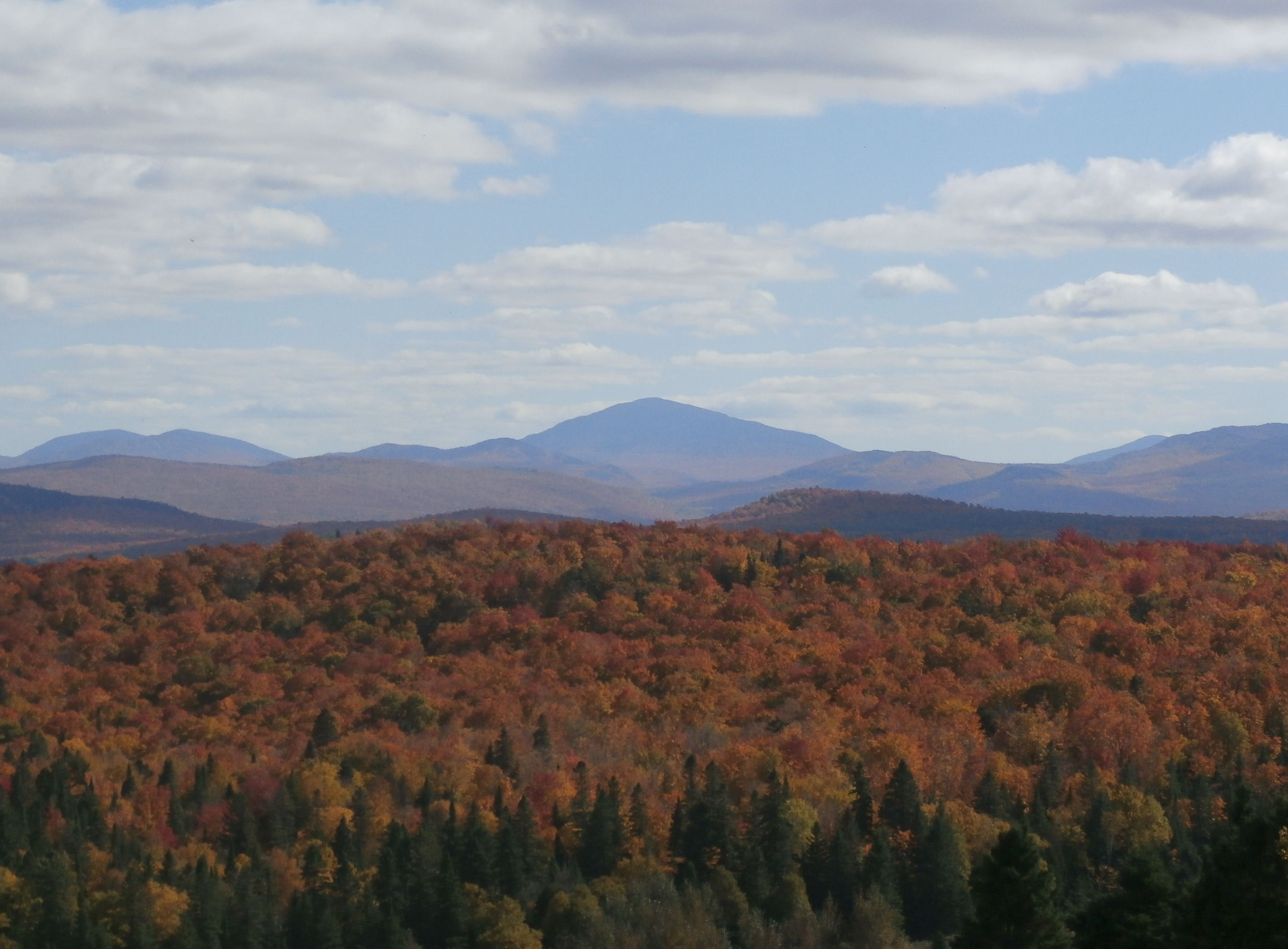
- Snow Mountain as seen from Piopolis, Quebec

Highest point
- Elevation: 3,960 ft (1,210 m)
- Prominence: 2,329 ft (710 m)
- Listing: New England Fifty Finest #24; New England 100 Highest #70
- Coordinates: 45°17′29″N 70°42′34″W

Geography
- Location within Maine
- Location: Franklin County, Maine, U.S.
- Topo map: USGS Chain of Ponds

Climbing
- Easiest route: Hiking trail

Snow Mountain is a mountain located in Franklin County, Maine, about 5 mi (8 km) from the Canada–United States border. Snow Mtn. is flanked to the northeast by Bag Pond Mountain, and to the southeast by Round Mountain.

The north side of Snow Mountain drains into Indian Stream, then into Chain of Ponds, the North Branch of the Dead River, Flagstaff Lake, the Dead River, the Kennebec River, and into the Gulf of Maine. The southeast side of Snow Mountain drains into Little Alder Stream, then into Alder Stream, and the North Branch of the Dead River. The north side of Snow Mountain drains into Big Island Pond, then into the Kennebago River, and the Androscoggin River, which drains into Merrymeeting Bay, the estuary of the Kennebec River.

== Climate ==
Climate data for Snow Mountain (ME) 45.2923 N, 70.7110 W, Elevation: 3,720 ft (1,134 m) (1991–2020 normals)
Month	Jan	Feb	Mar	Apr	May	Jun	Jul	Aug	Sep	Oct	Nov	Dec	Year
Mean daily maximum °F (°C)	14.6 (−9.7)	16.4 (−8.7)	25.0 (−3.9)	40.1 (4.5)	54.0 (12.2)	63.2 (17.3)	67.8 (19.9)	66.3 (19.1)	59.7 (15.4)	46.4 (8.0)	31.2 (−0.4)	20.5 (−6.4)	42.1 (5.6)
Daily mean °F (°C)	7.0 (−13.9)	8.7 (−12.9)	17.9 (−7.8)	31.5 (−0.3)	45.4 (7.4)	54.7 (12.6)	59.4 (15.2)	57.8 (14.3)	50.8 (10.4)	37.6 (3.1)	25.5 (−3.6)	12.2 (−11.0)	34.0 (1.1)
Mean daily minimum °F (°C)	−0.5 (−18.1)	1.0 (−17.2)	10.8 (−11.8)	22.8 (−5.1)	36.8 (2.7)	46.3 (7.9)	50.9 (10.5)	49.3 (9.6)	41.8 (5.4)	28.7 (−1.8)	19.7 (−6.8)	3.9 (−15.6)	26.0 (−3.4)
Average precipitation inches (mm)	5.16 (131)	3.96 (101)	3.84 (98)	4.12 (105)	5.79 (147)	7.80 (198)	6.45 (164)	6.94 (176)	4.79 (122)	6.12 (155)	4.43 (113)	4.94 (125)	64.34 (1,635)
Source: PRISM Climate Group

== See also ==
- Snow Mountain
- List of mountains in Maine
- New England Fifty Finest
- New England Hundred Highest
