= Big Moose Mountain =

Mountain in Maine, United States

- Location within Maine

Highest point
- Elevation: 3,196 ft (974 m)
- Prominence: 2,133 ft (650 m)
- Listing: 37 New England Fifty Finest
- Coordinates: 45°29′03″N 69°42′42″W

Geography
- Location: Piscataquis County, Maine, U.S.
- Topo map: USGS Big Squaw Pond

Big Moose Mountain, previously named Big Squaw Mountain, is a mountain located in Piscataquis County, Maine. Big Moose Mountain is flanked to the southeast by Little Moose (Little Squaw) Mountain.

The name of the mountain was changed in 2000, in accordance with a state law that required the renaming of all geographic features and locations in Maine called "squaw" or "squa".

Big Moose Mountain stands within the watershed of the Kennebec River, which drains into the Gulf of Maine. The northeast side of Big Moose Mountain drains into Moosehead Lake, the source of the Kennebec. The southeast end of Big Moose Mountain drains into Squaw Brook, then into Moosehead Lake. The southwest side of Big Moose Mountain drains into Indian Brook, then into Indian Pond and the Kennebec River.

Big Moose Mountain is the location of Big Squaw Mountain Resort, an alpine skiing area.

== See also ==
- List of mountains in Maine
- New England Fifty Finest
