= Squaw Township, Warren County, Iowa =

Township in Warren County, Iowa, U.S.

Coordinates: 41.205°N 93.616°W

Squaw Township is one of the sixteen townships of Warren County, Iowa, United States, and was established in 1836. Its estimated population as of 2020 is 737 people. Two unincorporated areas are in the township, Cool and Medora.

== See also ==
- Squaw
