= List of New England Fifty Finest =

List of prominent mountains in New England

The New England Fifty Finest is a list of mountains in New England, United States, used in the mountaineering sport of peak bagging. The list comprises the 50 summits with the highest topographic prominence — a peak's height above the lowest contour which encloses that peak and no higher peak. The list includes 20 peaks in Maine, 15 in Vermont, 14 in New Hampshire, and one in Massachusetts.

This list differs substantially from lists of peaks by elevation, such as the New England 4000 Footers. For instance, only one peak in the Presidential Range is on this list because the others do not have a major prominence, being connected to Mount Washington by ridgelines that are nowhere below 4,900 ft (1,490 m). Mount Washington has an elevation above sea level of 6,288 ft (1,917 m) but has a prominence of about 6,150 ft (1,875 m) because it stands that high above its key col — the lowest ground on the ridge line connecting Washington to the higher peaks of the southern Appalachian Mountains. Washington's key col is at the Champlain Canal in New York, the lowest ground on the water divide between the watersheds of the Hudson and Saint Lawrence Rivers.

Of the 48 New Hampshire Four-thousand Footers, only eight are also on this list, including Mount Lafayette and Carter Dome, which are the high points of the Franconia Range and the Carter-Moriah Range, respectively. The list includes several monadnocks, including the eponymous Mount Monadnock, and the high points of several small mountain ranges which have high prominence by virtue of their isolation from higher peaks by surrounding low ground.

== List ==
Rank	Peak	State	Prominence		Elevation	
1	Mount Washington	New Hampshire	6,150 ft	1,875 m	6,288 ft	1,917 m
2	Katahdin	Maine	4,290 ft	1,310 m	5,268 ft	1,606 m
3	Mount Mansfield	Vermont	3,640 ft	1,110 m	4,393 ft	1,339 m
4	Mount Lafayette	New Hampshire	3,360 ft	1,025 m	5,249 ft	1,600 m
5	Killington Peak	Vermont	3,320 ft	1,010 m	4,241 ft	1,291 m
6	Sugarloaf Mountain	Maine	3,180 ft	970 m	4,250 ft	1,295 m
7	Equinox Mountain	Vermont	3,060 ft	935 m	3,850 ft	1,175 m
8	Jay Peak	Vermont	2,975 ft	906 m	3,858 ft	1,176 m
9	Mount Moosilauke	New Hampshire	2,932 ft	894 m	4,802 ft	1,464 m
10	Mount Bigelow	Maine	2,855 ft	870 m	4,145 ft	1,263 m
11	Dorset Mountain	Vermont	2,840 ft	865 m	3,770 ft	1,150 m
12	Carter Dome	New Hampshire	2,821 ft	860 m	4,832 ft	1,473 m
13	Old Speck Mountain	Maine	2,720 ft	830 m	4,170 ft	1,270 m
14	Mount Cabot	New Hampshire	2,670 ft	815 m	4,170 ft	1,270 m
15	White Cap Mountain	Maine	2,610 ft	795 m	3,654 ft	1,114 m
16	Coburn Mountain	Maine	2,510 ft	765 m	3,717 ft	1,133 m
17	Mount Greylock	Massachusetts	2,470 ft	755 m	3,487 ft	1,063 m
18	Mount Putnam	Vermont	2,470 ft	755 m	3,642 ft	1,110 m
19	Saddleback Mountain	Maine	2,446 ft	746 m	4,120 ft	1,256 m
20	Kinsman Mountain	New Hampshire	2,420 ft	740 m	4,358 ft	1,328 m
21	Stratton Mountain	Vermont	2,410 ft	735 m	3,940 ft	1,201 m
22	The Traveler	Maine	2,340 ft	715 m	3,541 ft	1,079 m
23	Mount Shaw	New Hampshire	2,340 ft	715 m	2,990 ft	911 m
24	Snow Mountain	Maine	2,330 ft	710 m	3,960 ft	1,207 m
25	Mount Ascutney	Vermont	2,290 ft	700 m	3,140 ft	955 m
26	Kibby Mountain or	Maine	2,260 ft	690 m	3,654 ft	1,114 m
26	Caribou Mountain	Maine	2,260 ft	690 m	3,650±10 ft	1,112±3 m
27	Mount Carrigain	New Hampshire	2,240 ft	685 m	4,700 ft	1,435 m
28	Baldpate Mountain	Maine	2,240 ft	685 m	3,790 ft	1,155 m
29	East Mountain	Vermont	2,230 ft	680 m	3,439 ft	1,048 m
30	Grass Mountain	Vermont	2,200 ft	670 m	3,109 ft	948 m
31	Baker Mountain	Maine	2,190 ft	670 m	3,520 ft	1,073 m
32	Smarts Mountain	New Hampshire	2,190 ft	670 m	3,238 ft	987 m
33	Mount Monadnock	New Hampshire	2,160 ft	660 m	3,165 ft	965 m
34	Cold Hollow Mountains High Point	Vermont	2,160 ft	660 m	3,330 ft	1,015 m
35	Signal Mountain	Vermont	2,140 ft	650 m	3,370 ft	1,025 m
36	Mount Ellen	Vermont	2,132 ft	650 m	4,083 ft	1,244 m
37	Big Moose Mountain	Maine	2,130 ft	650 m	3,196 ft	974 m
38	Mount Kearsarge	New Hampshire	2,100 ft	640 m	2,937 ft	895 m
39	Doubletop Mountain	Maine	2,080 ft	635 m	3,489 ft	1,063 m
40	Elephant Mountain	Maine	2,060 ft	630 m	3,772 ft	1,150 m
41	Mount Osceola	New Hampshire	2,040 ft	620 m	4,340 ft	1,325 m
42	Boundary Bald Mountain	Maine	2,010 ft	615 m	3,638 ft	1,109 m
43	Gore Mountain	Vermont	1,982 ft	604 m	3,332 ft	1,016 m
44	Mount Cardigan	New Hampshire	1,922 ft	586 m	3,155 ft	962 m
45	Big Spencer Mountain	Maine	1,920 ft	585 m	3,206 ft	977 m
46	Camel's Hump	Vermont	1,880 ft	575 m	4,083 ft	1,244 m
47	Belknap Mountain	New Hampshire	1,850 ft	565 m	2,382 ft	726 m
48	Saddleback Mountain	Maine	1,850 ft	565 m	2,998 ft	915 m
49	Mount Blue	Maine	1,840 ft	560 m	3,190 ft	970 m
50	Moxie Mountain	Maine	1,820 ft	555 m	2,930 ft	895 m

== See also ==
- Adirondack High Peaks (the Forty-sixers)
- Four-thousand footers of New Hampshire
- List of New England Hundred Highest
- List of Quebec 1000 meter peaks
- Northeast 111, all 4000-footers of the Northeastern United States
