= Puzzle Mountain (Maine) =

Mountain in Oxford County, Maine

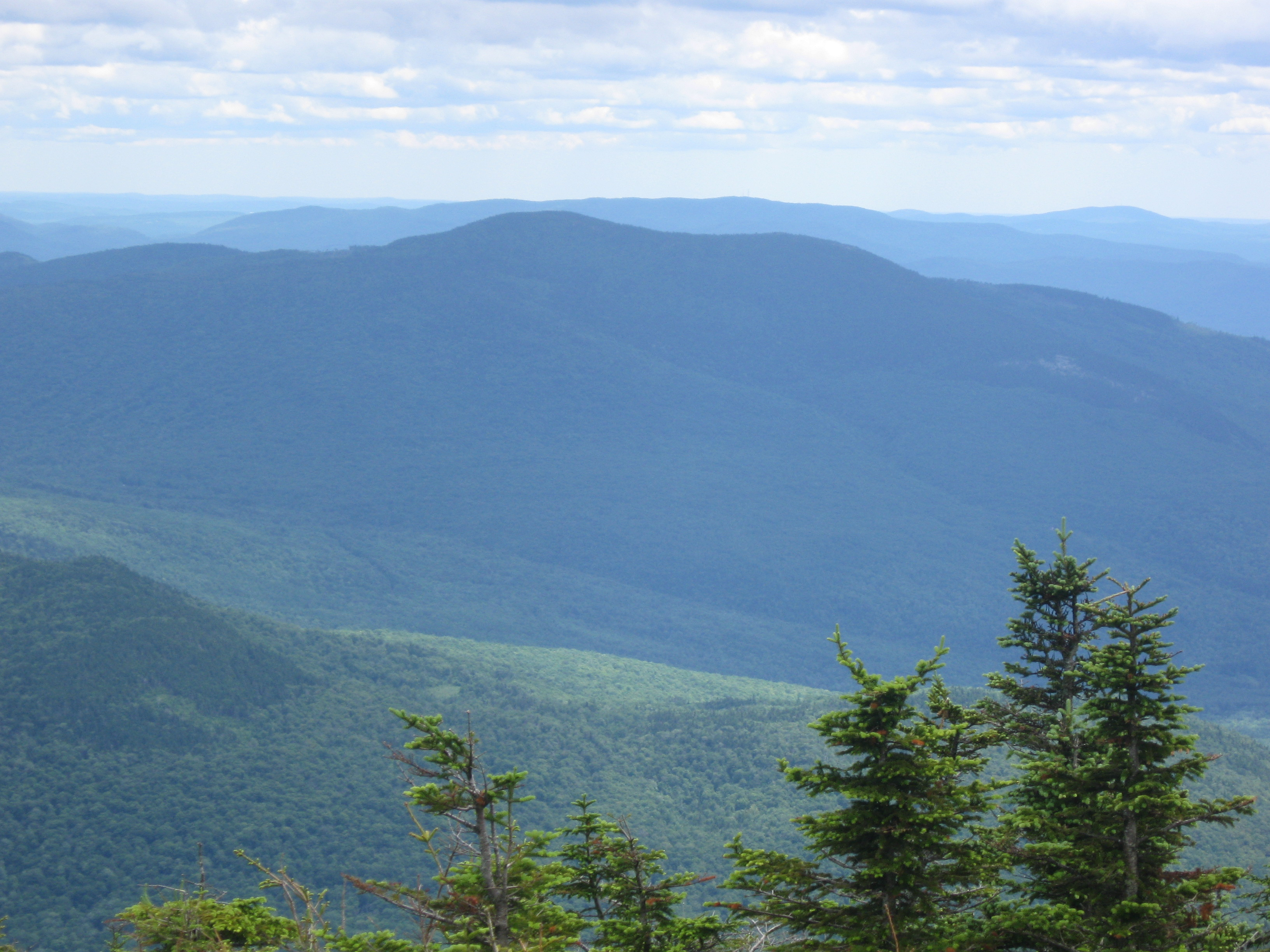
- Puzzle Mountain as seen from West Baldpate

Highest point
- Elevation: 3,133 ft (955 m)
- Prominence: 1,201 ft (366 m)
- Coordinates: 44°32′49″N 70°47′35″W

Geography
- Location within Maine
- Location: Oxford County, Maine, U.S.
- Parent range: Mahoosuc Range
- Topo map: USGS Mahoosuc Range

Climbing
- Easiest route: Hiking, class 1, 3.2 mi (5.1 km) ascent via Grafton Loop Trail

Puzzle Mountain is a mountain located in Oxford County, Maine, and is one of the easternmost mountains in the Mahoosuc Range. The mountain also has a false peak to the north-northwest of the true summit, known as Little Puzzle Mountain. Puzzle Mountain is in the watershed of the Androscoggin River.

== Trails ==
The summit of the mountain can be accessed from the southern trail head of the Grafton Loop Trail. The initial miles of the trail have a relatively low incline and utilize old logging roads for switchbacks. At about two miles, the trail makes a sharp turn to the left and begins to climb at a steeper grade. At about 2.4 miles, the trail reaches exposed granite boulders and ledges, with views of the Sunday River Ski Area, Grafton Notch, and the distant Presidential Range. The summit of Puzzle Mountain is at 3.2 miles and provides views in all directions as far as Sugarloaf Mountain. The trail takes approximately three hours and thirty minutes to summit.

The Woodsum Loop, nicknamed the "Loopette Trail", was built to access the various previously unreachable false peaks of the mountain. The Woodsum Loop feeds into the established Grafton Loop Trail. The total route is 7.6 miles, encompassing the entirety of the loop and back.

== See also ==
- List of mountains in Maine
- Mountains of Oxford County, Maine
