= Mount Coe =

Mountain in Maine, United States

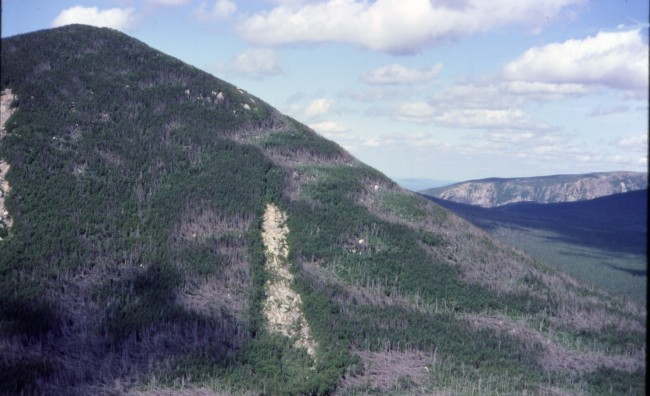
- Fir waves on Mount Coe

Highest point
- Elevation: 3,795 ft (1,157 m)
- Prominence: 315 ft (96 m)
- Listing: New England 100 Highest #90
- Coordinates: 45°56′01″N 69°00′32″W

Geography
- Location within Maine
- Location: Piscataquis County, Maine
- Topo map: USGS Doubletop Mountain

Climbing
- Easiest route: hiking trail

Mount Coe is a mountain located in Piscataquis County, Maine, within Baxter State Park, about 5.5 mi (9 km) northwest of Mount Katahdin. Mt. Coe is flanked to the northeast by South Brother, and to the southwest by Mount O-J-I. The Mount Coe trail starts at Slide Dam on Newsowdnehunk Stream east bank at around 1,190 ft (360 m). The trail goes up to the east for about 1.2 mi (1.9 km) and then goes right (south) along the drainage from the Mt. Coe slide bending to the east and then northeast. The last 0.5 mi (0.80 km) is up the slide featured on the left margin of the photo where the trail gains around 800 ft (240 m).

Mount Coe, ranked 22nd in height among Maine peaks, stands within the watershed of the Penobscot River, which drains into Penobscot Bay. The east side of Mt. Coe drains into a swampy area called "The Klondike", then into Wassataquoik Stream, and the East Branch of the Penobscot River. The northwest and southwest sides of Mt. Coe drain into Nesowdnehunk Stream, then into the West Branch of the Penobscot River.

== See also ==
- List of mountains in Maine
- New England Hundred Highest
