= Doubletop Mountain (Maine) =

Mountain in Maine, United States

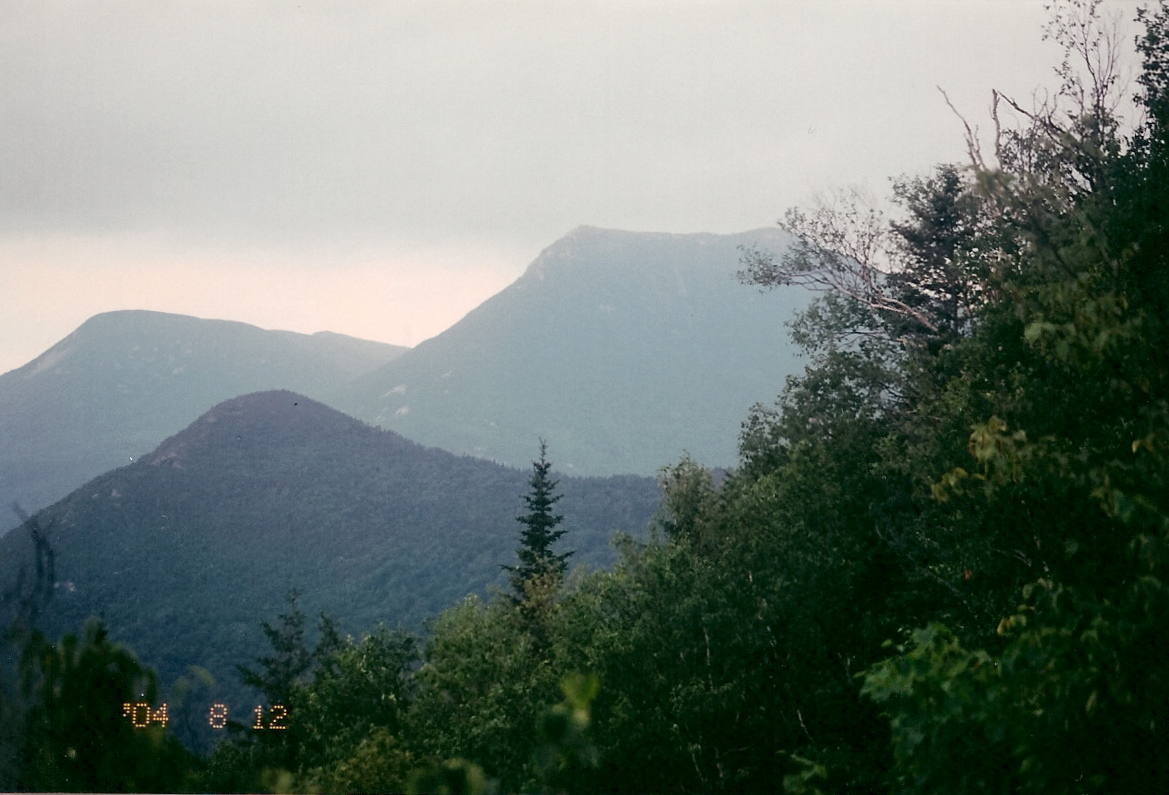
- Westward view from OJI to Doubletop before Storm August 12, 2004

Highest point
- Elevation: 3,489 ft (1,063 m) NGVD 29
- Prominence: 2,069 ft (631 m)
- Listing: New England Fifty Finest #39
- Coordinates: 45°56′09″N 69°03′40″W

Geography
- Location within Maine
- Location: Piscataquis County, Maine
- Parent range: Appalachians
- Topo map: USGS Doubletop Mountain

Doubletop Mountain is a mountain located in Piscataquis County, Maine, in Baxter State Park. According to Fannie Hardy Eckstorm, the mountain's Indigenous name was Psinskihegan-I-Outop. Psinskihegan means notch and I-Outop means head. In 1828 in the Survey of Maine, Moses Greenleaf called the mountain a variation Chinskihegan or Outop. It eventually became Doubletop, named for its two peaks.

The mountain's two peaks are a north peak (3,489 ft or 1,063 m) and a south peak (3,455 ft or 1,053 m). From the north a trail from the Nesowednehunk Campground to the north peak is 3.1 miles (5.0 km) long and another 0.2 miles (0.32 km) to the south peak. From Foster Field, to the south, a 4-mile (6.4 km) trail leads to the summit. The last third of mile (0.53 km) is steep and climbs about 900 feet (270 m). The north peak is wooded while the south peak is more open.

Beneath north peak, set in the rock, is a south facing bronze memorial tablet which reads:

KEPPELE HALL
JUNE 10, 1872—APRIL 25, 1926
HIS ASHES WERE GIVEN TO THE WINDS
AT THIS PLACE AUGUST 20, 1926, AT
SUNSET, BY HIS WIFE.
LOVE ONLY IS ETERNAL

Keppele Hall's wife, Fanny Hall, was the first American woman to serve as foreman of a grand jury.

== Geography ==
Doubletop Mountain stands within the watershed of Nesowadnehunk Stream, which drains into the West Branch of the Penobscot River, and into Penobscot Bay. It is flanked to the southwest by Squaw's Bosom.

== See also ==
- List of mountains in Maine
- New England Fifty Finest
