= Sandy Bay Mountain =

Mountain in Maine, United States

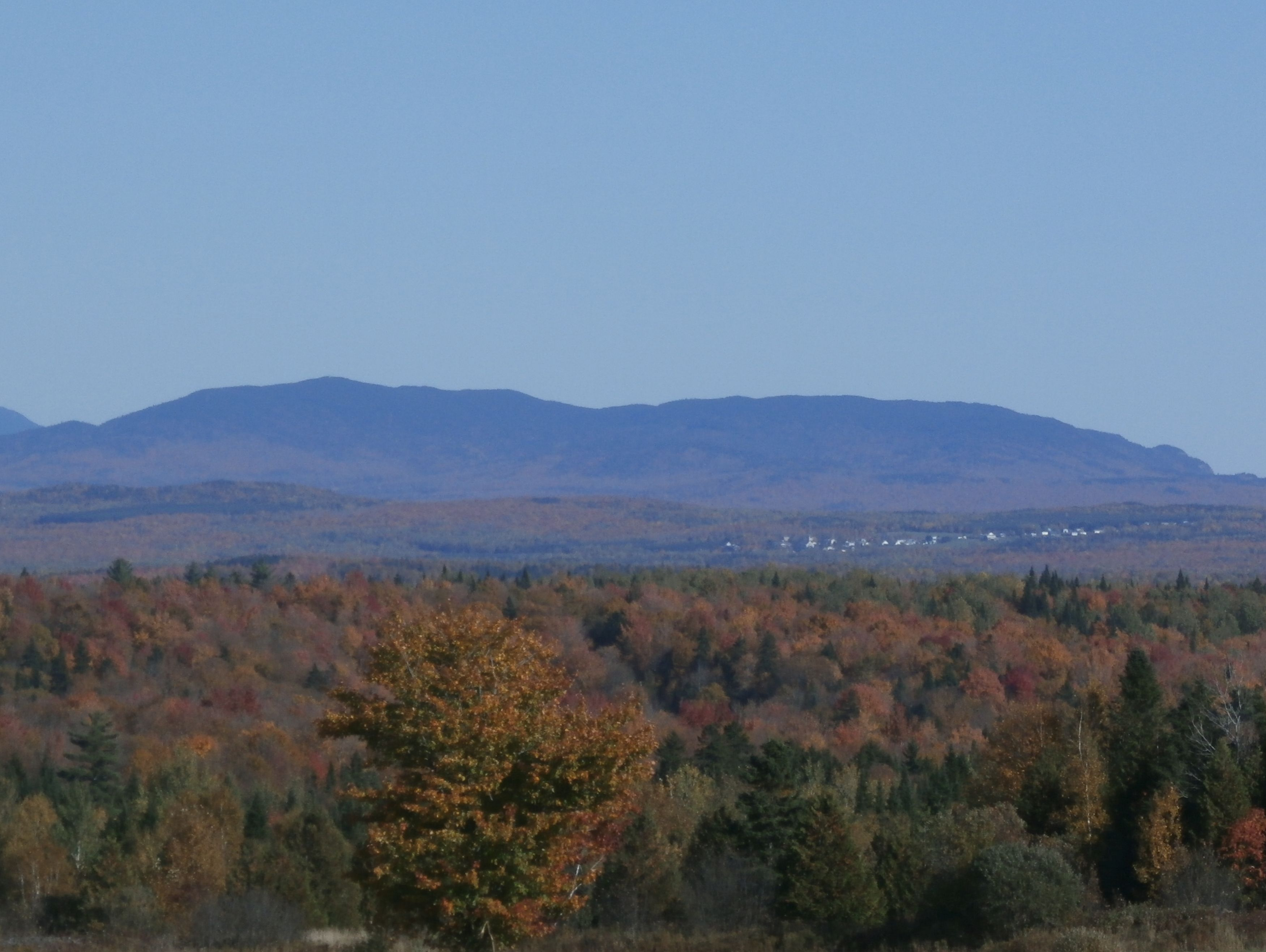
- View of Mount Bélanger behind the village of Saint-Robert-Bellarmin from Rang Ludgine in Lac-Drolet.

Highest point
- Elevation: 3,117 ft (950 m)
- Prominence: 1,142 ft (348 m)
- Coordinates: 45°45′16″N 70°23′38″W

Geography
- Location within Maine
- Location: Somerset County, Maine, U.S. / Le Granit Regional County Municipality, Quebec, Canada
- Topo map: NTS 21E16

Climbing
- Easiest route: hiking via the Mont Bélanger trails that begin in Saint-Robert-Bellarmin, Quebec

Sandy Bay Mountain, known officially in Quebec as Mont Sandy Stream, is a mountain located on the Canada–United States border, with a height of 950 m (3,117 ft) above sea level. The northeastern part of the mountain is in Somerset County, Maine, while the southwestern part is in Saint-Ludger, Quebec. There, it is unofficially known as Mont Bélanger.

== Geography ==
The mountain is flanked to the southeast by Slidedown Mountain.

=== Hydrography ===
Sandy Bay Mountain stands on the borders of three major rivers watersheds. The north side of Sandy Bay Mountain drains into the South Branch of the Penobscot River, then into the West Branch, the main stem of the Penobscot, and into Penobscot Bay. The east side of the mountain drains into the West Branch of Sandy Stream, then into the Moose River, the Kennebec River, and the Gulf of Maine. On its southwest side, the mountain drains into Ruisseau Noir, then into the Rivière du Loup, the Chaudière River, the Saint Lawrence River, and finally the Gulf of Saint Lawrence.

== See also ==
- List of mountains in Maine
