= Fort Mountain (Maine) =

Mountain in Maine, United States

- Location within Maine

Highest point
- Elevation: 3,867 ft (1,179 m)
- Prominence: 199 ft (61 m)
- Listing: #80 New England 100 Highest
- Coordinates: 45°57′44″N 68°58′29″W

Geography
- Location: Piscataquis County, Maine, U.S.
- Topo map: USGS Mount Katahdin

Fort Mountain is a mountain located in Piscataquis County, Maine, within Baxter State Park. Fort Mountain is flanked to the southeast by North Brother Mountain, and to the north by Mullen Mountain. Although officially trailless, a well-defined herd path leads to the summit of Fort from North Brother.

Fort Mountain stands within the watershed of the Penobscot River, which drains into Penobscot Bay. The south and east sides of Fort Mountain drain into Wassataquoik Stream, then into the East Branch of the Penobscot River. The northeast side of Fort Mountain drains into Annis Brook, then into Wassataquoik Stream. The northwest side of Fort drains into Little Nesowadnehunk Stream, then into Nesowadnehunk Stream, and the West Branch of the Penobscot River.

== 1944 C-54 plane crash ==
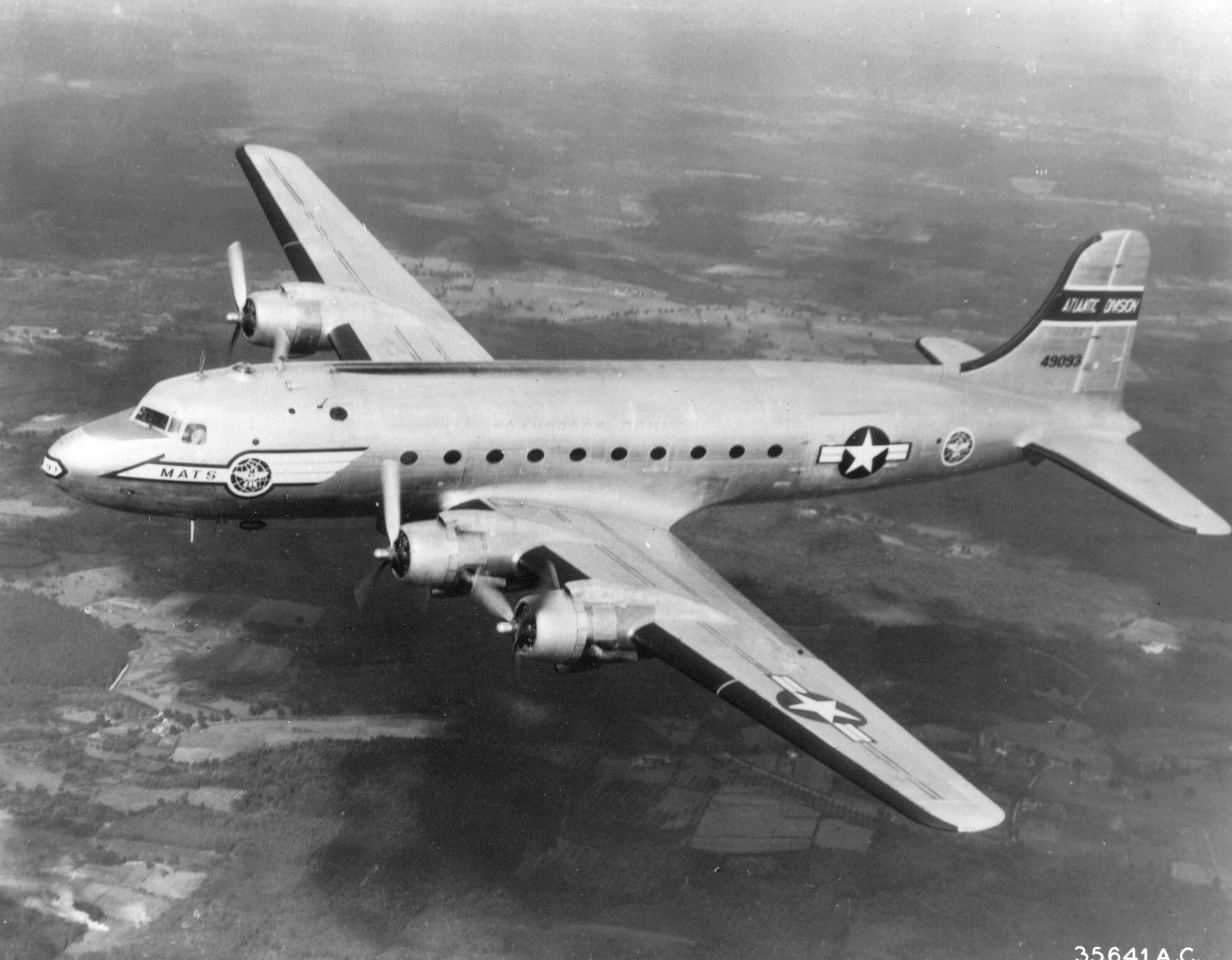
C-54 similar to the one which crashed on Fort Mountain.

On June 20, 1944, a C-54-A cargo plane on the Newfoundland to Washington, D.C. leg of trans-Atlantic TWA Flight 277 from England was pushed 70 miles (110 km) north of its planned course by stormy weather, which prevented obtaining visual or radio location fixes. The crew was unaware the aircraft had entered mountainous terrain and was still flying at the 4,000-foot (1,200 m) elevation appropriate for passing over Bangor, Maine. The single passenger and all six crewmen were killed when the aircraft hit Fort Mountain. The aircraft burned, but some large pieces are still accessible and reasonably well preserved.

== See also ==
- List of mountains in Maine
- New England Hundred Highest
