= Lobster Lake (Maine) =

Lake in Piscataquis County, Maine, United States

- Location within Maine Location within the United States
- Location: Piscataquis County, Maine
- Coordinates: 45°51′N 69°32′W
- Primary outflows: Lobster Stream
- Basin countries: United States
- Max. length: 4.7 mi (7.6 km)
- Max. width: 1.5 mi (2.4 km)
- Surface area: 3,380 acres (1,370 ha)
- Max. depth: 106 feet (32 m)
- Water volume: 88,897 acre⋅ft (109,653,000 m^{3})
- Surface elevation: 965 ft (294 m)

Lobster Lake in the North Maine Woods was named because its shape resembles the outline of a lobster claw. The larger eastern arm of the lake extending southward is Big Claw and a smaller western arm is Little Claw. Lobster Stream connects the northwest corner of the lake to the West Branch Penobscot River 1.4 miles (2.3 km) north of the lake. Lobster Lake and the river are at a similar elevation; so the West Branch may temporarily reverse flow through Lobster Stream into the lake during peak runoff events from the western Maine highlands along the Canadian border. The lake has self-sustaining populations of native lake trout and land-locked Atlantic salmon; but brook trout populations are suppressed by competition from yellow perch and white perch.
