= Big Moose Mountain Ski Area =

Ski area in Greenville, Maine

- Interactive map of Big Moose Mountain Ski Area
- Location: Big Moose Mountain
- Nearest city: Greenville, Maine, United States
- Coordinates: 45°30′15″N 69°42′20″W
- Top elevation: 2,920 feet (890 m)
- Base elevation: 1,300 feet (400 m)
- Trails: 33
- Lift system: 1

Big Moose Mountain Ski Area (previously known by the name Big Squaw Mountain Resort) is a ski area located in Maine's unorganized territory. Opened in 1963, the ski area is located on the north side of Big Moose Mountain (formerly Big Squaw Mountain until 2000), overlooking Moosehead Lake. The resort featured two chairlifts that covered 1,700 vertical feet.

After a chairlift accident and subsequent closure, the ski area operated on a limited basis from 2004 to 2010.

Friends of the Mountain, a community non-profit group (formerly "Friends of Squaw Mountain"), was later formed. It renovated the ski park and currently operates the resort.
