= TWA Flight 277 =

1944 aviation accident

Coordinates: 45°57′35″N 68°58′5″W

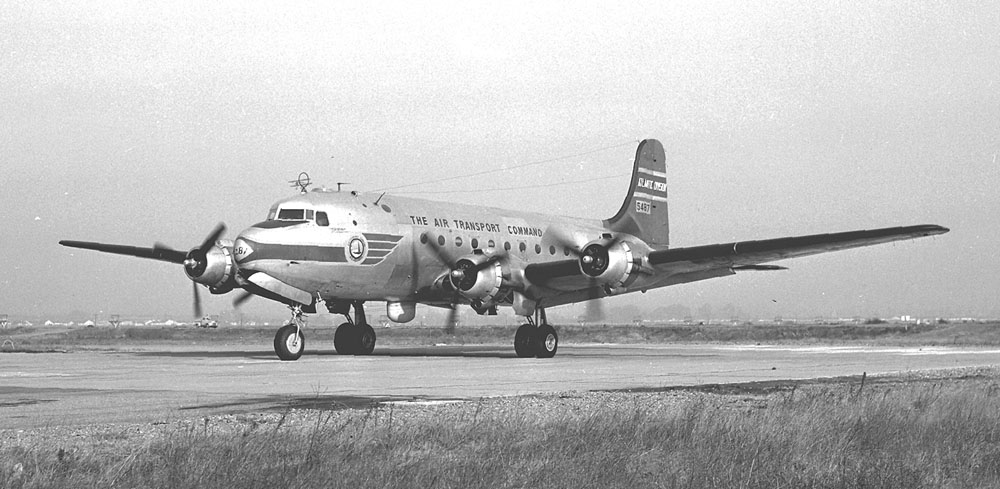
- A C-54 Skymaster similar to the accident aircraft

Accident
- Date: June 20, 1944
- Summary: Spatial disorientation
- Site: Fort Mountain, Northeast Piscataquis, Piscataquis County, Maine, USA

Aircraft
- Aircraft type: C-54 Skymaster
- Operator: Transcontinental and Western Airways
- Registration: 41-37227
- Flight origin: Stephenville, Newfoundland
- Destination: Washington D.C.
- Occupants: 7
- Passengers: 1
- Crew: 6
- Fatalities: 7
- Survivors: 0

Transcontinental and Western Air Flight 277 was a C-54 Skymaster en route from Stephenville, Newfoundland and Labrador, to Washington, D.C., on June 20, 1944. The aircraft crashed on Fort Mountain, in Maine's Baxter State Park. All seven on board died, including six civilian crewmembers and one United States Army Air Force passenger.

The flight was a scheduled contract flight for Air Transport Command. After taking off from Newfoundland, the aircraft encountered severe weather, including heavy rains, high winds, and lightning-induced radio static over New Brunswick and Maine which blew the aircraft 70 miles (110 km) off course. The pilot, Roger "Rolley" Inman, apparently did not realize that the aircraft, flying at less than 4,000 feet, had been blown into mountainous territory with peaks in excess of 5,000 feet. The aircraft's starboard wing struck a ridge of boulders at an elevation of 3,700 feet (1,100 m) on the mountain and the aircraft impacted the ground and was destroyed.
