= Great Pond Mountain =

Mountain in Maine, United States of America

- Location within Maine

Highest point
- Elevation: 1,029 ft (314 m)
- Prominence: 780 ft (240 m)
- Coordinates: 44°36′01″N 68°39′55″W

Geography
- Location: Hancock County, Maine, U.S.

Climbing
- Easiest route: Hiking, class 1

Great Pond Mountain, also known locally as Great Hill, is a mountain in Hancock County, Maine, United States. It is near Orland, Maine.
