= Cupsuptic River =

Location
- Country: United States

Physical characteristics
- Source
  - location: Maine
- Mouth
  - location: Cupsuptic Lake
  - elevation: 1,463 feet (446 m)

The Cupsuptic River is a 23.7-mile-long (38.1 km) river in Maine. It flows from its source (45°14′10″N 70°53′52″W) near the Canada–United States border to Cupsuptic Lake, the northern arm of Mooselookmeguntic Lake, which drains via other lakes into the Androscoggin River. Although short, the Cupsuptic River includes three of the highest mountains of New England — Kennebago Divide, Snow Mountain, and White Cap Mountain — within its watershed. The name "Cupsuptic" derives from the Abenaki language, meaning "a closed-up stream."

== See also ==
- List of rivers of Maine
