= Rapid River (Maine) =

River in the northwestern portion of the US state of Maine

Coordinates: 44°47′37″N 71°1′3″W

Location
- Country: United States

Physical characteristics
- Source
  - elevation: 1,402 ft (427 m)
- Mouth
  - elevation: 1,245 ft (379 m)

Rapid River is a 6.0-mile-long (9.7 km) river in the northwestern portion of the US state of Maine flowing from Lower Richardson Lake to Umbagog Lake. Despite its short length, it forms the end of a major portion of the Umbagog Lake and Androscoggin River watersheds. Much of this watershed is covered by (from downstream to upstream) Lower and Upper Richardson Lakes, Mooselookmeguntic Lake, Cupsuptic Lake and Rangeley Lake. The major tributaries of this system are the Cupsuptic, Kennebago and Rangeley rivers, all of which flow into Cupsuptic Lake.

True to its name, Rapid River contains class III–IV rapids for most of its length, including some good spots for playboating and riverboarding. Locals omit the word "the" when referring to the river. For example, "I went kayaking on Rapid River" not "I went kayaking on the Rapid River."

== See also ==
- List of rivers of Maine
