= Kennebago River =

- Location within Maine Location within the United States

Location
- Country: United States

Physical characteristics
- Source
  - location: Maine

The Kennebago River is a 30-mile-long (48 km) river in northwestern part of the U.S. state of Maine. It is a tributary of Cupsuptic Lake, an arm of Mooselookmeguntic Lake. Via a chain of lakes and the Rapid River, it is part of the Androscoggin River watershed.

== Kennebago Lake ==
Kennebago Lake
- Location within Maine Location within the United States
- Location: Franklin County, Maine
- Coordinates: 45°06′N 70°43′W
- Primary outflows: Kennebago River
- Basin countries: United States
- Max. length: 4.6 mi (7.4 km)
- Max. width: 1 km (1,100 yd)
- Surface area: 1,764 acres (714 ha)
- Max. depth: 116 feet (35 m)
- Water volume: 102,475 acre⋅ft (126,401,000 m^{3})
- Surface elevation: 1,778 ft (542 m)

The Kennebago River passes by the western end of Kennebago Lake 11 miles (18 km) upstream of Cupsuptic Lake. The lake extends southeasterly from the river in Stetsontown township into the northeast corner of Davis township. Kennebago Lake has a native population of brook trout, rainbow smelt, and land-locked Atlantic salmon.

== See also ==
- List of rivers of Maine
