= Topographic prominence =

Vertical measurement of the independence of a summit

With reference to peak B, contrast between topographic isolation and prominence

In topography, prominence (also referred to as autonomous height, and shoulder drop in US English, and drop in British English) is the height of the summit of a mountain or hill relative to the lowest contour line encircling it, but containing no higher summit within it. It is a measure of the independence of a summit. The key col ("saddle") around the peak is a unique point on this lowest contour line. The parent peak (if any) is some higher mountain, selected according to various criteria.

== Definitions ==
Figure 1. Vertical arrows show the topographic prominence of three peaks on an island. The dashed horizontal lines show the lowest contours that do not encircle higher peaks. Curved arrows point from a peak to its parent.

The prominence of a peak is the least drop in height necessary in order to get from the summit to any higher terrain. This can be calculated for a given peak in the following manner: for every path connecting the peak to higher terrain, find the lowest point on the path; the key col (or highest saddle, or linking col, or link) is defined as the highest of these points, along all connecting paths; the prominence is the difference between the elevation of the peak and the elevation of its key col. On a given landmass, the highest peak's prominence will be identical to its elevation. An alternative equivalent definition is that the prominence is the height of the peak's summit above the lowest contour line encircling it, but containing no higher summit within it; see Figure 1.

== Illustration ==
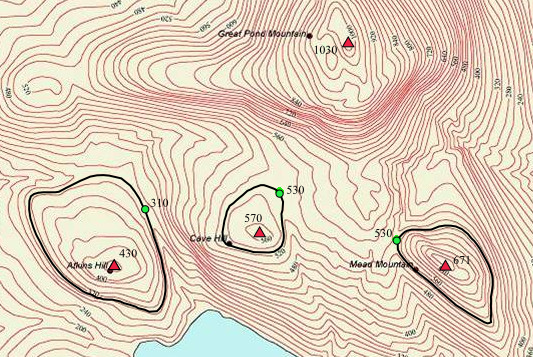
Topographic prominence of three peaks located in Maine, US, all near the higher Great Pond Mountain. Red triangles mark the four peaks, the lowest contour line encircling each of the three lower peaks are shown in black and the green dots mark the key cols that mark the starting point of prominence. The prominences are Atkins Hill: 430 − 310 = 120 ft, Cave Hill: 570 − 530 = 40 ft, Mead Mountain: 671 − 530 = 141 ft. The parent peak of each peak is Great Pond Mountain.

The parent peak may be either close to or far from the subject peak. The summit of Mount Everest is the parent peak of Aconcagua in Argentina at a distance of 17,755 km (11,032 miles), as well as the parent of the South Summit of Mount Everest at a distance of 360 m (1200 feet). The key col may also be close to the subject peak or far from it. The key col for Aconcagua, if sea level is disregarded, is the Bering Strait at a distance of 13,655 km (8,485 miles). The key col for the South Summit of Mount Everest is about 100 m (330 feet) distant.

A way to visualize prominence is to imagine raising sea level so the parent peak and subject peak are two separate islands. Then lower it until a tiny land bridge forms between the two islands. This land bridge is the key col of the subject peak, and the peak's prominence is its elevation from that key col.

One can also refer to it as the tallest possible path between the two peaks, where the key col is the lowest point on that path.

== In mountaineering ==
Prominence is interesting to many mountaineers because it is an objective measurement that is strongly correlated with the subjective significance of a summit. Peaks with low prominence are either subsidiary tops of some higher summit or relatively insignificant independent summits. Peaks with high prominence tend to be the highest points around and are likely to have extraordinary views.

Only summits with a sufficient degree of prominence are regarded as independent mountains. For example, the world's second-highest mountain is K2 (height 8,611 m, prominence 4,017 m). While Mount Everest's South Summit (height 8,749 m, prominence 11 m) is taller than K2, it is not considered an independent mountain because it is a sub-summit of the main summit (which has a height and prominence of 8,848 m).

Many lists of mountains use topographic prominence as a criterion for inclusion in the list, or cutoff. John and Anne Nuttall's The Mountains of England and Wales uses a cutoff of 15 m (49 ft), and Alan Dawson's list of Marilyns uses 150 m (490 ft). (Note: Dawson's list and the term "Marilyn" are limited to the British Isles.) In the contiguous United States, the famous list of "fourteeners" (14,000 foot / 4268 m peaks) uses a cutoff of 300 ft / 91 m (with some exceptions). Also in the U.S., 2000 ft (610 m) of prominence has become an informal threshold that signifies that a peak has major stature. Lists with a high topographic prominence cutoff tend to favor isolated peaks or those that are the highest point of their massif; a low value, such as the Nuttalls', results in a list with many summits that may be viewed by some as insignificant.

While the use of prominence as a cutoff to form a list of peaks ranked by elevation is standard and is the most common use of the concept, it is also possible to use prominence as a mountain measure in itself. This generates lists of peaks ranked by prominence, which are qualitatively different from lists ranked by elevation. Such lists tend to emphasize isolated high peaks, such as range or island high points and stratovolcanoes. One advantage of a prominence-ranked list is that it needs no cutoff since a peak with high prominence is automatically an independent peak.

== Parent peak ==
It is common to define a peak's parent as a particular peak in the higher terrain connected to the peak by the key col. If there are many higher peaks there are various ways of defining which one is the parent, not necessarily based on geological or geomorphological factors. The "parent" relationship defines a hierarchy which defines some peaks as subpeaks of others. For example, in Figure 1, the middle peak is a subpeak of the right peak, which is a subpeak of the left peak, which is the highest point on its landmass. In that example, there is no controversy about the hierarchy; in practice, there are different definitions of parent. These different definitions follow.

=== Encirclement or island parentage ===
Figure 2. Two closed contour lines meeting at peak A's key col

Also known as prominence island parentage, this is defined as follows. In Figure 2 the key col of peak A is at the meeting place of two closed contours, one encircling A (and no higher peaks) and the other containing at least one higher peak. The encirclement parent of A is the highest peak that is inside this other contour. In terms of the falling-sea model, the two contours together bound an "island", with two pieces connected by an isthmus at the key col. The encirclement parent is the highest point on this entire island.

For example, the encirclement parent of Mont Blanc, the highest peak in the Alps, is Mount Everest. Mont Blanc's key col is a piece of low ground near Lake Onega in northwestern Russia (at 113 m (371 ft) elevation), on the divide between lands draining into the Baltic and Caspian Seas. This is the meeting place of two 113 m (371 ft) contours, one of them encircling Mont Blanc; the other contour encircles Mount Everest. This example demonstrates that the encirclement parent can be very far away from the peak in question when the key col is low.

Figure 3. Diagram of a mountain range showing peaks and cols, from which mountain parentage and prominences can be determined

This means that, while simple to define, the encirclement parent often does not satisfy the intuitive requirement that the parent peak should be close to the child peak. For example, one common use of the concept of parent is to make clear the location of a peak. If we say that Peak A has Mont Blanc for a parent, we would expect to find Peak A somewhere close to Mont Blanc. This is not always the case for the various concepts of parent, and is least likely to be the case for encirclement parentage.

Figure 3 shows a schematic range of peaks with the color underlying the minor peaks indicating the encirclement parent. In this case the encirclement parent of M is H whereas an intuitive view might be that L was the parent. Indeed, if col "k" were slightly lower, L would be the true encirclement parent.

The encirclement parent is the highest possible parent for a peak; all other definitions indicate a (possibly different) peak on the combined island, a "closer" peak than the encirclement parent (if there is one), which is still "better" than the peak in question. The differences lie in what criteria are used to define "closer" and "better".

=== Prominence parentage ===
The (prominence) parent peak of peak A can be found by dividing the island or region in question into territories, by tracing the two hydrographic runoffs, one in each direction, downwards from the key col of every peak that is more prominent than peak A. The parent is the peak whose territory peak A is in.

For hills with low prominence in Britain, a definition of "parent Marilyn" is sometimes used to classify low hills ("Marilyn" being a British term for a hill with a prominence of at least 150 m). This is found by dividing the region of Britain in question into territories, one for each Marilyn. The parent Marilyn is the Marilyn whose territory the hill's summit is in. If the hill is on an island (in Britain) whose highest point is less than 150 m, it has no parent Marilyn.

Prominence parentage is the only definition used in the British Isles because encirclement parentage breaks down when the key col approaches sea level. Using the encirclement definition, the parent of almost any small hill in a low-lying coastal area would be Ben Nevis, an unhelpful and confusing outcome. Meanwhile, "height" parentage (see below) is not used because there is no obvious choice of cutoff.

This choice of method might at first seem arbitrary, but it provides every hill with a clear and unambiguous parent peak that is taller and more prominent than the hill itself, while also being connected to it (via ridge lines). The parent of a low hill will also usually be nearby; this becomes less likely as the hill's height and prominence increase. Using prominence parentage, one may produce a "hierarchy" of peaks going back to the highest point on the island. One such chain in Britain would read:

Billinge Hill → Winter Hill → Hail Storm Hill → Boulsworth Hill → Kinder Scout → Cross Fell → Helvellyn → Scafell Pike → Snowdon → Ben Nevis.

At each stage in the chain, both height and prominence increase.

=== Line parentage ===
Line parentage, also called height parentage, is similar to prominence parentage, but it requires a prominence cutoff criterion. The height parent is the closest peak to peak A (along all ridges connected to A) that has a greater height than A, and satisfies some prominence criteria.

The disadvantage of this concept is that it goes against the intuition that a parent peak should always be more significant than its child. However it can be used to build an entire lineage for a peak which contains a great deal of information about the peak's position.

In general, the analysis of parents and lineages is intimately linked to studying the topology of watersheds.

== Issues in choice of summit and key col ==
Alteration of the landscape by humans and presence of water features can give rise to issues in the choice of location and height of a summit or col. In Britain, extensive discussion has resulted in a protocol that has been adopted by the main sources of prominence data in Britain and Ireland. Other sources of data commonly ignore human-made alterations, but this convention is not universally agreed upon; for example, some authors discount modern structures but allow ancient ones. Another disagreement concerns mountaintop removal, though for high-prominence peaks (and for low-prominence subpeaks with intact summits), the difference in prominence values for the two conventions is typically relatively small.

== Examples ==
Chart showing relationships between the 100 peaks with highest prominence on Earth. (In the SVG version, hover over a peak to highlight its parent(s) and click it to view its article.)

The key col and parent peak are often close to the sub-peak but this is not always the case, especially when the key col is relatively low. It is only with the advent of computer programs and geographical databases that thorough analysis has become possible.

For example, the key col of Denali in Alaska (6,194 m) is a 56 m col near Lake Nicaragua. Denali's encirclement parent is Aconcagua (6,960 m), in Argentina, and its prominence is 6,138 m. (To further illustrate the rising-sea model of prominence, if sea level rose 56 m, North and South America would be separate continents and Denali would be 6138 m, its current prominence, above sea level. At a slightly lower level, the continents would still be connected and the high point of the combined landmass would be Aconcagua, the encirclement parent.)

While it is natural for Aconcagua to be the parent of Denali, since Denali is a major peak, consider the following situation: Peak A is a small hill on the coast of Alaska, with elevation 100 m and key col 50 m. Then the encirclement parent of Peak A is also Aconcagua, even though there will be many peaks closer to Peak A which are much higher and more prominent than Peak A (for example, Denali). This illustrates the disadvantage in using the encirclement parent.

A hill in a low-lying area like the Netherlands will often be a direct child of Mount Everest, with its prominence about the same as its height and its key col placed at or near the foot of the hill, well below, for instance, the 113-meter-high key col of Mont Blanc.

== Calculations and mathematics ==
When the key col for a peak is close to the peak itself, prominence is easily computed by hand using a topographic map. However, when the key col is far away, or when one wants to calculate the prominence of many peaks at once, software can apply surface network modeling to a digital elevation model to find exact or approximate key cols.

Since topographic maps typically show elevation using contour lines, the exact elevation is typically bounded by an upper and lower contour, and not specified exactly. Prominence calculations may use the high contour (giving in a pessimistic estimate), the low contour (giving an optimistic estimate), their mean (giving a "midrange" or "rise" prominence) or an interpolated value (customary in Britain).

The choice of method depends largely on the preference of the author and historical precedent. Pessimistic prominence, (and sometimes optimistic prominence) were for many years used in USA and international lists, but mean prominence is becoming preferred.

== Wet prominence and dry prominence ==
There are two varieties of topographic prominence: wet prominence and dry prominence. Wet prominence is the standard topographic prominence discussed in this article. Wet prominence assumes that the surface of the earth includes all permanent water, snow, and ice features. Thus, the wet prominence of the highest summit of an ocean island or landmass is always equal to the summit's elevation.

Dry prominence, on the other hand, ignores water, snow, and ice features and assumes that the surface of the earth is defined by the solid bottom of those features. The dry prominence of a summit is equal to its wet prominence unless the summit is the highest point of a landmass or island, or its key col is covered by snow or ice. If its highest surface col is on water, snow, or ice, the dry prominence of that summit is equal to its wet prominence plus the depth of its highest submerged col.

Because Earth has no higher summit than Mount Everest, Everest's prominence is either undefined or its height from the lowest contour line. In a dry Earth, the lowest contour line would be the deepest hydrologic feature, the Challenger Deep, at 10,924 m depth. Everest's dry prominence would be this depth plus Everest's wet prominence of 8848 m, totaling 19,772 m. The dry prominence of Mauna Kea is equal to its wet prominence (4205 m) plus the depth of its highest submerged col (about 5125 m). Totaling 9330 m, this is greater than any mountain apart from Everest. The dry prominence of Aconcagua is equal to its wet prominence (6960 m) plus the depth of the highest submerged col of the Bering Strait (about 40 m), or about 7000 m.

Mauna Kea is relatively close to its submerged key col in the Pacific Ocean, and the corresponding contour line that surrounds Mauna Kea is a relatively compact area of the ocean floor. Whereas a contour line around Everest that is lower than 9330m from Everest's peak would surround most of the major continents of the Earth. Even just surrounding Afro-Eurasia would run a contour line through the Bering Strait, with a highest submerged col of about 40 m, or only 8888 m below the peak of Everest. As a result, Mauna Kea's prominence might be subjectively more impressive than Everest's, and some authorities have called it the tallest mountain from peak to underwater base.

Dry prominence is also useful for measuring submerged seamounts. Seamounts have a dry topographic prominence, a topographic isolation, and a negative topographic elevation.

=== List of most prominent summits on Earth by 'dry' prominence ===
These are the 20 summits with the highest dry prominence. Prominence values are accurate to perhaps 100m owing to uncertainties in ocean sounding depths.

Summit	Landmass	Height (m)	Location	Dry prominence	Col height	Col location
Mount Everest	Afro-Eurasia	8844	27°59′17″N 86°55′31″E	Undefined or 19772	−10924	11°22.4′N 142°35.5′E (Challenger Deep)
Mauna Kea	Hawaii	4205	19.82°N 155.47°W	9330	−5125	13.29°N 166.54°W (SW of Hawaii)
Vinson Massif	Antarctica	4892	78°31′31″S 85°37′1″W	8272	−3380	60.58°S 39.26°W (S of South Georgia)
Piton des Neiges	Réunion	3069	21°05′54″S 55°28′51″E	7129	−4060	21.68°S 56.78°E (E of Reunion)
Aconcagua	Americas	6967	32°39′11″S 70°0′40″W	7007	−40	64.47°N 171.29°W (Bering Strait)
Mawson Peak	Heard Island, Kerguelen Plateau	2745	53°6′00″S 73°31′00″E	6395	−3650	63.90°S 82.94°E (S of Kerguelen Plateau)
Aoraki-Mount Cook	South Island, New Zealand	3724	43°35′42″S 170°8′31″E	6354	−2630	19.31°S 157.63°E (W of New Caledonia)
Mont Orohena	Tahiti, French Polynesia	2241	17°37′23″S 149°28′37″W	6341	−4100	17.22°S 147.69°W (E of Tahiti)
Silisili	Samoa	1858	13°37′06″S 172°29′09″W	6311	−4453	13.0°S 173.73°W (W of Samoa)
Pico do Fogo	Fogo, Cape Verde	2829	14°57′00″N 24°20′30″W	6190	−3361	17.59°N 22.06°W (NE of islands)
Queen Mary's Peak	Tristan da Cunha	2062	37°06′40″S 12°17′18″W	6179	−4117	32.44°S 1.64°W (W of Namibia)
Puncak Jaya	New Guinea	4884	04°04′44″S 137°9′30″E	6178	−1294	8.54°S 129.22°E (E of Timor)
Denali	Americas	6191	63.07°N 151.01°W	6144	47	9.16°N 79.93°W (Darien Gap)
Mount Paget	South Georgia	2935	54°26′S 36°33′W	5942	−3007	53.02°S 48.0°W (W of South Georgia)
Teide	Tenerife, Canary Islands	3715	28°16′23″N 16°38′22″W	5939	−2224	28.08°N 16.13°W (E of Tenerife)
Kilimanjaro	Africa	5895	03°04′33″S 37°21′12″E	5885	10	30.47°N 32.34°E (Suez Canal)
Pico Ruivo	Madeira	1861	32°45′31″N 16°56′32″W	5876	−4015	36.41°N 12.42°W (NE of Madeira)
Mount Pico	Pico, Azores	2351	38°28′08″N 28°23′56″W	5772	−3421	52.46°N 33.23°W (N Atlantic)
Pico de Desejado	Trindade, SE of Brazil	620	20°31′30″S 29°19′30″W	5567	−4947	20.56°S 29.70°W (W of Trindade)
Pico Cristóbal Colón	Americas	5720	10°50′18″N 73°41′12″W	5509	191	10.78°N 72.94°W (E of Sierra Nevada)

== See also ==
- Height above average terrain (HAAT) – a similar measurement for FM and TV transmitters
- Ultra-prominent summit

Lists

- List of mountain lists
- List of tallest mountains in the Solar System
- List of the most prominent summits of the world
  - List of ultra-prominent summits of Africa
  - List of ultra-prominent summits of Antarctica
  - List of ultra-prominent summits of Australia
  - List of ultra-prominent summits of the Alps
  - List of the most prominent summits of the British Isles
  - List of European ultra-prominent peaks
  - List of ultra-prominent summits of North America
    - List of the most prominent summits of Greenland
    - List of the most prominent summits of Canada
    - List of the most prominent summits of the Rocky Mountains
    - List of the most prominent summits of the United States
      - List of the most prominent summits of New England
    - List of the most prominent summits of Mexico
    - List of the most prominent summits of Central America
    - List of the most prominent summits of the Caribbean
  - List of ultra-prominent summits of South America
  - List of islands by highest point
