= North Branch Dead River =

River in Maine, United States of America

Location
- Country: United States

Physical characteristics
- Source
  - location: Maine
  - elevation: 1,275 feet (390 m)
- Mouth
  - location: Flagstaff Lake
  - coordinates: 45°09′48″N 70°26′18″W
  - elevation: 1,145 feet (350 m)
- Length: 19 mi (31 km)

Basin features
- Progression: Flagstaff Lake – Dead River – Kennebec River

The North Branch Dead River is a 19.3-mile-long (31.1 km) tributary of the Dead River in Franklin County, Maine. It is paralleled by Maine State Route 27.

From the outflow of Lower Pond (45°18′49″N 70°37′32″W) in Chain of Ponds (Maine Township 2, Range 6, WBKP), the river runs southeast to Eustis, where its confluence with the South Branch of the Dead River was drowned by the impoundment of Flagstaff Lake in 1950.

The Dead River played a role in the American Revolution. In the fall of 1775 then newly commissioned Colonel Benedict Arnold led a force of over 1000 men on a grueling trip through Maine, as part of the invasion of Canada. Ascending the Kennebec in bateaux, they portaged around the rapids of the lower Dead River, and proceeded up the North Branch, through the Chain of Ponds to Arnold Pond in Coburn Gore (T.2/3 R.6 WBKP), and across the height of land to Quebec's Chaudière River.

== See also ==
- List of rivers of Maine
