= Dead River (Kennebec River tributary) =

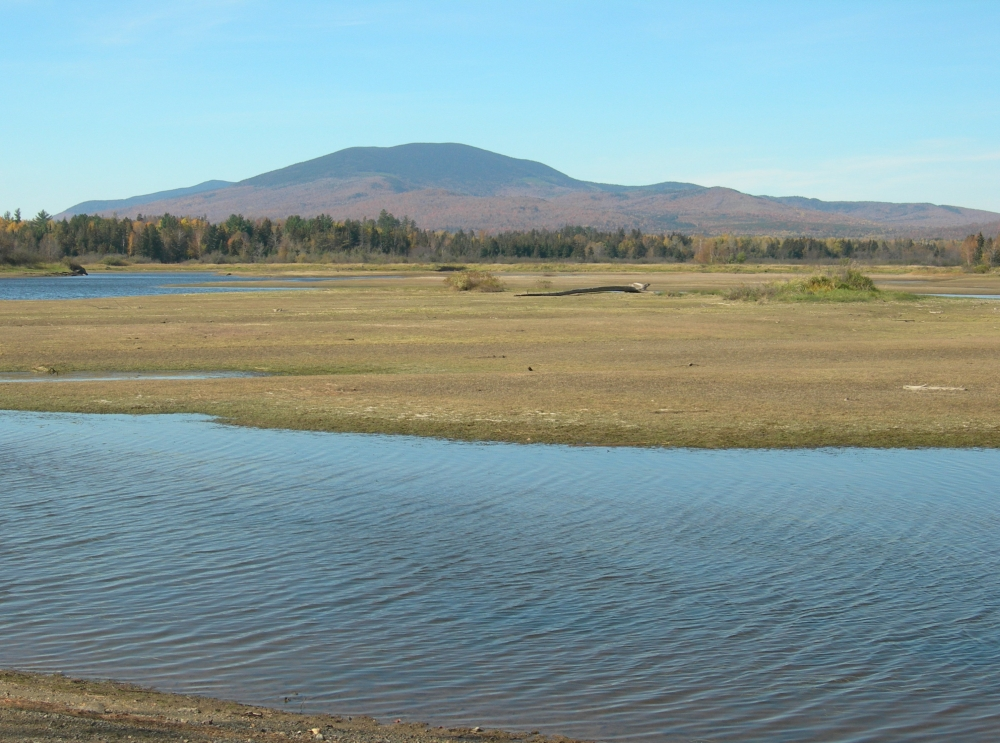
- Dead River showing East Kennebago Mountain

Location
- Country: United States

Physical characteristics
- Source
  - location: Maine
  - elevation: 1,145 feet (350 m)
- Mouth
  - location: Kennebec River
  - coordinates: 45°20′0″N 69°58′11″W
  - elevation: 570 feet (170 m)
- Length: 43 mi (69 km)

Basin features
- Tributaries
  - left: North Branch Dead River
  - right: South Branch Dead River

The Dead River, sometimes called the West Branch, is a 42.6-mile-long (68.6 km) river in central Maine in the United States. Its source is Flagstaff Lake, where its two main tributaries, South Branch Dead River and North Branch Dead River, join (45°09′41″N 70°25′55″W). It flows generally east to join the Kennebec River at The Forks, Maine.

The Dead River played a role in the American Revolution. In the fall of 1775 then newly commissioned Colonel Benedict Arnold led a force of over 1000 men on a grueling trip through Maine, as part of the invasion of Canada. Ascending the Kennebec in bateaux, they avoided the rapids of the lower Dead River via a portage of about 12 miles (20 km) at the "Great Carrying Place" (Carrying Place–Carrying Place Town, Maine Townships 1–2, Range 3, BKP WKR) to a position above Long Falls (now drowned in Flagstaff Lake). They proceeded up the North Branch of the Dead River, through the Chain of Ponds to Arnold Pond in Coburn Gore (T.2/3 R.6 WBKP), and across the height of land into the watershed of Quebec's Chaudière River.

The logging industry is prominent in the area. Flagstaff Lake was formed by Long Falls Dam in 1950, to regulate the flow of the Dead River into the Kennebec River. At the time, the river drive was still a primary means of delivering timber to the pulp mills downstream. Although improved highways and the trucking industry have replaced the river drive, water releases continue to serve hydroelectric power-generating plants downstream.

== Recreation ==
The Bigelow Mountain Range looks down from Flagstaff Lake's southern shore, making the Dead River region scenic.

It is a popular river with whitewater boaters and rafters. The whitewater releases are controlled from Flagstaff Lake, which has been dammed and made into a reservoir, and range from 1200 to 7000 ft³/s (35–200 m³/s) and range in difficulty from easy class 2 to class 4+. The length of the run is 15 miles (24 km) from the put-in at Spencer Stream to the take-out at West Forks with no easy access by road. Boaters must be prepared for at least 5 hours of paddling of varying difficulty. There are eight whitewater releases every rafting season with 7,000+cfs releases in the spring, 3500cfs in the summer and 6000cfs in the fall.

The Northern Forest Canoe Trail (NFCT) is a 740-mile (1,190 km) marked canoeing route extending from Old Forge, New York, to Fort Kent, Maine. From a four-mile portage between Wrangler on Wrangler Lake and Dallas Plantation on the South Branch, the trail runs about 35 miles (60 km) down the Dead River, to the mouth of Spencer Stream below Grand Falls.
