= East Kennebago Mountain =

Mountain in Maine, United States

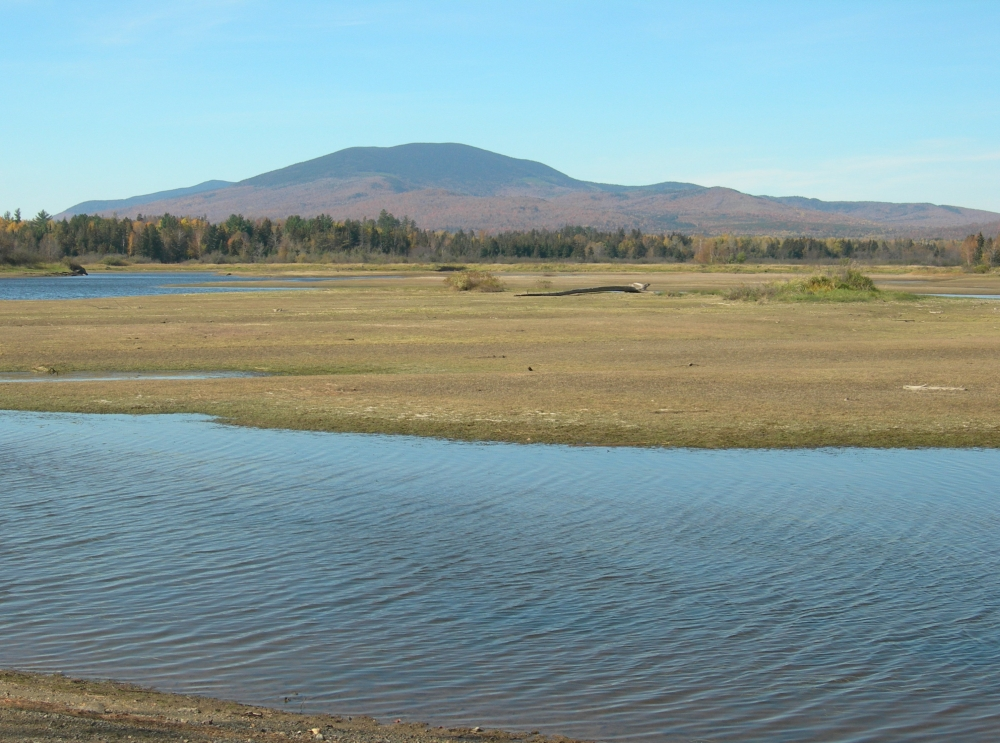
- East Kennebago Mt. seen from near Stratton

Highest point
- Elevation: 3,789 ft (1,155 m)
- Prominence: 1,804 ft (550 m)
- Listing: New England 100 Highest #91
- Coordinates: 45°07′19″N 70°35′59″W

Geography
- Location within Maine
- Location: Franklin County, Maine
- Topo map: USGS Quill Hill

Climbing
- Easiest route: logging roads, then bushwhack

East Kennebago Mountain is a trailless mountain located in Franklin County, Maine. East Kennebago Mtn. is a monadnock, flanked by its spurs: Tim Mountain to the north, Black Spur to the west, and Blackcat Mountain to the southwest.

The southeast side of East Kennebago Mountain drains into the South Branch of the Dead River, thence into Flagstaff Lake, the Dead River, and the Kennebec River, which drains into the Gulf of Maine. The northeast end of East Kennebago drains into Cherry Run, thence into the South Branch of the Dead River. The southwest end of East Kennebago drains into Kennebago Lake, thence into the Kennebago River, Cupsuptic Lake, through a series of lakes into the Rapid River and Umbagog Lake, the source of the Androscoggin River, which drains into Merrymeeting Bay, the estuary of the Kennebec River. The northwest side of East Kennebago drains into Big Sag Brook, thence into Kennebago Lake.

== Climate ==
Climate data for East Kennebago Mountain 45.1243 N, 70.5992 W, Elevation: 3,468 ft (1,057 m) (1991–2020 normals)
Month	Jan	Feb	Mar	Apr	May	Jun	Jul	Aug	Sep	Oct	Nov	Dec	Year
Mean daily maximum °F (°C)	15.1 (−9.4)	17.9 (−7.8)	25.6 (−3.6)	41.9 (5.5)	55.6 (13.1)	64.6 (18.1)	69.3 (20.7)	68.2 (20.1)	61.7 (16.5)	48.1 (8.9)	31.7 (−0.2)	20.6 (−6.3)	43.4 (6.3)
Daily mean °F (°C)	7.3 (−13.7)	9.6 (−12.4)	18.5 (−7.5)	32.7 (0.4)	46.7 (8.2)	56.0 (13.3)	60.7 (15.9)	59.3 (15.2)	52.1 (11.2)	38.6 (3.7)	25.9 (−3.4)	12.2 (−11.0)	35.0 (1.7)
Mean daily minimum °F (°C)	−0.4 (−18.0)	1.3 (−17.1)	11.3 (−11.5)	23.5 (−4.7)	37.8 (3.2)	47.4 (8.6)	52.1 (11.2)	50.4 (10.2)	42.5 (5.8)	29.2 (−1.6)	20.1 (−6.6)	3.9 (−15.6)	26.6 (−3.0)
Average precipitation inches (mm)	3.33 (85)	3.21 (82)	3.77 (96)	4.45 (113)	4.33 (110)	6.48 (165)	5.12 (130)	4.85 (123)	4.10 (104)	5.20 (132)	4.45 (113)	4.67 (119)	53.96 (1,372)
Source: PRISM Climate Group

== See also ==
- List of mountains in Maine
- New England Hundred Highest
