= South Branch Dead River =

Location
- Country: United States

Physical characteristics
- Source
  - location: Maine
  - elevation: 1,750 feet (530 m)
- Mouth
  - location: Flagstaff Lake
  - coordinates: 45°09′06″N 70°26′38″W
  - elevation: 1,145 feet (350 m)
- Length: 26 mi (42 km)

Basin features
- Progression: Flagstaff Lake – Dead River – Kennebec River

The South Branch Dead River is a 26.3-mile-long (42.3 km) tributary of the Dead River in Franklin County, Maine.

From the outflow of Saddleback Lake (44°58′30″N 70°33′18″W) below Saddleback Mountain, the river runs northeast to Eustis, where its confluence with the North Branch of the Dead River was drowned by the impoundment of Flagstaff Lake in 1950.

The Northern Forest Canoe Trail (NFCT) is a 740-mile (1,190 km) marked canoeing route extending from Old Forge, New York to Fort Kent, Maine. From a four-mile portage between Rangeley on Rangeley Lake and Dallas Plantation on the South Branch, the trail runs about 35 miles (60 km) down the South Branch, Flagstaff Lake, and the Dead River, to the mouth of Spencer Stream below Grand Falls.

== See also ==
- List of rivers of Maine
