= Flagstaff, Maine =

Former settlement in United States of America

Coordinates: 45°9′42.2″N 70°13′19.8″W

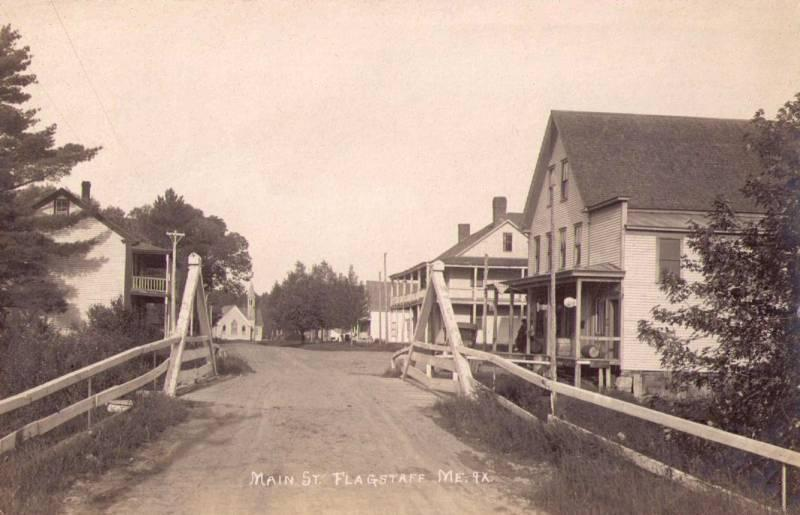
Main Street c. 1915

Flagstaff is a ghost town and former plantation in Somerset County, Maine, United States, near the existing town of Eustis and approximately 20 miles north of Rangeley.

Benedict Arnold camped here on his Quebec expedition and erected a flagstaff, hence the name.

The town was abandoned and dismantled (and legally disincorporated) in 1950 to allow construction of a hydroelectric dam on the Dead River, which enlarged Flagstaff Lake and submerged the site of the settlement.

The song "Below" by Slaid Cleaves on his 2004 album Wishbones refers to the destruction of the town, although it is not mentioned by name. The lyrics specifically mention the Dead River, and its general location.

== See also ==
- List of ghost towns in Maine
