= Coburn Gore–Woburn Border Crossing =

Canada–United States border crossing

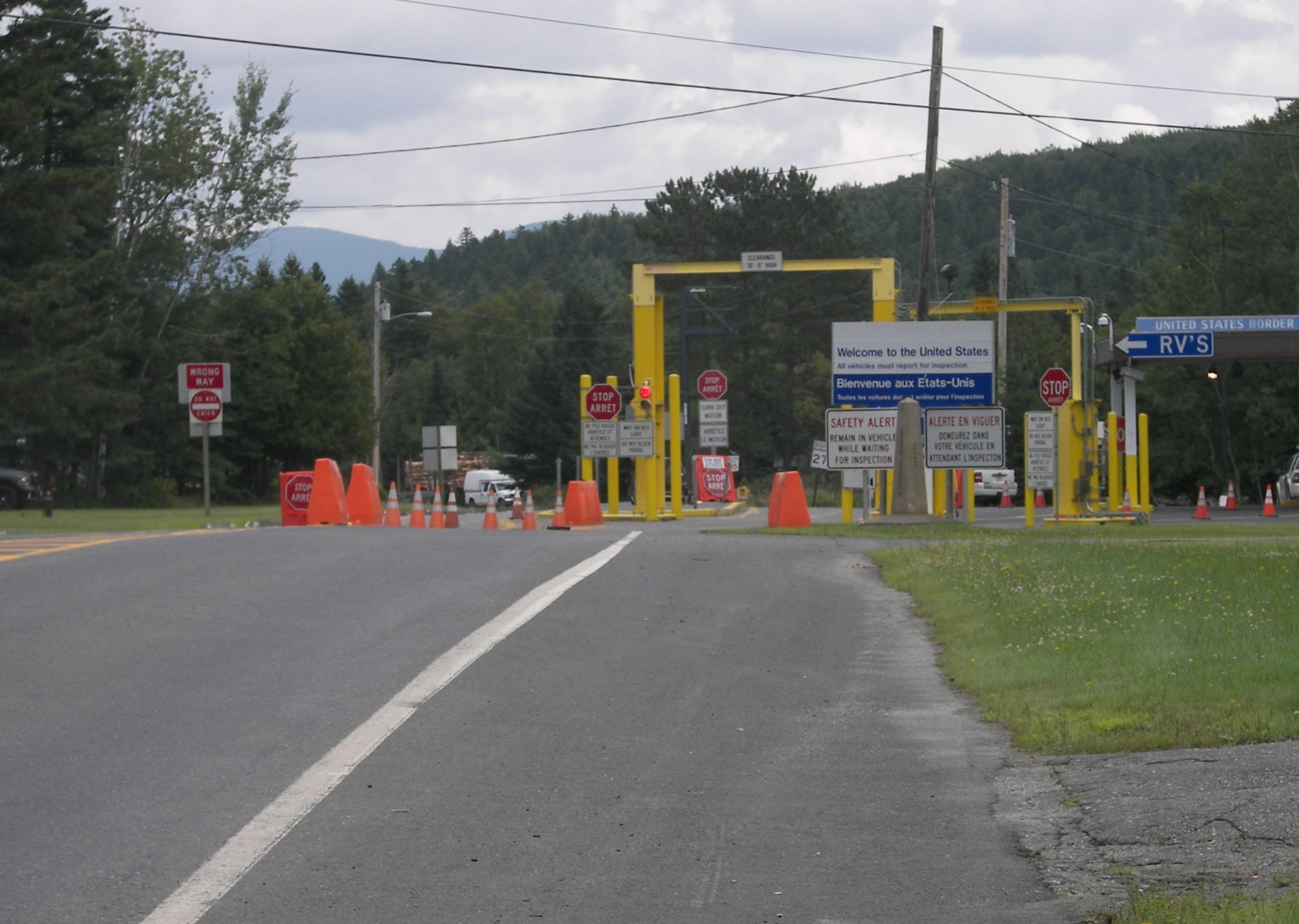
- The Coburn Gore–Woburn Border Crossing from the Canadian side

Location
- Country: United States; Canada
- Location: SR 27 / R-161; US Port: Maine State Route 27, Coburn Gore, ME 04936; Canadian Port: 1120 Chemin des Lignes (Quebec Route 161), Woburn, Quebec GOY 1RO
- Coordinates: 45.378652°N 70.80792°W

Details
- Opened: 1929

Website
- Official US website; Official Canadian website
- U.S. Inspection Station-Coburn Gore, Maine
- U.S. National Register of Historic Places
- MPS: U.S. Border Inspection Stations MPS
- NRHP reference No.: 14000558
- Added to NRHP: September 10, 2014

The Coburn Gore–Woburn Border Crossing connects the towns of Woburn, Quebec, and Coburn Gore, Maine, along the Canada–United States border. It is a land crossing, located where Quebec Route 161 and Maine State Route 27 meet. The U.S. border station, built in 1931, is listed on the National Register of Historic Places.

== United States station ==
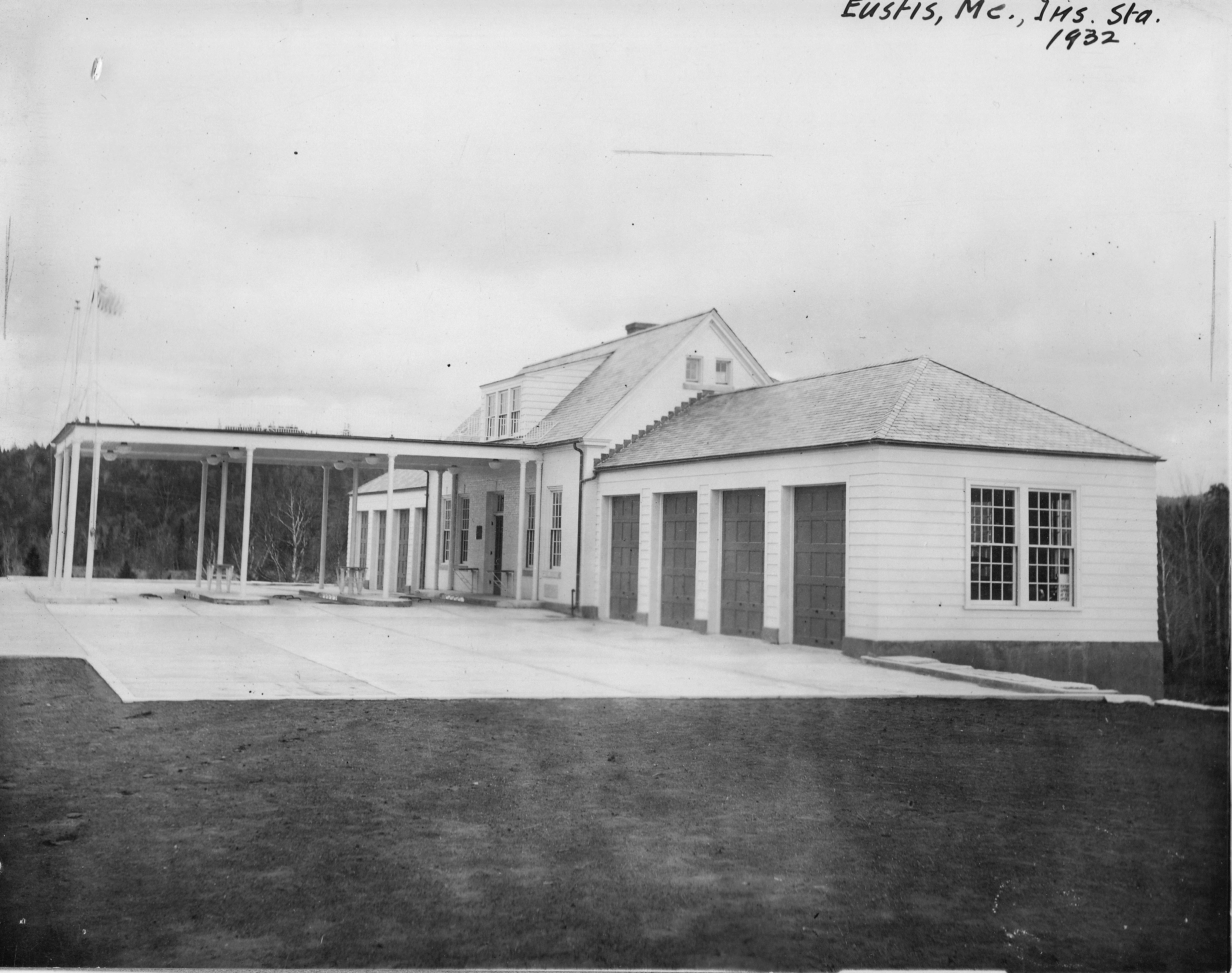
US border inspection station at Coburn Gore as seen shortly after construction in 1932

The US border inspection station is one of two paved crossings of the four in the Maine Highlands, and the westernmost in Maine. It is located in Coburn Gore, one of three gores and 13 townships that make up the unorganized area known as North Franklin, Maine. The nearest incorporated community is Eustis, about 22 miles (35 km) to the south. The facilities of the station occupy both sides of Route 27, with the main inspection building on the south side and a pair of residences on the north side. The inspection building is a 1 1/2-story wood-frame structure, finished in brick veneer, with single-story garage wings extending from either side. A metal porte-cochere extending across two lanes provides shelter to vehicles as they are processed crossing the border. The building interior is divided into three sections, with a central lobby area separating service areas for immigration and customs. The building's exterior and interior features retain much of their original Colonial Revival styling.

Across the highway from the inspection station stand two nearly identical residences. Both are single-story vernacular Cape style wood-frame structures clad in vinyl siding. They are basically rectangular, with a shed-roof section projecting from the front. The projecting section has the main entrance at the center, flanked by narrow windows. The outer bays of the front facade have standard sash windows.

The Coburn Gore station was built in 1931, during the first phase of a major program in which the United States government sought to improve its border security while producing jobs during the Great Depression. This program was motivated by rampant smuggling during Prohibition, the increased use of the automobile, the introduction of immigration quotas based on the country of origin, and an increase in smuggling that was a consequence of Prohibition. Due to the remote location, this station was built to include housing for its principal officers. The designs of the buildings generally follow standard drawings developed for border stations built during this period. The border station was listed on the United States National Register of Historic Places in 2014.

== Canada border station ==
Woburn, whose actual name is Saint-Augustin-de-Woburn, was founded in 1880 and has historically thrived in the wood processing industry. The Canada border station at Woburn was built in 1950, and has had many renovations over the years.

== See also ==
- List of Canada–United States border crossings
- National Register of Historic Places listings in Franklin County, Maine
