= List of ghost towns in Maine =

This is an incomplete list of ghost towns in Maine.

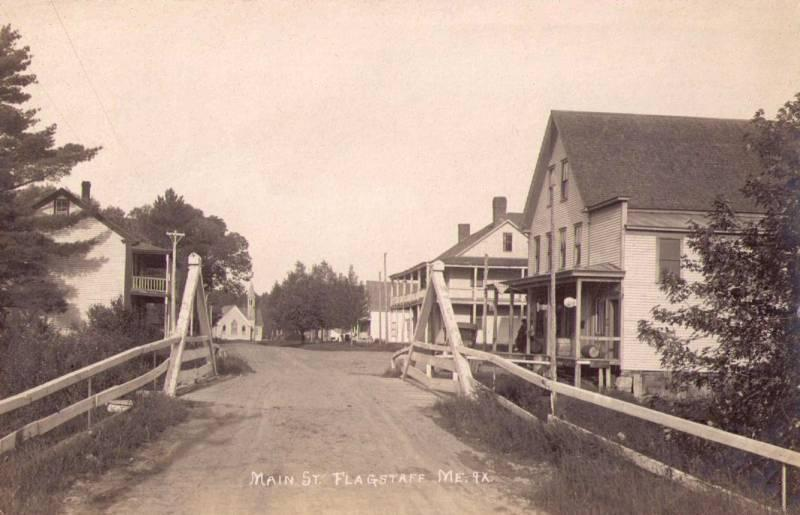
Main Street, Flagstaff, Maine, circa 1915

Ghost Towns in Maine
Name	County	Notes	Refs
Appledore	York County	Located on Appledore Island in the Isles of Shoals in Kittery.	
Askwith	Piscataquis County	Now named Tarratine, located just south of Brassua Lake.	
Danville	Androscoggin County	A former populated place and historic site in Auburn.	
Davidson	Penobscot County	An extinct logging village.	
Flagstaff	Somerset County	Destroyed and flooded to create Flagstaff Lake.	
Fort Kent Mills	Aroostook County	A small village in Fort Kent.	
Freeman	Franklin County	Incorporated in 1808 as part of the Little River plantation, ceased to exist in 1937.	
Greenfield	Penobscot County	An extinct plantation village.	
Hastings	Oxford County	A plantation near the New Hampshire border.	
Hibbert's Gore	Lincoln County	An uninhabited gore in northern Lincoln County.	
Katadhin Iron Works	Piscataquis County	An iron smelting village in the National Register of Historic Places.	
Keens Mills	Androscoggin County	A small village in Turner.	
Lang	Franklin County	An extinct plantation.	
Ligonia Village	Cumberland County	An Irish settlement in South Portland.	
Malaga Island	Sagadahoc County	A village on Malaga Island.	
Pejepscot	Sagadahoc County	An historic colonial settlement in Topsham.	
Perkins Township	Sagadahoc County	A small settlement on Swan Island in the Kennebec River.	
Riceville	Hancock County	A tannery village, also known as Township 39.	
