= East Central Penobscot, Maine =

- Unorganized territory
- Location within Maine Location within the United States
- Coordinates: 45°08′31″N 68°24′04″W
- Country: United States
- State: Maine
- County: Penobscot

Area
  - Total: 115.8 sq mi (299.9 km^{2})
  - Land: 114.5 sq mi (296.5 km^{2})
  - Water: 1.3 sq mi (3.4 km^{2})
- Elevation: 479 ft (146 m)

Population (2020)
  - Total: 308
  - Density: 2.69/sq mi (1.04/km^{2})
- Time zone: UTC-5 (Eastern (EST))
  - Summer (DST): UTC-4 (EDT)
- ZIP Codes: 04417 (Burlington); 04418 (Greenbush); 04493 (West Enfield)
- Area code: 207
- FIPS code: 23-19868
- GNIS feature ID: 582454

East Central Penobscot is an unorganized territory in Penobscot County, Maine, United States. The population was 308 at the 2020 census.

== Geography ==
According to the United States Census Bureau, the unorganized territory has a total area of 115.8 square miles (299.9 km^{2}), of which 114.5 square miles (296.5 km^{2}) is land and 1.3 square miles (3.4 km^{2}), or 1.12%, is water.

The territory consists of three townships: Summit, Grand Falls, and Greenfield.

== Demographics ==
Historical population
Census	Pop.	Note	%±
1990	12		—
2000	324		2,600.0%
2010	343		5.9%
2020	308		−10.2%
U.S. Decennial Census

As of the census of 2000, there were 324 people, 126 households, and 84 families residing in the unorganized territory. The population density was 2.8 inhabitants per square mile (1.1/km^{2}). There were 291 housing units at an average density of 2.5 per square mile (0.97/km^{2}). The racial makeup of the unorganized territory was 98.77% White, 0.62% Native American, and 0.62% from two or more races. Hispanic or Latino of any race were 0.62% of the population.

There were 126 households, out of which 37.3% had children under the age of 18 living with them, 52.4% were married couples living together, 9.5% had a female householder with no husband present, and 33.3% were non-families. 24.6% of all households were made up of individuals, and 7.9% had someone living alone who was 65 years of age or older. The average household size was 2.57 and the average family size was 3.07.

In the unorganized territory the population was spread out, with 28.4% under the age of 18, 4.6% from 18 to 24, 36.1% from 25 to 44, 22.2% from 45 to 64, and 8.6% who were 65 years of age or older. The median age was 36 years. For every 100 females, there were 113.2 males. For every 100 females age 18 and over, there were 109.0 males.

The median income for a household in the unorganized territory was $39,375, and the median income for a family was $40,313. Males had a median income of $32,000 versus $21,000 for females. The per capita income for the unorganized territory was $16,916. About 6.5% of families and 15.4% of the population were below the poverty line, including 12.3% of those under age 18 and 9.1% of those age 65 or over.
