= Bigelow Preserve =

Protected area in Maine, United States

- IUCN category IV (habitat/species management area)
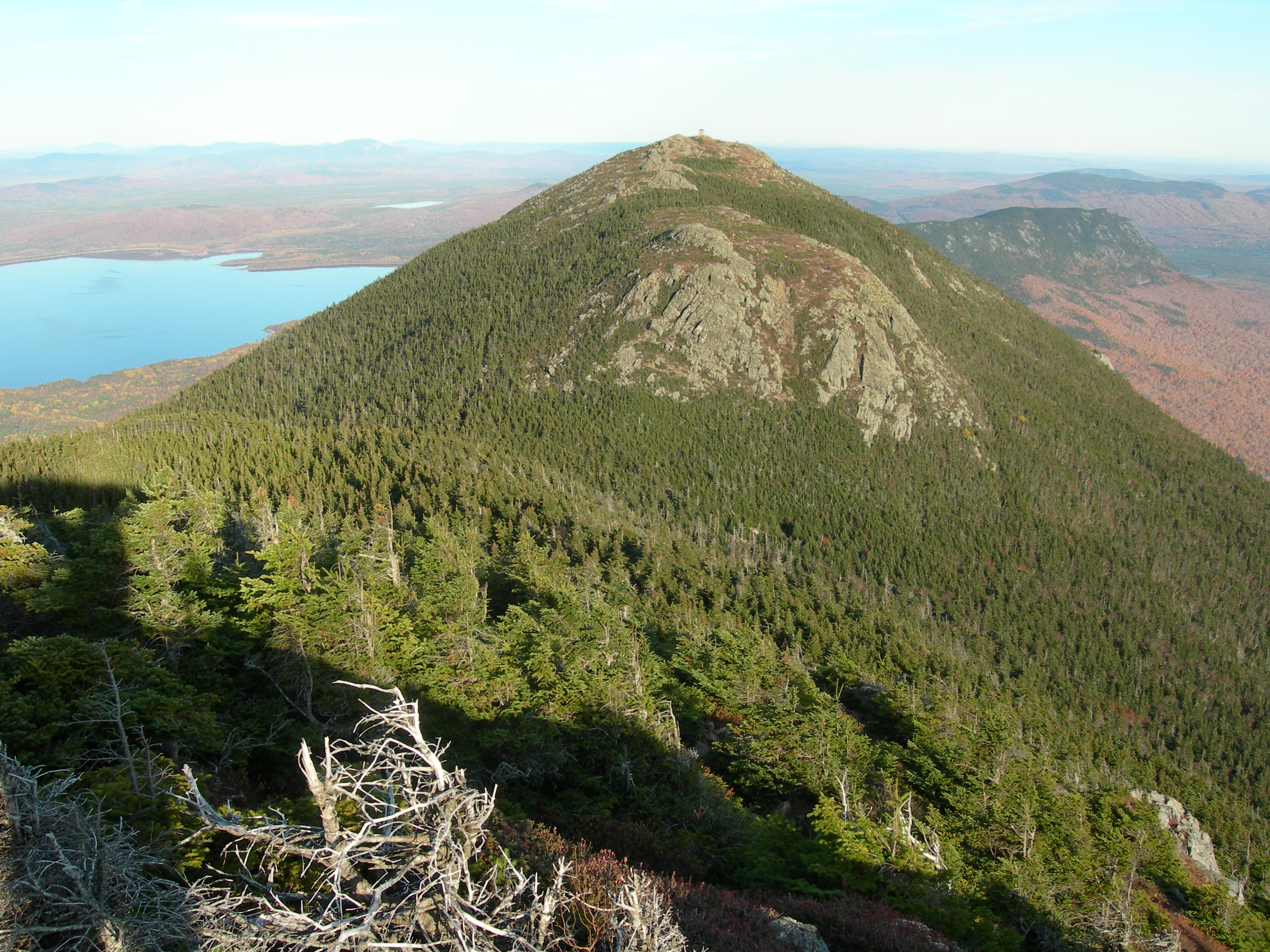
- Avery Peak on Mount Bigelow

- Location within Maine
- Location: Maine, United States
- Nearest city: Skowhegan, Maine
- Coordinates: 45°09′N 70°18′W
- Area: 36,000 acres (15,000 ha)
- Established: 1976
- Governing body: Maine Department of Agriculture, Conservation and Forestry
- Website: Official website

Bigelow Mountain Preserve is a 36,000 acres (15,000 ha) state-owned nature preserve in the western part of the U.S. state of Maine. Located in the village of Stratton within Eustis, Franklin County, Maine, the preserve was created in 1976 in order to stop a proposed development of a ski resort in the area. It is home to Mount Bigelow, one of Maine's highest mountains at an elevation of 4,145 feet (1,263 m), and Flagstaff Lake.

The namesake of both Bigelow Preserve and Mount Bigelow is Major Timothy Bigelow, a Revolutionary War patriot who climbed Mount Bigelow in October of 1775 "for the purpose of observation".
