= Carrying Place =

Carrying Place can refer to:

- Carrying Place, Ontario, a community and National Historic Site in Canada
- Carrying Place and Carrying Place Town, townships in Northwest Somerset, Maine, USA
- Oneida Carrying Place, Rome, New York, USA
- Toronto Carrying-Place Trail
- Portage or carrying trail, place where watercraft or cargo are carried over land from one body of water to another
