= Askwith (disambiguation) =

Askwith is a village and civil parish in the Harrogate district of North Yorkshire, England.

Askwith may also refer to:

- Askwith (Maine), a ghost town in Piscataquis County, Maine, United States
- Askwith (surname)
