= Bigelow Monument =

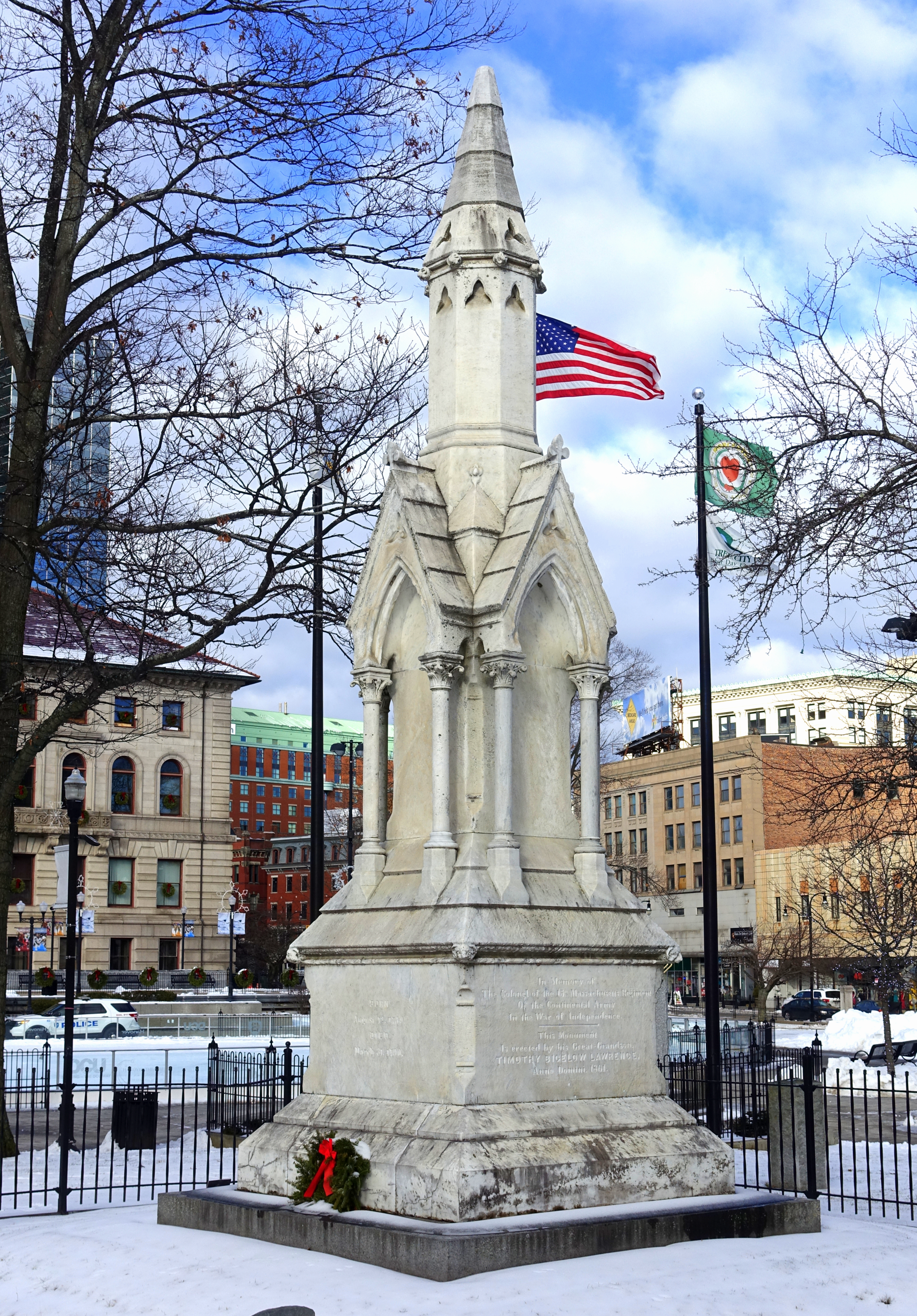
- Bigelow Monument (2020)
- Location: Worcester City Hall and Common, Worcester, Massachusetts, United States
- Coordinates: 42°15′44″N 71°48′2″W
- Designer: George Snell
- Builder: Granite Railway Company; Wentworth and Co.
- Material: Granite; Marble
- Length: 81 inches (2.1 m)
- Width: 81 inches (2.1 m)
- Height: 20 feet (6.1 m)
- Dedicated date: April 19, 1861
- Dedicated to: Timothy Bigelow

The Bigelow Monument is a public monument in Worcester, Massachusetts, United States. The monument, located in a small cemetery at the center of Worcester Common, honors Timothy Bigelow, a Patriot during the American Revolutionary War. The monument was dedicated on April 19, 1861, the 86th anniversary of the start of the war.

== History ==
=== Background ===
Timothy Bigelow was born in Worcester County, Massachusetts, on August 12, 1739. As an adult, he worked as a blacksmith and owned a shop in Worcester. During the American Revolution, he was a Patriot, and He served as a colonel during the American Revolutionary War. He commanded the 15th Massachusetts Regiment and is notable for leading minutemen from Worcester during the Battles of Lexington and Concord, the first military engagement of the war. He was also involved in the Saratoga campaign and Valley Forge. Following the war, he commanded the Springfield Arsenal before dying on March 31, 1790, at the age of 51.

=== Erection ===
On December 23, 1859, the city council of Worcester passed an act allowing Timothy Bigelow Lawrence (Bigelow's great grandson and son of Abbott Lawrence) to erect a monument to Timothy Bigelow on top of his burial place, located in Worcester Common. Worcester Mayor Alexander Bullock designated a 20 square feet (1.9 m^{2}) lot in the small cemetery in the commons for the monument. A committee was formed for the purposes of coordinating the monument's erection and dedication, and a group of prominent citizens organized to aid the committee, with former Massachusetts Governor Levi Lincoln Jr. as their chairman. In March 1861, the committee extended an invitation to Worcester native George Bancroft to give an oration at the monument's dedication, but he declined, citing his health. As part of the erection of the monument, Bigelow's body was exhumed and reinterred in a metallic casket. The monument itself was designed by George Snell, an architect from Boston. Two companies were involved in the construction of the monument, with the Granite Railway Company executing the granite portion of the monument and the marble, imported from Tuscany, was executed by Wentworth and Co. of Boston.

=== Dedication and later history ===
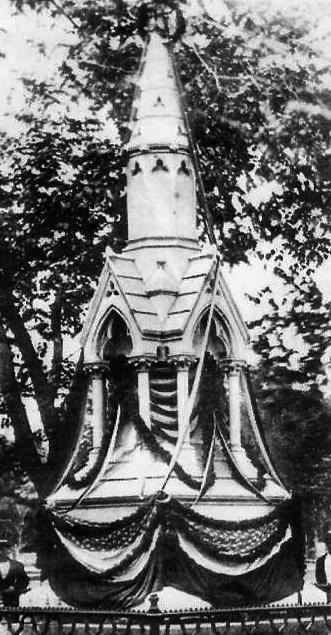
The monument at its dedication

The monument's dedication ceremony took place on April 19, 1861. On the Friday before the dedication (April 12) Mayor Isaac Davis and Governor Lincoln held a ceremony wherein multiple items were deposited within the monument, including multiple publications, a piece of wood from the Charter Oak, and a lock of hair belonging to Bigelow, among other items. The dedication ceremony, described in a 1914 book as one of the largest gatherings in the city, was attended by numerous descendants of Revolutionary War soldiers. The celebrations included a song, written by Clark Jillson, performed by a local glee club, followed by speeches given by several notable individuals. Among these included Lawrence, Mayor Davis, Governor Lincoln, Benjamin Thomas (grandson of Bigelow's contemporary Isaiah Thomas), and several members of the Bigelow family. While the dedication was taking place, members of the Massachusetts militia were involved in violent confrontations in the Baltimore riot of 1861, one of the first civil conflicts of the American Civil War. News of the violence would not reach Worcester until after the ceremony had concluded.

An 1889 history book on Worcester County lists the Bigelow Monument as one of only two memorials on Worcester Common, along with the Soldiers' Monument. Coincidentally, the Soldiers' Monument was accepted by Mayor Edward Livingston Davis, son of the mayor who had accepted the Bigelow Monument. In 1994, the monument was assessed as part of the Save Outdoor Sculpture! project. On Mother's Day in 2009, a military drill and wreath laying ceremony was held at the monument, with historian and author Ray Raphael presenting.

== Design ==
The plot of land the monument occupies is surrounded by an iron fence, with the monument itself resting on a square granite platform with sides of 9 feet (2.7 m). The square base of the monument has sides measuring approximately 81 inches (2.1 m). A time capsule is buried underneath the monument that contains documents regarding Bigelow and life in the colonial era. The architectural style of the monument, which is built primarily of Italian marble, is English Gothic. The monument's pedestal is four-sided, with carvings of ram's heads on each angle, with the following inscriptions on each face of the pedestal:

TIMOTHY BIGELOW

— Front face

Born
Aug. 12, 1739
Died
March 31, 1790

— Right face

Quebec
Monmouth
Saratoga
Verplanck's Point
Valley Forge
Yorktown

— Left face

In memory of
The Colonel of the 15th Massachusetts Regiment
Of the Continental Army
In the War of Independence,
This monument
Is erected by his great-grandson,
Timothy Bigelow Lawrence,
Anno Domini 1861.

— Rear face

Above the pedestal, the four sides of the monument features carved canopies, atop which the monument becomes octagonal. According to a commemorative program published shortly after the dedication, the monument was topped with a foliated cross, with the total height of the structure being 30 feet (9.1 m). However, the Smithsonian Institution Research Information System gives the original height of the monument as 25 feet (7.6 m). Additionally, they state that at some point, some of the stones on the upper portion of the monument were replaced with shorter stones, giving a present height of 20 feet (6.1 m).

== See also ==
- 1861 in art

== Bibliography ==
- Barnes, George (November 11, 2020). "Veterans Day: Worcester war memorials worth a visit". Telegram & Gazette. Gannett. Archived from the original on January 10, 2021.
- Ceremonies at the Dedication of the Bigelow Monument, Worcester, Massachusetts, April 19, 1861. John Wilson and Son. 1861 – via Google Books.
- Hurd, Duane Hamilton (1889). History of Worcester County, Massachusetts, With Biographical Sketches of Many of Its Pioneers and Prominent Men. Vol. I. J.W. Lewis & Company – via Google Books.
- Illustrated Business Guide of the City of Worcester. Snow, Woodman & Company. 1880 – via Google Books.
- Loring, James Spear (1855). The Hundred Boston Orators Appointed by the Municipal Authorities and Other Public Bodies from 1770 to 1852: Comprising Historical Gleanings, Illustrating the Principles and Progress of Our Republican Institutions (4th ed.). John P. Jewett – via Google Books.
- Sierra, Sarah E. (May 10, 2009). "Post holds Mother's Day breakfast". Telegram & Gazette. Gannett. Archived from the original on January 26, 2021.
- "Timothy Bigelow Memorial, (sculpture)". Smithsonian Institution Research Information System. Archived from the original on May 21, 2021.
- Tulloch, Donald (1914). Worcester, City of Prosperity: Sixteenth Annual Convention National Metal Trades Association. Commonwealth Press – via Google Books.
