= Upper Dallas School =

- U.S. National Register of Historic Places
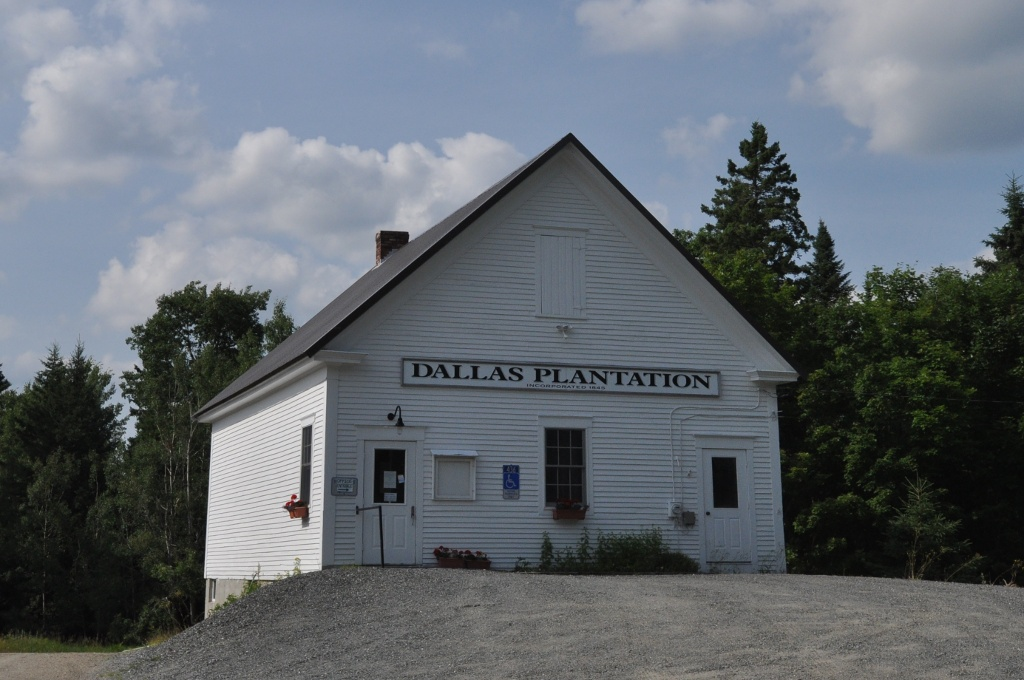

- Location within Maine Location within the United States
- Location: Dallas Mountain Rd., Dallas Plantation, Maine
- Coordinates: 44°57′55″N 70°36′8″W
- Area: less than one acre
- Built: 1888
- Architectural style: Late Victorian
- NRHP reference No.: 89002345
- Added to NRHP: February 9, 1990

The Upper Dallas School is a historic former school building in, and the present town hall for, Dallas Plantation, Maine. Located on Dallas Mountain Road, it is the best-preserved of two surviving district schoolhouses built by the small community, and has apparently served as town hall since its construction (whose date is a subject of uncertainty). The building was listed on the National Register of Historic Places in 1990.

== Description and history ==
The Upper Dallas School is set on the north side of Dallas Mountain Road, adjacent to a large public works building opposite its junction with Herrick Farm Road. It is a single-story wood frame structure, with a front-gable roof, clapboard siding, and a rubblestone foundation. The front facade is symmetrically arranged, with two widely spaced entrances and a central sash window, framed by simple trim with modest entablatures. The building has thin cornerboards, and the front-facing gable has cornice with simple returns. A small ell extends the building to the rear. The west elevation has a single window, while the east side has eight. The interior features a pair of narrow vestibules opening into a large chamber, which has a raised platform (presumably for a teacher's desk) in the space between the vestibules. The vestibules and main chamber both feature pressed tin ceilings. The ell houses a storage space for town records, and for pit toilets at the rear.

Town records are sketchy as to when this particular building was built. Dallas Plantation was organized in 1845, and an 1861 map shows a school building standing at or near this site. However, the parcel of land on which this building stands was purchased by the town in 1888, and the building is stylistically of a later 19th-century period. The town also built a second school in 1895 (known as the "Lower Dallas School"), which has been converted into a residence. The exact period for which it was used as a school is unknown; local lore maintains that it has been used continuously since its construction for town meetings (notwithstanding a 1939 WPA history claiming its use for that purpose ended in 1929). It is one of the small community's only surviving 19th-century buildings.

== See also ==
- National Register of Historic Places listings in Franklin County, Maine
