= Riceville, Maine =

Ghost town in Maine

Coordinates: 45.052528°N 68.307752°W

Riceville (also known as Hancock Tannery, Thirty-Nine Tannery, #39 Tannery, Riceville Plantation) is a ghost town in East Hancock, Maine specifically in Township 39 Middle Division. It was once home to a bark extract works owned by F. Shaw and Brothers Company, which owned many tanneries in the state of Maine. Later, the extract works was bought by James Rice and transferred to his company, Buzzell and Rice Tanning, which converted the plant into a tannery and began manufacturing sole leather from buffalo hides for shoemaking out of the township. Eventually Buzzell and Rice transferred the land back to Rice as an individual and he formed a new company, Hancock Leather, after which he began manufacturing sole leather once again. The community which sprang up around the tannery was home to 136 residents in 1890, eventually declining to 75 residents in 1900. The Riceville school had an enrollment of 21 pupils in 1900. In 1905, the tannery burned down and the town was abandoned shortly after. A post office existed from 1898 to 1906. There was nobody living in the township in 1910 and 1920.

== See also ==
- List of ghost towns in Maine
