= Mount Bigelow (Maine) =

Mountain in Maine, United States

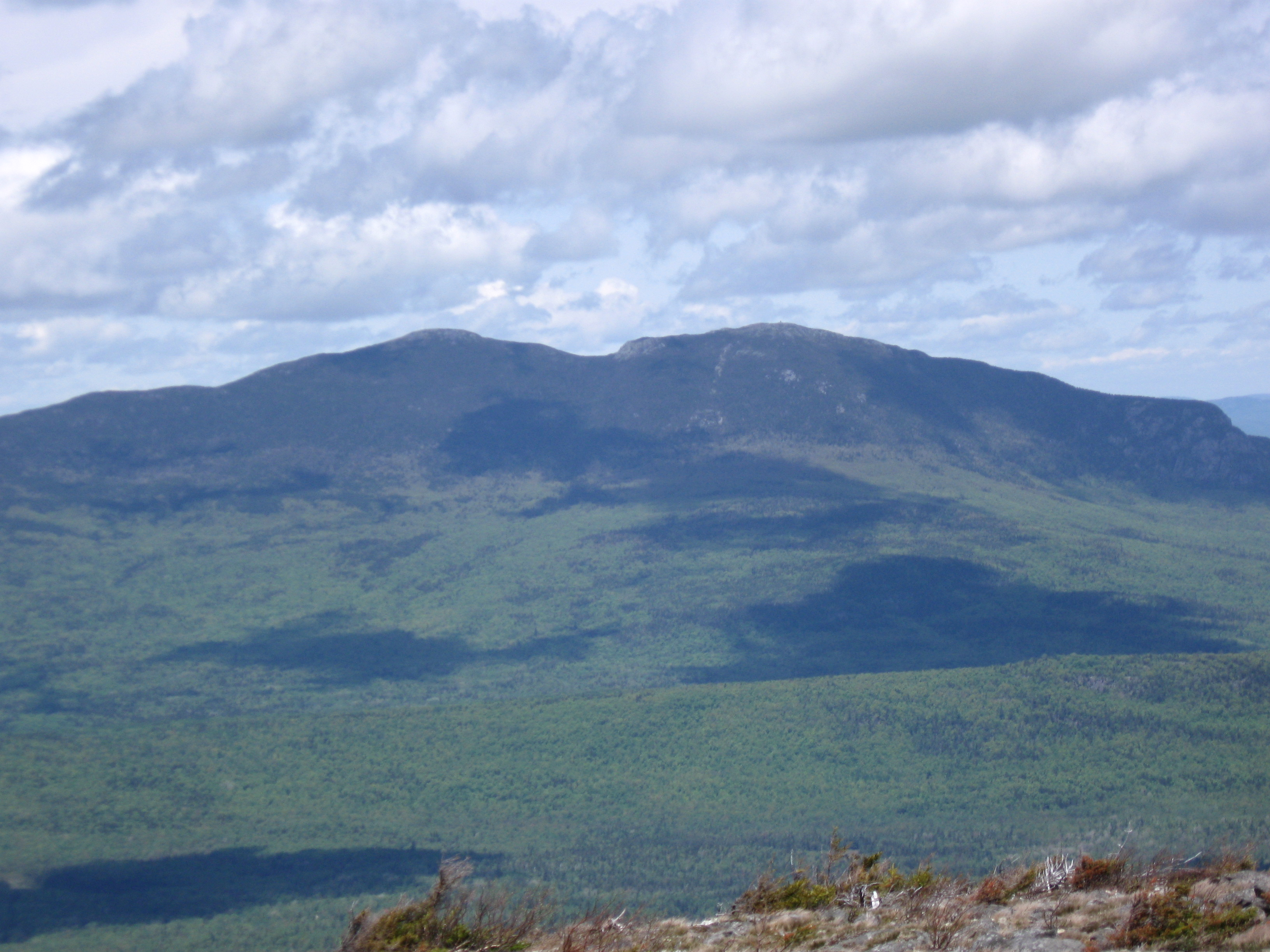
- Avery Peak (right), West Peak (left).

Highest point
- Elevation: 4,131 ft (1,259 m)
- Prominence: 2,845 ft (867 m)
- Parent peak: Crocker Mountain, Maine
- Listing: National Natural Landmark; New England 4000 footers; Maine County High Points #4; Maine County Prominence Peaks #3
- Coordinates: 45°8′48.53″N 70°17′16.60″W

Geography
- Location within Maine
- Location: Somerset County, Maine, U.S.; Franklin County, Maine, U.S.
- Parent range: Appalachian Mountains
- Topo map(s): USGS Stratton, The Horns

Climbing
- Easiest route: Hiking via the Appalachian Trail.

Mount Bigelow (also called the Bigelow Range and Bigelow Mountain) is a long mountain ridge with several summits. It is located in Franklin County and Somerset County, Maine. It is one of Maine's highest summits. The mountain is named after Major Timothy Bigelow who climbed the rugged summit in late October 1775 "for the purpose of observation." Major Bigelow was one of Colonel Benedict Arnold's four division commanders during the 1775 Invasion of Canada. The expeditionary force passed along the Dead River on the northern edge of the Bigelow Range, now dammed into Flagstaff Lake.

The highest summit of Bigelow Mountain is West Peak, at 4,145 ft (1,263 m). Subpeaks include Avery Peak (Myron H. Avery Peak) at 4,088 ft (1,246 m), The Horns at 3,805 ft (1,160 m), Cranberry Peak at 3,194 ft (974 m), and Little Bigelow Mountain at about 3,070 ft (940 m).

Bigelow Mountain is part of the Rangeley-Stratton mountain range, which also includes Sugarloaf Mountain, Crocker Mountain, Saddleback Mountain, Mount Abraham and Mount Redington.

The Appalachian Trail traverses Bigelow Mountain. Much of the mountain and surrounding area is part of the 10,540-acre (42.7 km^{2}) Bigelow Preserve, created in 1976 in response to a massive proposed ski resort. The Maine Appalachian Trail Club (MATC) maintains the trails on Bigelow Mountain and stations seasonal caretakers at the popular backcountry campsites at Horns Pond and Bigelow Col.

The Appalachian Mountain Club considers both the West Peak and Avery Peak of Bigelow to be "four-thousand footers" because Avery Peak rises more than 200 feet (61 m) in topographic prominence above the col that adjoins it to the higher West Peak. By this same criteria, the South Horn of Bigelow, while under 4,000 feet (1,200 m), qualifies for the New England Hundred Highest list.

In 1975, Bigelow Mountain was designated as a National Natural Landmark by the National Park Service.

== Climate ==
Climate data for Mount Bigelow 45.1477 N, 70.2837 W, Elevation: 3,501 ft (1,067 m) (1991–2020 normals)
Month	Jan	Feb	Mar	Apr	May	Jun	Jul	Aug	Sep	Oct	Nov	Dec	Year
Mean daily maximum °F (°C)	16.0 (−8.9)	18.2 (−7.7)	26.4 (−3.1)	42.9 (6.1)	55.8 (13.2)	64.5 (18.1)	69.5 (20.8)	68.5 (20.3)	62.2 (16.8)	49.1 (9.5)	32.5 (0.3)	21.1 (−6.1)	43.9 (6.6)
Daily mean °F (°C)	7.8 (−13.4)	9.7 (−12.4)	18.8 (−7.3)	33.2 (0.7)	46.6 (8.1)	55.8 (13.2)	60.6 (15.9)	59.3 (15.2)	52.3 (11.3)	39.2 (4.0)	26.3 (−3.2)	12.7 (−10.7)	35.2 (1.8)
Mean daily minimum °F (°C)	−0.4 (−18.0)	1.2 (−17.1)	11.2 (−11.6)	23.5 (−4.7)	37.5 (3.1)	47.1 (8.4)	51.8 (11.0)	50.1 (10.1)	42.3 (5.7)	29.2 (−1.6)	20.1 (−6.6)	4.2 (−15.4)	26.5 (−3.1)
Average precipitation inches (mm)	3.65 (93)	3.25 (83)	4.14 (105)	4.91 (125)	4.47 (114)	6.19 (157)	5.26 (134)	4.66 (118)	3.94 (100)	5.70 (145)	5.14 (131)	4.95 (126)	56.26 (1,431)
Source: PRISM Climate Group

== Gallery ==
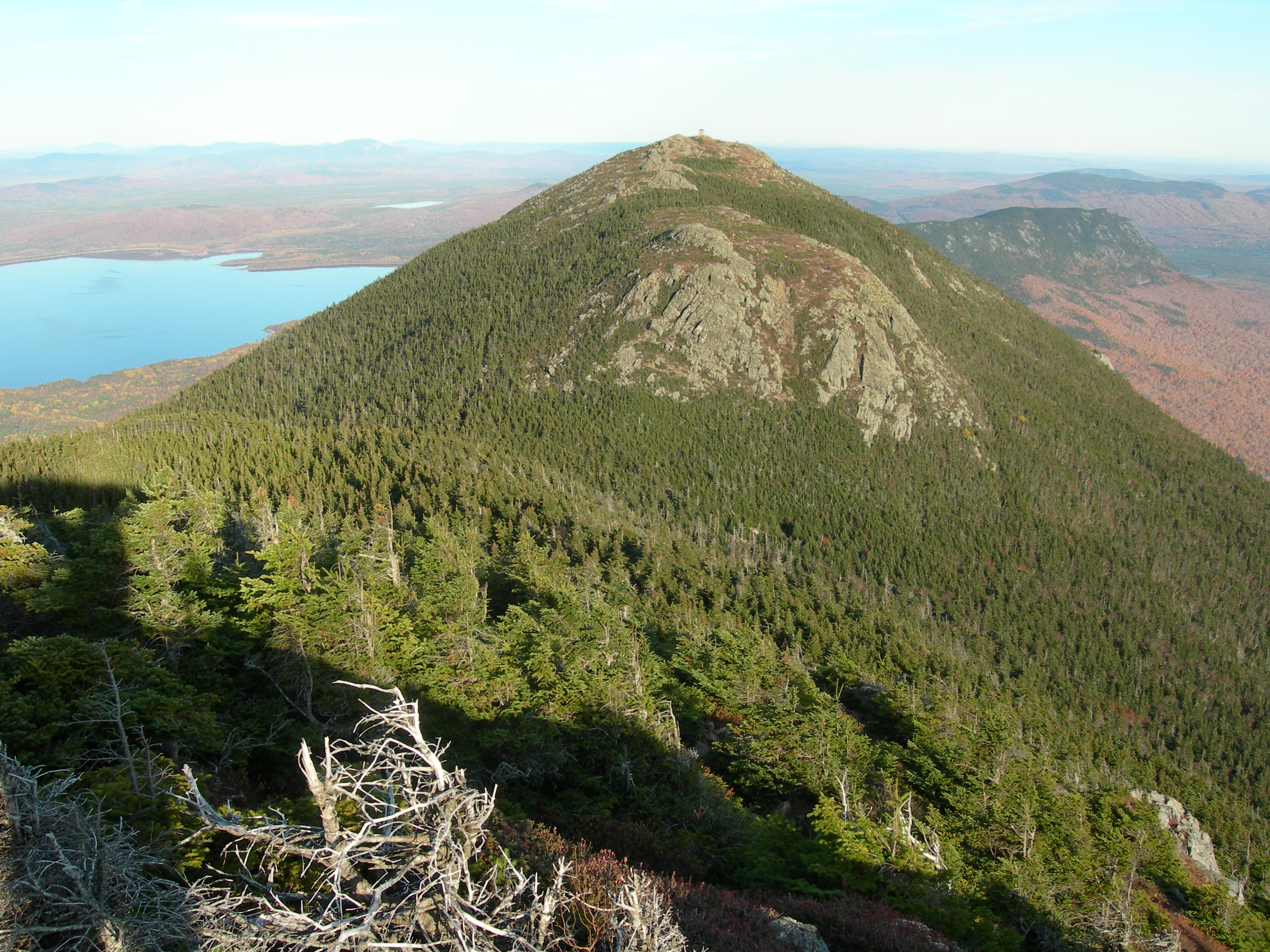
Mount Bigelow, Avery Peak

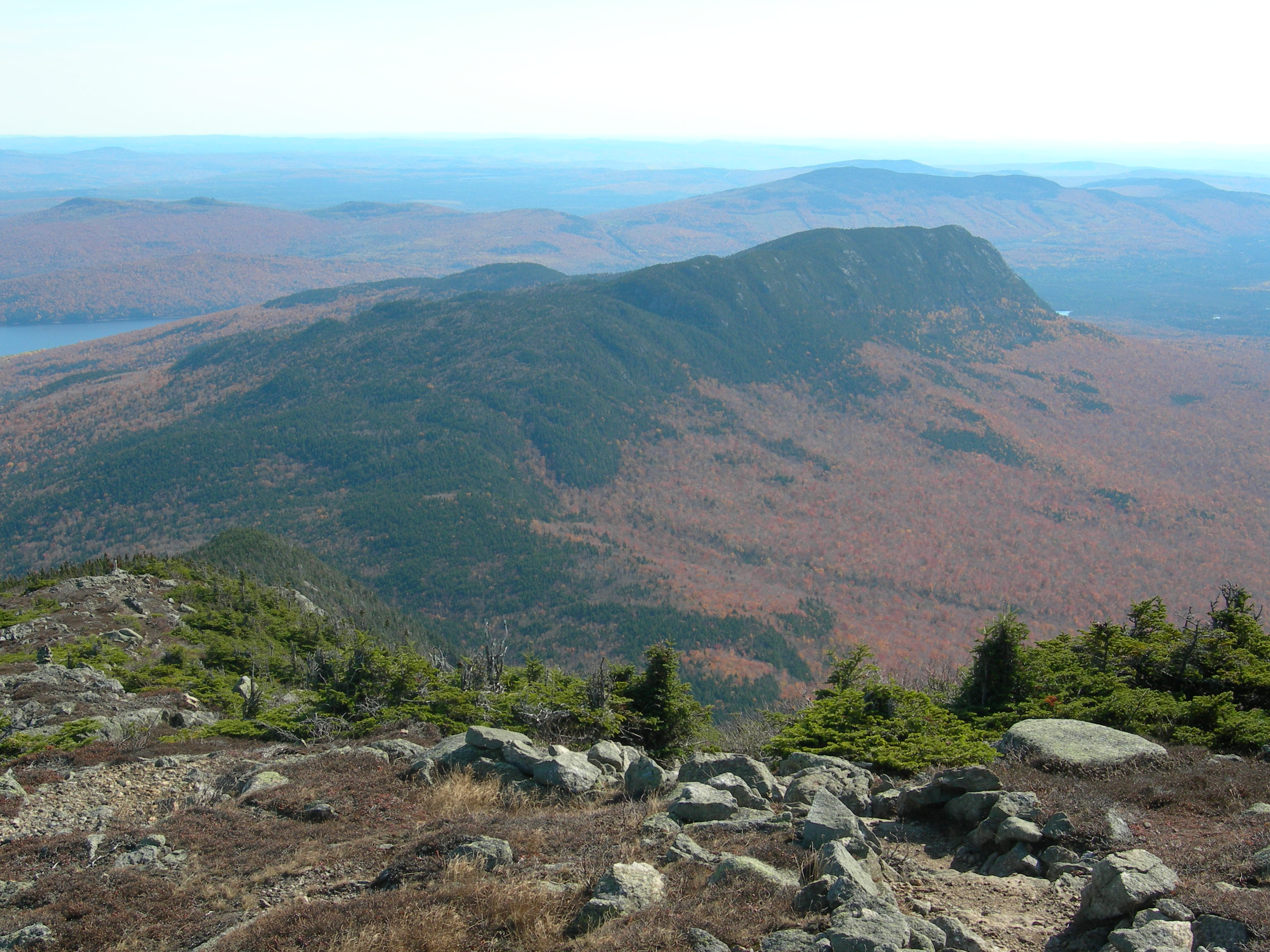
Little Bigelow Mountain

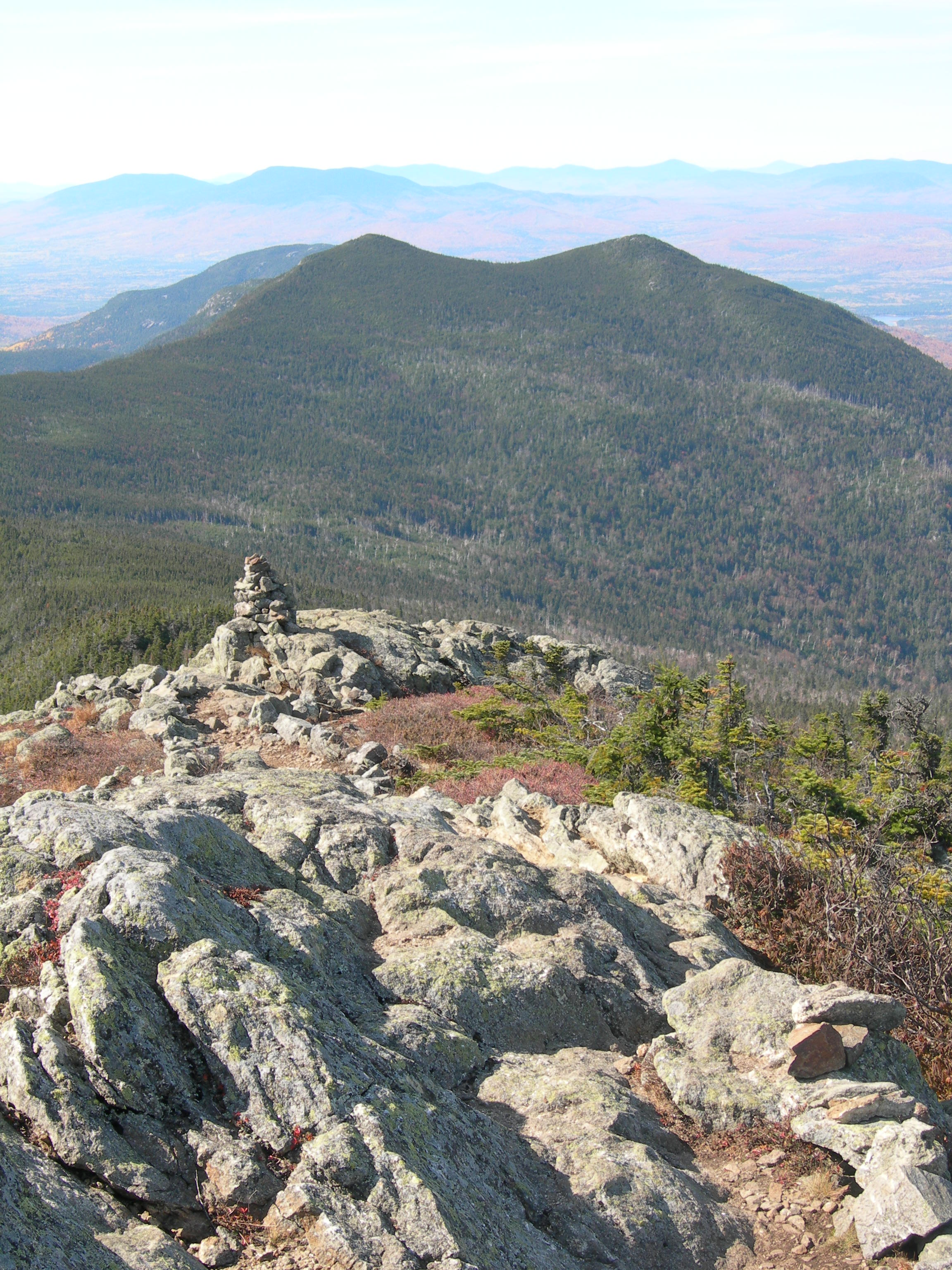
South Horn and North Horn

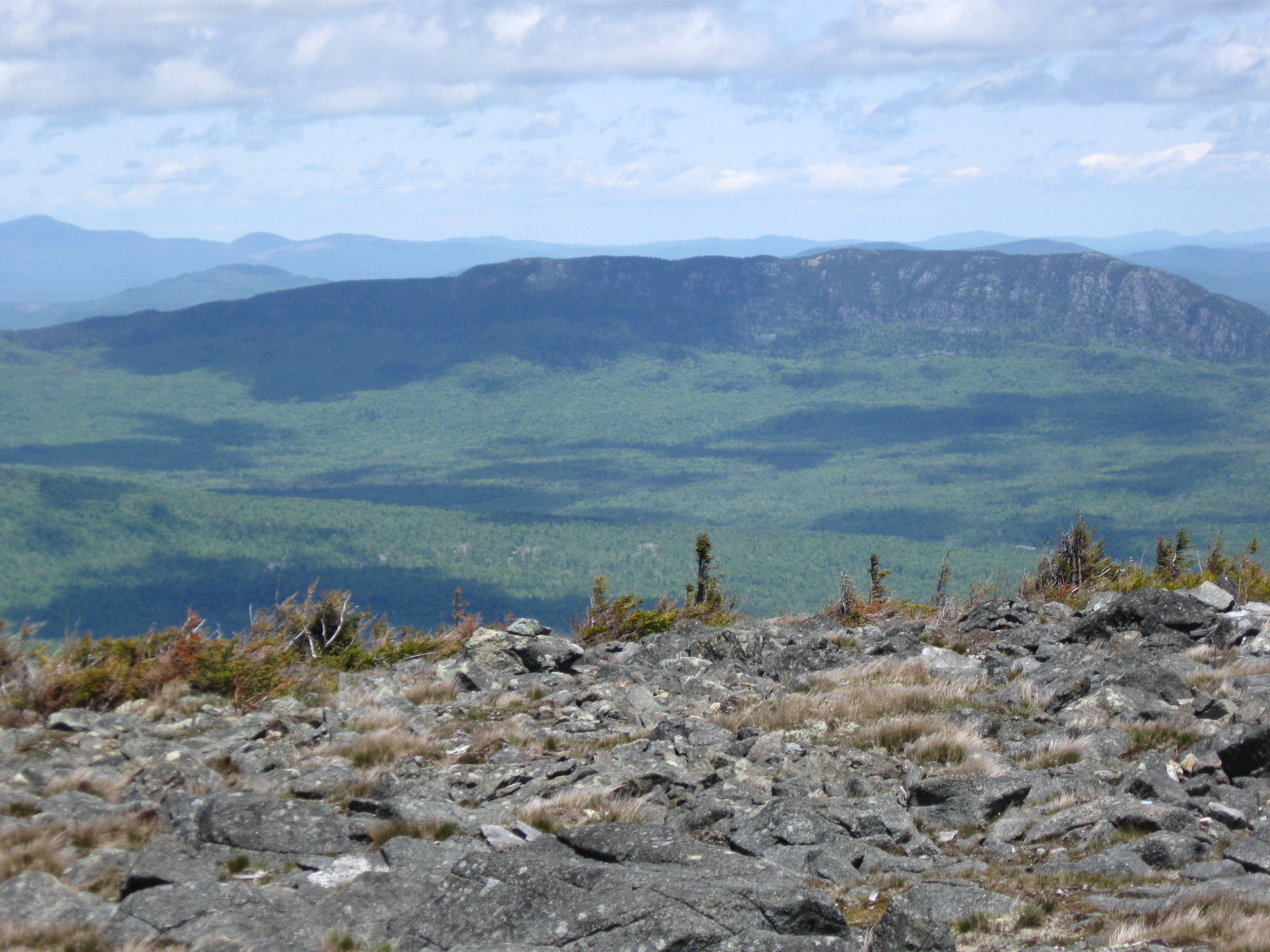
Little Bigelow Mountain as seen from the summit of Burnt Mountain.

== See also ==
- List of mountains in Maine
