= Timothy Bigelow (soldier) =

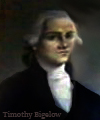
- Worcester's Revolutionary Patriot; Colonel Timothy Bigelow
- Born: August 12, 1739; Worcester, Massachusetts Bay Province, British America
- Died: March 31, 1790 (aged 50); Worcester County, Massachusetts, United States of America
- Burial place: Worcester Common Burial Ground, Worcester, Massachusetts; 42.26211°N 71.80068°W
- Monuments: Col. Timothy Bigelow's Memorial
- Occupations: American Revolution Regiment Commander; Blacksmith; Colonial America Patriot; Springfield Arsenal Superintendent
- Era: Colonial America
- Movement: Sons of Liberty
- Opponents: George II; George III
- Spouse: Anna Andrews Bigelow (1746–1809)
- Children: Nancy Bigelow Lincoln (1765–1839); Timothy Bigelow (1767–1821); Lucy Bigelow Lawrence (1774–1856)
- Parent: Daniel Bigelow (1697–1789)

Timothy Bigelow (August 12, 1739 in Worcester, Massachusetts, British America – March 31, 1790 in Worcester, Massachusetts, United States of America) fought as a patriot in the American Revolution.

== Biography ==
At the beginning of the American Revolution, he was working as a blacksmith at Worcester. He was a delegate to the Massachusetts Provincial Congress, participated in the Committee of Correspondence, fought in the Battles of Lexington and Concord, and served as colonel of the 15th Massachusetts Regiment of the Continental Army. He accompanied Benedict Arnold in his expedition to Quebec in 1775, and was captured there, remaining a prisoner until 1776. He was made colonel on February 8, 1777, and, when in command of the 15th Massachusetts Regiment, assisted at the capture of John Burgoyne. He was also at Valley Forge, West Point, Monmouth, and Yorktown. After the war, Bigelow had charge of the Springfield Arsenal. He was a benefactor of the academy at Leicester, Massachusetts.

== Family ==
He married Anna Andrews. They had six children together: Nancy Bigelow (born 1765, married Abraham Lincoln of Worcester), Timothy Bigelow (1767–1821; married Lucy Prescott, niece of William Prescott), Andrew Bigelow (born 1769; died unmarried), Rufus Bigelow (born 1772; died unmarried), Lucy Bigelow (born 1774; married Luther Lawrence), and Clara Bigelow (born 1781; married Tyler Bigelow). A grandson, George Tyler Bigelow, served on the Massachusetts Supreme Judicial Court.

== Memorials ==
Mount Bigelow (Maine) and (consequently) the Bigelow Preserve (Maine) are named after Timothy Bigelow. In 1861, Bigelow's grandson erected the Bigelow Monument in his memory in Worcester, Massachusetts. With others, Timothy Bigelow obtained a grant for 23,040 acres on October 21, 1780, on which was founded the town of Montpelier, Vermont, now the capital of Vermont. It was named by him.

Cultural Depictions of Timothy Bigelow
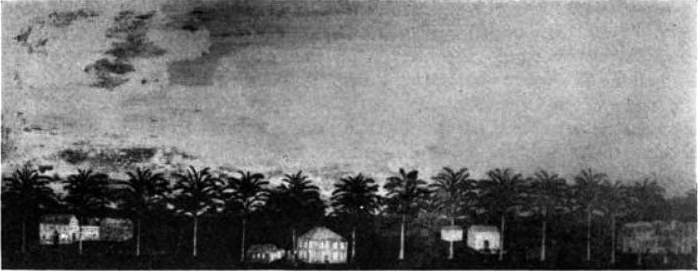
This painting of Col. Timothy Bigelow's house was discovered on a panel board above the fireplace in the parlor of the Theophilus Wheeler house when the paint was scraped off. It must have been depicted before the close of the Revolution as determined by the street-scape of the time.

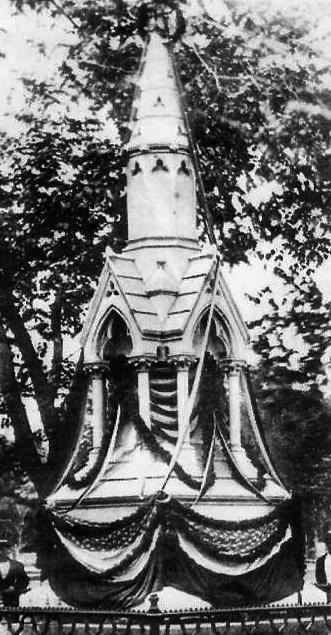
April 19, 1861 Dedication Ceremony of Col. Timothy Bigelow's Memorial on the Worcester Common; the very same common where he drilled his minutemen and prepared them for the American Revolutionary War.
