= Northeast Somerset, Maine =

- Unorganized territory
- Location within Maine Location within the United States
- Coordinates: 45°29′28″N 69°52′19″W
- Country: United States
- State: Maine
- County: Somerset

Area
  - Total: 521.0 sq mi (1,349.5 km^{2})
  - Land: 485.3 sq mi (1,256.9 km^{2})
  - Water: 35.8 sq mi (92.6 km^{2})
- Elevation: 1,063 ft (324 m)

Population (2020)
  - Total: 367
  - Density: 0.756/sq mi (0.292/km^{2})
- Time zone: UTC-5 (Eastern (EST))
  - Summer (DST): UTC-4 (EDT)
- ZIP Codes: 04920 (Bingham); 04942 (Harmony); 04945 (Jackman); 04478 (Rockwood)
- Area code: 207
- FIPS code: 23-51114
- GNIS feature ID: 582630

Northeast Somerset is an unorganized territory in Somerset County, Maine, United States. The population was 367 at the 2020 census.

== Geography ==
According to the United States Census Bureau, the unorganized territory has a total area of 1,349.5 km^{2} (521.0 sq mi), of which 1,256.9 km^{2} (485.3 sq mi) is land and 92.6 km^{2} (35.8 sq mi) (6.86%) is water.

== Townships ==
The territory consists of 17 whole townships plus six partial townships, of which four (Brassua, Soldiertown, Thorndike, and Tomhegan) are shared with Seboomook Lake and two (Johnson Mountain and Parlin Pond) are shared with Northwest Somerset. The whole townships are:

- Bald Mountain (T2 R3 BKP EKR)
- Chase Stream
- East Moxie
- Indian Stream
- Johnson Mountain
- Long Pond
- Mayfield
- Misery Gore
- Misery Township
- Moxie Gore
- Rockwood Strip (T1 R1)
- Rockwood Strip (T2 R2)
- Sandbar Tract
- Sandwich Academy Grant
- Sapling
- Squaretown
- Taunton & Raynham Academy Grant

== Demographics ==
Historical population
Census	Pop.	Note	%±
1980	301		—
1990	377		25.2%
2000	354		−6.1%
2010	390		10.2%
2020	367		−5.9%
U.S. Decennial Census

As of the census of 2000, there were 354 people, 165 households, and 99 families residing in the unorganized territory. The population density was 0.3 people/km^{2} (0.78 people/mi^{2}). There were 1,062 housing units at an average density of 0.8 units/km^{2} (2.1 units/mi^{2}). The racial makeup of the unorganized territory was 96.61% White, 2.82% Native American, and 0.56% from two or more races. Hispanic or Latino of any race were 0.28% of the population.

There were 165 households, out of which 23.6% had children under the age of 18 living with them, 52.1% were married couples living together, 4.2% had a female householder with no husband present, and 39.4% were non-families. 31.5% of all households were made up of individuals, and 12.1% had someone living alone who was 65 years of age or older. The average household size was 2.15 and the average family size was 2.64.

In the unorganized territory the population was spread out, with 21.5% under the age of 18, 2.3% from 18 to 24, 29.4% from 25 to 44, 33.1% from 45 to 64, and 13.8% who were 65 years of age or older. The median age was 44 years. For every 100 females, there were 119.9 males. For every 100 females age 18 and over, there were 109.0 males.

The median income for a household in the unorganized territory was $20,917, and the median income for a family was $31,250. Males had a median income of $26,806 versus $17,750 for females. The per capita income for the unorganized territory was $14,520. About 22.1% of families and 22.1% of the population were below the poverty line, including 22.7% of those under age 18 and 19.0% of those age 65 or over.

== Education ==
The Maine Department of Education takes responsibility for coordinating school assignments in the unorganized territory.
