= Greenbush, Maine =

Town in Maine, United States

- Town
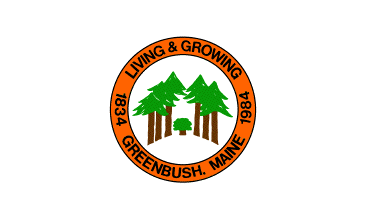
- Flag Logo
- Motto(s): "Living & Growing"
- Location within Maine Location within the United States
- Coordinates: 45°05′28″N 68°35′23″W
- Country: United States
- State: Maine
- County: Penobscot

Area
  - Total: 43.96 sq mi (113.86 km^{2})
  - Land: 43.80 sq mi (113.44 km^{2})
  - Water: 0.16 sq mi (0.41 km^{2})
- Elevation: 138 ft (42 m)

Population (2020)
  - Total: 1,444
  - Density: 33/sq mi (12.7/km^{2})
- Time zone: UTC-5 (Eastern (EST))
  - Summer (DST): UTC-4 (EDT)
- ZIP code: 04418
- Area code: 207
- FIPS code: 23-29185
- GNIS feature ID: 582499
- Website: townofgreenbushmaine.org

Greenbush is a town in Penobscot County, Maine, United States, on the Penobscot River. The town's population was 1,444 at the 2020 United States census.

== Geography ==
According to the United States Census Bureau, the town has a total area of 43.96 square miles (113.86 km^{2}), of which 43.80 square miles (113.44 km^{2}) is land and 0.16 square miles (0.41 km^{2}) is water.

== Demographics ==
Historical population
Census	Pop.	Note	%±
1840	261		—
1850	457		75.1%
1860	656		43.5%
1870	621		−5.3%
1880	681		9.7%
1890	659		−3.2%
1900	586		−11.1%
1910	485		−17.2%
1920	381		−21.4%
1930	373		−2.1%
1940	439		17.7%
1950	477		8.7%
1960	565		18.4%
1970	591		4.6%
1980	1,064		80.0%
1990	1,309		23.0%
2000	1,421		8.6%
2010	1,491		4.9%
2020	1,444		−3.2%
U.S. Decennial Census

=== 2010 census ===
As of the census of 2010, there were 1,491 people, 602 households, and 406 families living in the town. The population density was 34.0 inhabitants per square mile (13.1/km^{2}). There were 725 housing units at an average density of 16.6 per square mile (6.4/km^{2}). The ethnic makeup of the town was 94.2% White, 0.3% African American, 2.0% Native American, 0.3% Asian, and 3.3% from two or more races. Hispanic or Latinos of any race were 0.3% of the population.

There were 602 households, of which 33.6% had children under the age of 18 living with them, 53.3% were married couples living together, 8.5% had a female householder with no husband present, 5.6% had a male householder with no wife present, and 32.6% were non-families. 23.3% of all households were made up of individuals, and 5.5% had someone living alone who was 65 years of age or older. The average household size was 2.48 and the average family size was 2.88.

The median age in the town was 40.2 years. 23.1% of residents were under the age of 18; 8% were between the ages of 18 and 24; 27.1% were from 25 to 44; 32.8% were from 45 to 64; and 9% were 65 years of age or older. The gender makeup of the town was 49.6% male and 50.4% female.

=== 2000 census ===
As of the census of 2000, there were 1,421 people, 522 households, and 389 families living in the town. The population density was 32.5 inhabitants per square mile (12.5/km^{2}). There were 600 housing units at an average density of 13.7 per square mile (5.3/km^{2}). The ethnic makeup of the town was 96.48% White, 0.70% African American, 1.20% Native American, 0.07% Asian, 0.07% from other races, and 1.48% from two or more races. Hispanic or Latino of any race were 0.28% of the population.

There were 522 households, out of which 37.9% had children under the age of 18 living with them, 62.6% were married couples living together, 6.5% had a female householder with no husband present, and 25.3% were non-families. 17.0% of all households were made up of individuals, and 4.2% had someone living alone who was 65 years of age or older. The average household size was 2.72 and the average family size was 3.09.

In the town, the population was spread out, with 28.4% under the age of 18, 8.4% from 18 to 24, 33.9% from 25 to 44, 22.9% from 45 to 64, and 6.4% who were 65 years of age or older. The median age was 35 years. For every 100 females, there were 103.0 males. For every 100 females age 18 and over, there were 101.6 males.

The median income for a household in the town was $31,736, and the median income for a family was $35,962. Males had a median income of $32,095 versus $20,365 for females. The per capita income for the town was $13,592. About 9.7% of families and 13.5% of the population were below the poverty line, including 16.7% of those under age 18 and 17.7% of those age 65 or over.
