= Wrangler Lake =

Lake in Park County, Wyoming, United States

- Location within Wyoming Location within the United States
- Location: Yellowstone National Park, Park County, Wyoming, US
- Coordinates: 44°41′0″N 110°26′5″W
- Basin countries: United States
- Surface elevation: 7,850 feet (2,390 m)

Wrangler Lake is a lake located in Yellowstone National Park in the U.S. state of Wyoming. It is a few miles from the Wapiti Lake Trailhead.

== Description ==
The Yellowstone Fly-Fishing Guide describes the lake as fishless. There is a 10.2 mi (16.4 km) roundtrip trail which starts at Sour Creek in Yellowstone National Park and ends at Wrangler Lake.

Bill Schneider notes that Wrangler Lake has many mosquitos in June and July, and so recommends hiking later in the season.

== Externals links ==
- "Wrangler Lake". Yellowstone National Park.
