= Askwith, Maine =

Askwith
- Ghost town
- Interactive map of Askwith
- Location within Maine Location within the United States
- Coordinates: 45°36′58″N 69°50′20″W
- Country: United States
- State: Maine
- County: Piscataquis

Askwith is a ghost town located in Piscataquis County, Maine, United States. Between the towns of Greenville and Rockwood, specifically near Misery Knob, the town had at one time a post office. In 1895 there were no post offices, nor were there express offices; however there was a railroad. Askwith has since been renamed to Tarratine and discontinued as a railroad station. The railroad that once ran through it has been converted into an ATV trail.

== History ==
=== 1900-1920 ===
During the early 1900s, Tarratine was an important location for the Maine lumber industry. During that time the Hollingsworth & Whitney Company, the M. G. Shaw Lumber Company, and possibly others, operated in the town. In 1903, a forest fire originating from near Tarratine burned down between three and four hundred acres of forest.

In the spring of 1901, a 23-year-old woodsman named Mathison Pare was robbed and murdered in Askwith. Pare had last been seen the morning of March 11 walking to Askwith Station to take a train back to his parent's house in Canada. His body was found on April 14.

== See also ==
- List of ghost towns in Maine
