= North Franklin, Maine =

- Unorganized territory
- Location within Maine Location within the United States
- Coordinates: 45°18′28″N 70°39′40″W
- Country: United States
- State: Maine
- County: Franklin

Area
  - Total: 508.1 sq mi (1,315.9 km^{2})
  - Land: 499.3 sq mi (1,293.2 km^{2})
  - Water: 8.8 sq mi (22.7 km^{2})
- Elevation: 2,366 ft (721 m)

Population (2020)
  - Total: 41
  - Density: 0.082/sq mi (0.032/km^{2})
- Time zone: UTC−5 (Eastern (EST))
  - Summer (DST): UTC−4 (EDT)
- ZIP Codes: 04936 (Eustis); 04970 (Rangeley)
- Area code: 207
- FIPS code: 23-51400
- GNIS feature ID: 582632

North Franklin is an unorganized territory in Franklin County, Maine, United States. The population was 41 at the 2020 census. The territory consists of 13 townships and three gores, namely Lang, Davis, Tim Pond, Stetsontown, Jim Pond, Alder Stream, Seven Ponds, Kibby, Chain of Ponds, Massachusetts Gore, Coburn Gore, Skinner, Merrill Strip, Lowelltown, Gorham Gore, and Beattie.

== Geography ==
According to the United States Census Bureau, the unorganized territory has a total area of 508.1 square miles (1,315.9 km^{2}), of which 499.3 square miles (1,293.2 km^{2}) is land and 8.8 square miles (22.7 km^{2}) (1.72%) is water.

The territory includes all areas north and west of Eustis, Coplin Plantation, Dallas Plantation and the town of Rangeley. Most of this area has never been organized. The only exception is the former Lang Plantation, which surrendered its organization in 1935.

== Demographics ==
Historical population
Census	Pop.	Note	%±
1970	60		—
1980	28		−53.3%
1990	21		−25.0%
2000	41		95.2%
2010	61		48.8%
2020	41		−32.8%
U.S. Decennial Census

As of the census of 2000, there were 41 people, 17 households, and 12 families residing in the unorganized territory. The population density was 0.1 inhabitants per square mile (0.039/km^{2}). There were 281 housing units at an average density of 0.6 per square mile (0.23/km^{2}). The racial makeup of the unorganized territory was 92.68% White and 7.32% Black or African American.

There were 17 households, out of which 29.4% had children under the age of 18 living with them, 58.8% were married couples living together, 5.9% had a female householder with no husband present, and 29.4% were non-families. 29.4% of all households were made up of individuals, and 23.5% had someone living alone who was 65 years of age or older. The average household size was 2.41 and the average family size was 2.83.

In the unorganized territory the population was spread out, with 26.8% under the age of 18, 2.4% from 18 to 24, 29.3% from 25 to 44, 26.8% from 45 to 64, and 14.6% who were 65 years of age or older. The median age was 41 years. For every 100 females, there were 105.0 males. For every 100 females age 18 and over, there were 114.3 males.

The median income for a household in the unorganized territory was $26,250, and the median income for a family was $28,750. Males had a median income of $46,250 versus $0 for females. The per capita income for the unorganized territory was $15,670. There were 20.0% of families and 10.0% of the population living below the poverty line, including no under eighteens and none of those over 64.

== Education ==
The Maine Department of Education is responsible for school assignments in unorganized territories. As of 2025 it assigns "Coburn Gore" to the Stratton School (PreK-8 school of Eustis Public Schools) and Rangeley Lakes Regional School (PreK-12 school) in Rangeley.

== See also ==
- Coburn Gore–Woburn Border Crossing
