= 15th Massachusetts Regiment =

- Active: 1776-1781
- Allegiance: Continental Congress of the United States
- Type: Infantry
- Part of: Massachusetts Line
- Engagements: Battle of Saratoga, Battle of Monmouth, Battle of Rhode Island

Commanders
- Notable commanders: Colonel Timothy Bigelow

The 15th Massachusetts Regiment was raised on September 16, 1776, under Colonel Timothy Bigelow at Boston, Massachusetts, as part of Massachusetts contribution to the Resolve of 88 Regiments. The regiment would see action at the Battle of Saratoga, Battle of Monmouth and the Battle of Rhode Island. The regiment was disbanded on January 1, 1781, at West Point, New York.
