= Dallas Plantation, Maine =

- Plantation
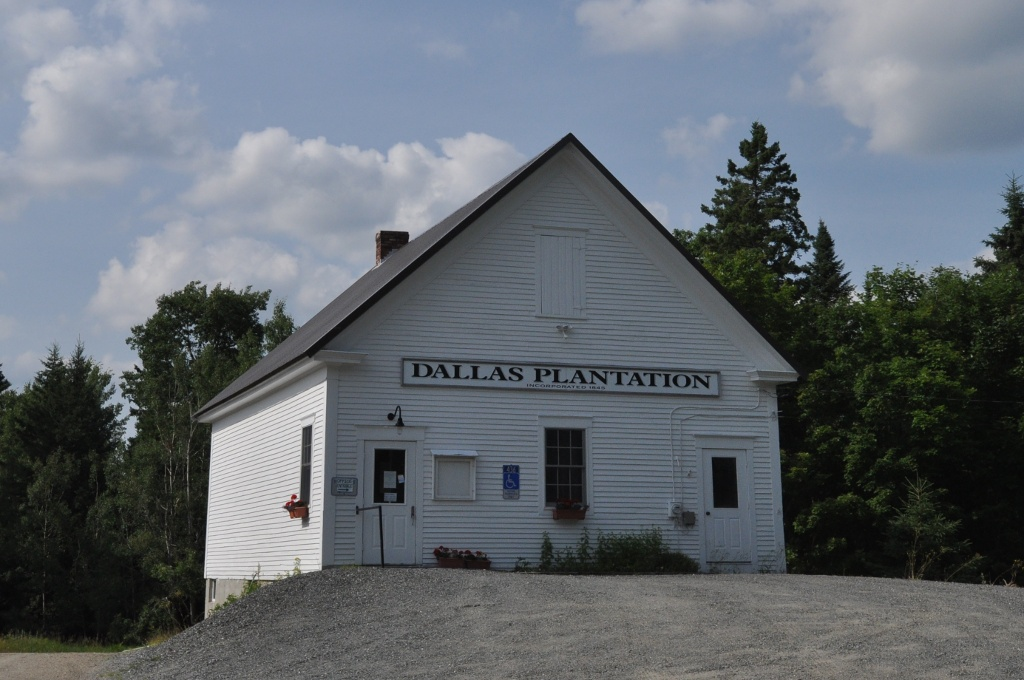
- The Upper Dallas School, which now houses the town offices

- Location within Maine Location within the United States
- Coordinates: 44°59′44″N 70°36′15″W
- Country: United States
- State: Maine
- County: Franklin

Area
  - Total: 41 sq mi (105 km^{2})
  - Land: 39 sq mi (101 km^{2})
  - Water: 1.4 sq mi (3.6 km^{2})
- Elevation: 1,732 ft (528 m)

Population (2020)
  - Total: 304
  - Density: 7.80/sq mi (3.01/km^{2})
- Time zone: UTC-5 (Eastern (EST))
  - Summer (DST): UTC-4 (EDT)
- ZIP code: 04970
- Area code: 207
- FIPS code: 23-16165
- GNIS feature ID: 582431
- Website: dallasplantation.com

Dallas Plantation is a plantation in Franklin County, Maine, United States. The population was 304 at the 2020 census.

== Geography ==
According to the United States Census Bureau, the plantation has a total area of 40.4 square miles (105 km^{2}), of which 39.0 square miles (101 km^{2}) is land and 1.4 square miles (3.6 km^{2}) (3.46%) is water.

== Demographics ==
Historical population
Census	Pop.	Note	%±
1870	159		—
1880	145		−8.8%
1890	184		26.9%
1900	172		−6.5%
1910	166		−3.5%
1920	365		119.9%
1930	211		−42.2%
1940	123		−41.7%
1950	81		−34.1%
1960	77		−4.9%
1970	105		36.4%
1980	146		39.0%
1990	161		10.3%
2000	250		55.3%
2010	309		23.6%
2020	304		−1.6%
U.S. Decennial Census

As of the census of 2000, there were 250 people, 110 households, and 77 families residing in the plantation. The population density was 6.4 inhabitants per square mile (2.5/km^{2}). There were 371 housing units at an average density of 9.5 per square mile (3.7/km^{2}). The racial makeup of the plantation was 98.40% White and 1.60% Native American.

There were 110 households, out of which 26.4% had children under the age of 18 living with them, 61.8% were married couples living together, 3.6% had a female householder with no husband present, and 29.1% were non-families. 20.0% of all households were made up of individuals, and 10.9% had someone living alone who was 65 years of age or older. The average household size was 2.27 and the average family size was 2.53.

In the plantation the population was spread out, with 18.8% under the age of 18, 7.6% from 18 to 24, 27.6% from 25 to 44, 31.6% from 45 to 64, and 14.4% who were 65 years of age or older. The median age was 42 years. For every 100 females, there were 98.4 males. For every 100 females age 18 and over, there were 105.1 males.

The median income for a household in the plantation was $36,875, and the median income for a family was $39,000. Males had a median income of $25,000 versus $17,813 for females. The per capita income for the plantation was $17,370. About 6.4% of families and 11.4% of the population were below the poverty line, including 13.5% of those under the age of eighteen and 3.8% of those 65 or over.
