= Northwest Somerset, Maine =

Unorganized territory in Maine, United States

- Unorganized territory
- Location within Maine Location within the United States
- Coordinates: 45°22′33″N 70°17′13″W
- Country: United States
- State: Maine
- County: Somerset

Area
  - Total: 708.6 sq mi (1,835.3 km^{2})
  - Land: 657.1 sq mi (1,701.9 km^{2})
  - Water: 51.5 sq mi (133.5 km^{2})
- Elevation: 1,289 ft (393 m)

Population (2020)
  - Total: 41
  - Density: 0.062/sq mi (0.024/km^{2})
- Time zone: UTC-5 (Eastern (EST))
  - Summer (DST): UTC-4 (EDT)
- ZIP Codes: 04945 (Jackman); 04961 (New Portland)
- Area code: 207
- FIPS code: 23-53636
- GNIS feature ID: 582641

Northwest Somerset is an unorganized territory in Somerset County, Maine, United States. The population was 41 at the 2020 census.

== Geography ==
According to the United States Census Bureau, the unorganized territory has a total area of 1,835.3 km^{2} (708.6 sq mi), of which 1,701.9 km^{2} (657.1 sq mi) is land and 133.5 km^{2} (51.5 sq mi) (7.27%) is water.

== Townships ==
The territory contains 20 townships plus parts of two townships shared with Northeast Somerset (Johnson Mountain and Parlin Pond):

- Appleton
- Attean
- Bigelow
- Bow Town
- Bradstreet
- Carrying Place
- Carrying Place Town
- Dead River
- Flagstaff
- Forsyth
- Haynestown (T5 R6)
- Hobbstown
- Holeb
- King and Bartlett
- Lower Enchanted
- Pierce Pond
- Rayton (T5 R7)
- Spencer (T3 R4)
- Spring Lake (T3 R5)
- Upper Enchanted

== Demographics ==
Historical population
Census	Pop.	Note	%±
1980	15		—
1990	8		−46.7%
2000	46		475.0%
2010	62		34.8%
2020	41		−33.9%
U.S. Decennial Census

As of the census of 2000, there were 46 people, 18 households, and 10 families residing in the unorganized territory. The population density was 0.0 people/km^{2} (0 people/mi^{2}). There were 452 housing units at an average density of 0.3 units/km^{2} (0.78 units/mi^{2}). The racial makeup of the unorganized territory was 89.13% White, 8.70% Native American and 2.17% Asian.

There were 18 households, out of which 27.8% had children under the age of 18 living with them, 50.0% were married couples living together, and 38.9% were non-families. 16.7% of all households were made up of individuals, and 5.6% had someone living alone who was 65 years of age or older. The average household size was 2.56 and the average family size was 3.00.

In the unorganized territory the population was spread out, with 23.9% under the age of 18, 6.5% from 18 to 24, 30.4% from 25 to 44, 32.6% from 45 to 64, and 6.5% who were 65 years of age or older. The median age was 42 years. For every 100 females, there were 155.6 males. For every 100 females age 18 and over, there were 133.3 males.

The median income for a household in the unorganized territory was $31,875, and the median income for a family was $35,000. Males had a median income of $26,250 versus $16,250 for females. The per capita income for the unorganized territory was $15,161. None of the population or the families were below the poverty line.

== Education ==
The Maine Department of Education takes responsibility for coordinating school assignments in the unorganized territory.
