= Eustis, Maine =

- Town
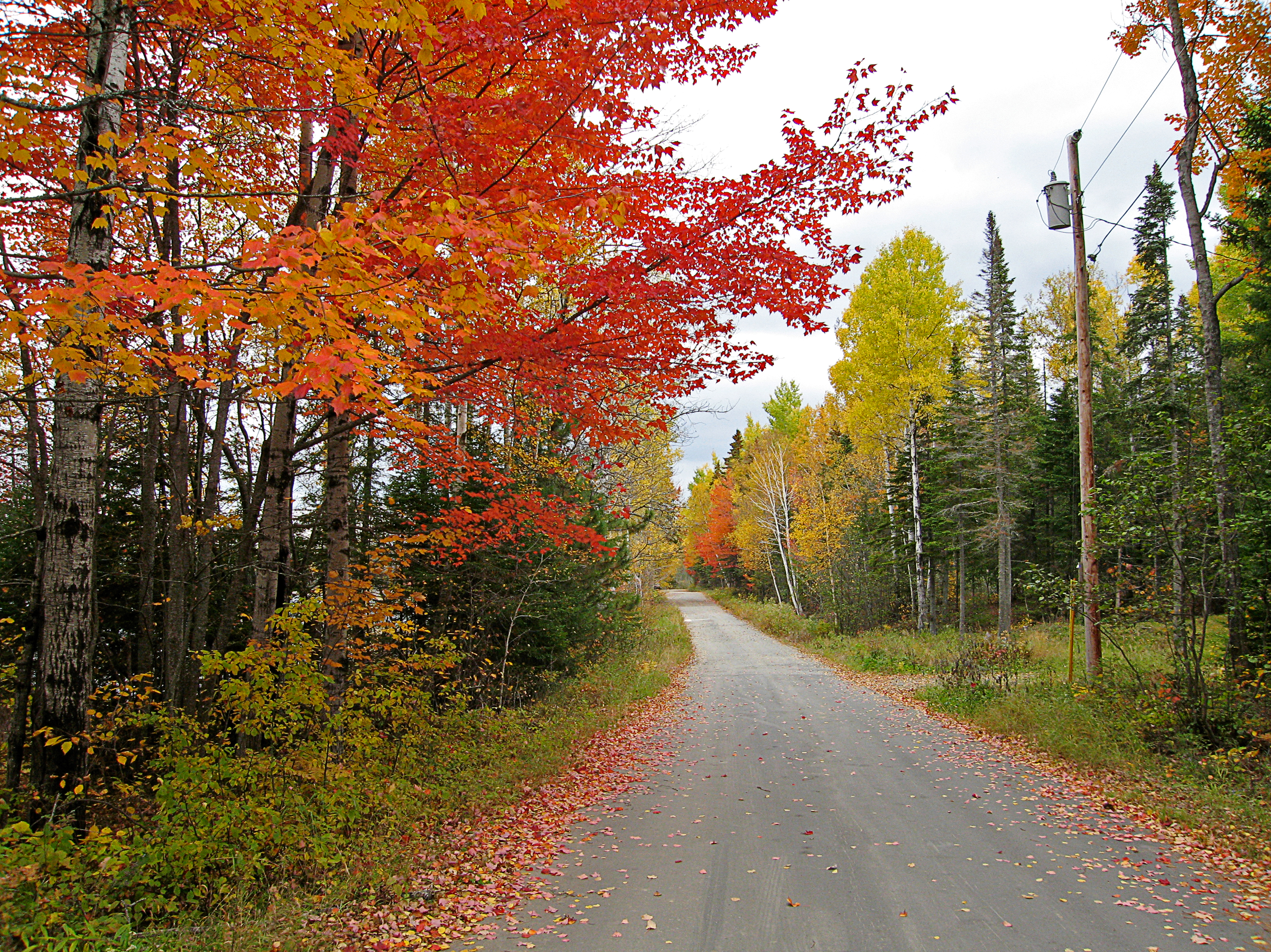
- Autumn in Stratton

- Seal

- Location within Maine Location within the United States
- Coordinates: 45°10′50″N 70°30′35″W
- Country: United States
- State: Maine
- County: Franklin
- Incorporated: 1871
- Villages: Eustis; Stratton

Government
  - Type: Mayor–council government

Area
  - Total: 41.48 sq mi (107.43 km^{2})
  - Land: 39.13 sq mi (101.35 km^{2})
  - Water: 2.35 sq mi (6.09 km^{2})
- Elevation: 1,437 ft (438 m)

Population (2020)
  - Total: 641
  - Density: 16/sq mi (6.3/km^{2})
- Time zone: UTC-5 (Eastern (EST))
  - Summer (DST): UTC-4 (EDT)
- ZIP Codes: 04936 (Eustis); 04982 (Stratton)
- Area code: 207
- FIPS code: 23-24005
- GNIS feature ID: 582469
- Website: eustismaine.org

Eustis is a town in Franklin County, Maine, United States. The population was 641 at the 2020 census. Eustis, which includes the village of Stratton, is a popular recreation area.

== History ==
Benedict Arnold and his troops passed through the area on October 19, 1775, on their way up the North Branch of the Dead River to fight in the ill-fated Battle of Quebec.

Eustis was first called Township No. 1 of Range 4, West of Bingham's Kennebec Purchase. The original settler was Caleb Stevens from New Hampshire, who brought his wife and nine children. About 1831, the northern half of the township was purchased from the state of Maine by two men, one of whom was Charles L. Eustis of Lewiston. That same year he built a sawmill and gristmill. In 1840, the township was organized as Hanover Plantation, which about 1850 became part of the larger Jackson Plantation. On March 30, 1857, however, the township was set off and organized as Eustis Plantation, named after its early proprietor. Then on February 18, 1871, with a population of 342, it was officially incorporated as a town.

== Geography ==
According to the United States Census Bureau, the town has a total area of 41.48 square miles (107.43 km^{2}), of which 39.13 square miles (101.35 km^{2}) is land and 2.35 square miles (6.09 km^{2}) is water. Eustis is drained by the Dead River.

=== Climate ===
This climatic region is typified by large seasonal temperature differences, with warm to hot (and often humid) summers and cold (sometimes severely cold) winters. According to the Köppen Climate Classification system, Eustis has a humid continental climate, abbreviated "Dfb" on climate maps.

Climate data for Eustis, Maine, 1991–2020 normals, extremes 1942–2018: 1260ft (384m)
Month	Jan	Feb	Mar	Apr	May	Jun	Jul	Aug	Sep	Oct	Nov	Dec	Year
Record high °F (°C)	60 (16)	70 (21)	84 (29)	92 (33)	94 (34)	103 (39)	100 (38)	104 (40)	100 (38)	90 (32)	78 (26)	63 (17)	104 (40)
Mean maximum °F (°C)	44.1 (6.7)	44.5 (6.9)	55.6 (13.1)	70.6 (21.4)	81.0 (27.2)	86.4 (30.2)	87.1 (30.6)	85.7 (29.8)	80.9 (27.2)	71.0 (21.7)	60.4 (15.8)	47.8 (8.8)	90.1 (32.3)
Mean daily maximum °F (°C)	21.9 (−5.6)	24.8 (−4.0)	33.7 (0.9)	46.9 (8.3)	61.7 (16.5)	70.7 (21.5)	75.8 (24.3)	74.4 (23.6)	66.6 (19.2)	52.4 (11.3)	39.3 (4.1)	27.9 (−2.3)	49.7 (9.8)
Daily mean °F (°C)	12.0 (−11.1)	13.9 (−10.1)	23.2 (−4.9)	36.5 (2.5)	49.5 (9.7)	59.2 (15.1)	64.2 (17.9)	62.3 (16.8)	54.5 (12.5)	42.7 (5.9)	31.2 (−0.4)	19.5 (−6.9)	39.1 (3.9)
Mean daily minimum °F (°C)	2.1 (−16.6)	3.0 (−16.1)	12.6 (−10.8)	26.2 (−3.2)	37.3 (2.9)	47.8 (8.8)	52.6 (11.4)	50.3 (10.2)	42.3 (5.7)	32.9 (0.5)	23.0 (−5.0)	11.0 (−11.7)	28.4 (−2.0)
Mean minimum °F (°C)	−20.9 (−29.4)	−18.5 (−28.1)	−10.6 (−23.7)	14.6 (−9.7)	25.7 (−3.5)	34.9 (1.6)	41.8 (5.4)	36.4 (2.4)	28.4 (−2.0)	20.1 (−6.6)	5.8 (−14.6)	−12.0 (−24.4)	−23.1 (−30.6)
Record low °F (°C)	−34 (−37)	−36 (−38)	−23 (−31)	−2 (−19)	20 (−7)	22 (−6)	34 (1)	31 (−1)	18 (−8)	14 (−10)	−12 (−24)	−25 (−32)	−36 (−38)
Average precipitation inches (mm)	2.55 (65)	2.43 (62)	2.77 (70)	3.36 (85)	3.76 (96)	4.78 (121)	4.04 (103)	3.53 (90)	3.37 (86)	4.30 (109)	3.41 (87)	3.38 (86)	41.68 (1,060)
Average snowfall inches (cm)	22.1 (56)	26.8 (68)	24.1 (61)	8.2 (21)	0.1 (0.25)	0.0 (0.0)	0.0 (0.0)	0.0 (0.0)	0.0 (0.0)	2.2 (5.6)	7.8 (20)	27.2 (69)	118.5 (300.85)
Average extreme snow depth inches (cm)	21.4 (54)	27.5 (70)	29.2 (74)	19.5 (50)	2.0 (5.1)	0.0 (0.0)	0.0 (0.0)	0.0 (0.0)	0.0 (0.0)	1.4 (3.6)	5.8 (15)	14.9 (38)	31.6 (80)
Average precipitation days (≥ 0.01 in)	11.1	9.2	11.0	12.0	13.0	14.0	13.0	12.1	10.2	12.9	12.8	14.0	145.3
Average snowy days (≥ 0.1 in)	10.0	8.6	8.3	3.8	0.2	0.0	0.0	0.0	0.0	1.2	5.5	11.8	49.4
Source 1: NOAA
Source 2: XMACIS2 (mean maxima/minima 1981–2010)

== Demographics ==
Historical population
Census	Pop.	Note	%±
1870	342		—
1880	302		−11.7%
1890	321		6.3%
1900	436		35.8%
1910	508		16.5%
1920	589		15.9%
1930	601		2.0%
1940	707		17.6%
1950	763		7.9%
1960	666		−12.7%
1970	595		−10.7%
1980	582		−2.2%
1990	616		5.8%
2000	685		11.2%
2010	618		−9.8%
2020	641		3.7%
U.S. Decennial Census

=== 2010 census ===
As of the census of 2010, there were 618 people, 313 households, and 179 families living in the town. The population density was 15.8 inhabitants per square mile (6.1/km^{2}). There were 822 housing units at an average density of 21.0 per square mile (8.1/km^{2}). The racial makeup of the town was 98.5% White, 0.2% African American, 0.6% Native American, 0.3% Asian, and 0.3% from two or more races. Hispanic or Latino of any race were 0.5% of the population.

There were 313 households, of which 19.2% had children under the age of 18 living with them, 47.3% were married couples living together, 5.8% had a female householder with no husband present, 4.2% had a male householder with no wife present, and 42.8% were non-families. 33.2% of all households were made up of individuals, and 13.1% had someone living alone who was 65 years of age or older. The average household size was 1.97 and the average family size was 2.47.

The median age in the town was 49.4 years. 14.2% of residents were under the age of 18; 6.4% were between the ages of 18 and 24; 18.6% were from 25 to 44; 37.3% were from 45 to 64; and 23.6% were 65 years of age or older. The gender makeup of the town was 52.8% male and 47.2% female.

=== 2000 census ===
As of the census of 2000, there were 685 people, 302 households, and 170 families living in the town. The population density was 17.5 inhabitants per square mile (6.8/km^{2}). There were 747 housing units at an average density of 19.1 per square mile (7.4/km^{2}). The racial makeup of the town was 95.47% White, 0.44% African American, 2.04% Native American, 0.15% Asian, and 1.90% from two or more races.

There were 302 households, out of which 26.2% had children under the age of 18 living with them, 44.4% were married couples living together, 8.6% had a female householder with no husband present, and 43.4% were non-families. 32.1% of all households were made up of individuals, and 11.3% had someone living alone who was 65 years of age or older. The average household size was 2.27 and the average family size was 2.90.

In the town, the population was spread out, with 24.4% under the age of 18, 7.6% from 18 to 24, 28.0% from 25 to 44, 26.6% from 45 to 64, and 13.4% who were 65 years of age or older. The median age was 40 years. For every 100 females there were 106.9 males. For every 100 females age 18 and over, there were 101.6 males.

The median income for a household in the town was $28,000, and the median income for a family was $35,000. Males had a median income of $27,614 versus $21,111 for females. The per capita income for the town was $13,274. About 7.7% of families and 14.3% of the population were below the poverty line, including 10.8% of those under age 18 and 9.4% of those age 65 or over.

== Sites of interest ==
- Bigelow Preserve
- Dead River Area Historical Society
- Flagstaff Lake
