= Flagstaff Lake (Maine) =

Reservoir in Maine, US

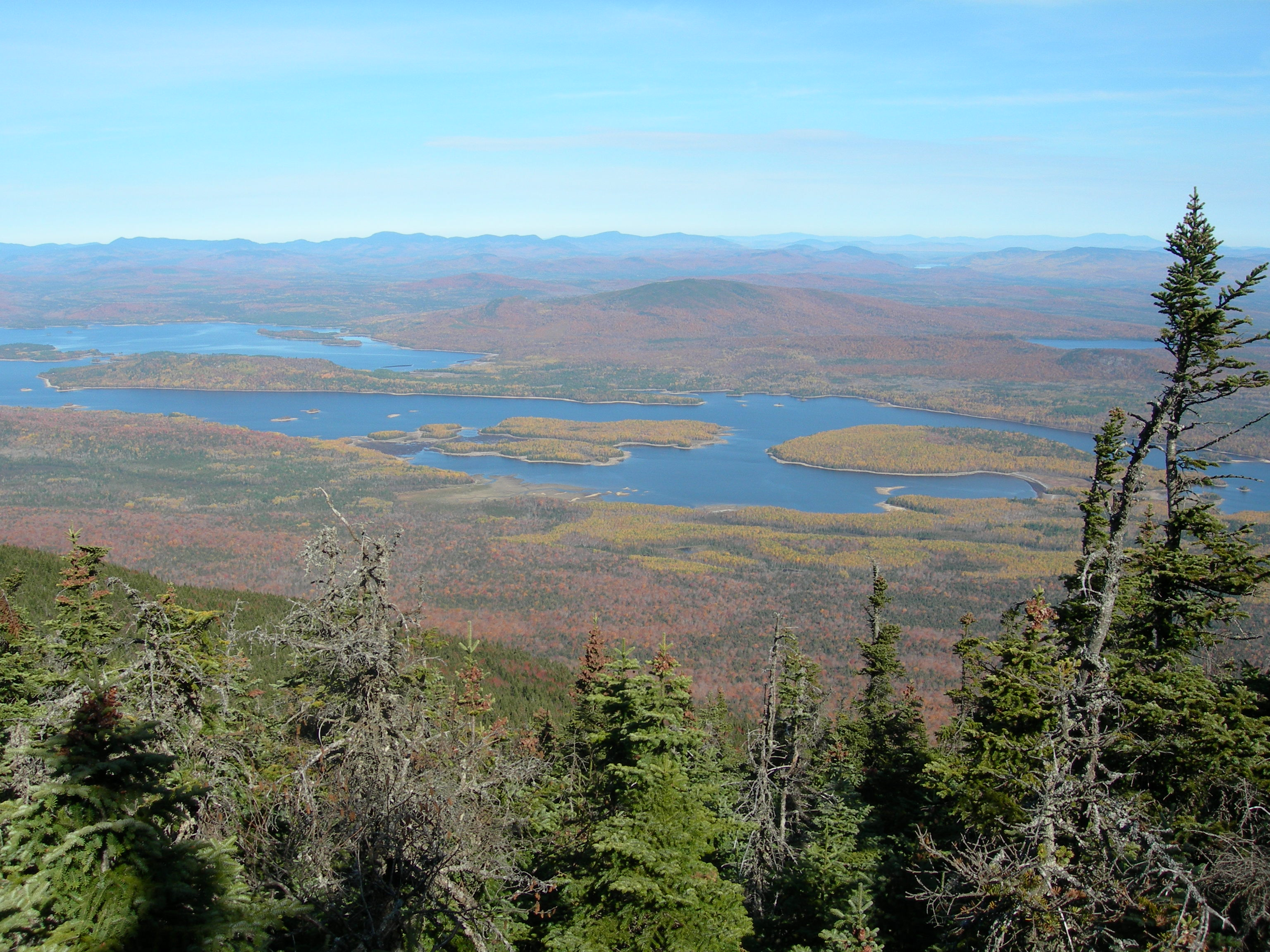
- Flagstaff Lake seen from Mount Bigelow

- Location within Maine Location within the United States
- Location: Northwest Somerset, Somerset County, and Eustis, Franklin County, Maine, US
- Coordinates: 45°11′38.9″N 70°18′52.4″W
- Type: eutrophic, reservoir, Man Made Lake, Its a flooded village, once known as Flagstaff Village.
- Primary inflows: North Branch Dead River; South Branch Dead River
- Primary outflows: Dead River
- Catchment area: 516 sq mi (1,340 km^{2})
- Basin countries: United States
- Surface area: 20,300 acres (8,200 ha)
- Average depth: 18 ft (5.5 m)
- Max. depth: 48 ft (15 m)
- Water volume: 261,365 acre⋅ft (322,389,000 m^{3})
- Residence time: 6 months
- Shore length^{1}: 147.2 mi (236.9 km)
- Surface elevation: 1,146 ft (349 m)
- ^{1} Shore length is not a well-defined measure.

Flagstaff Lake is located in Somerset County and Franklin County, Maine, in the United States. The North Branch Dead River and South Branch Dead River join in the lake, forming the Dead River.

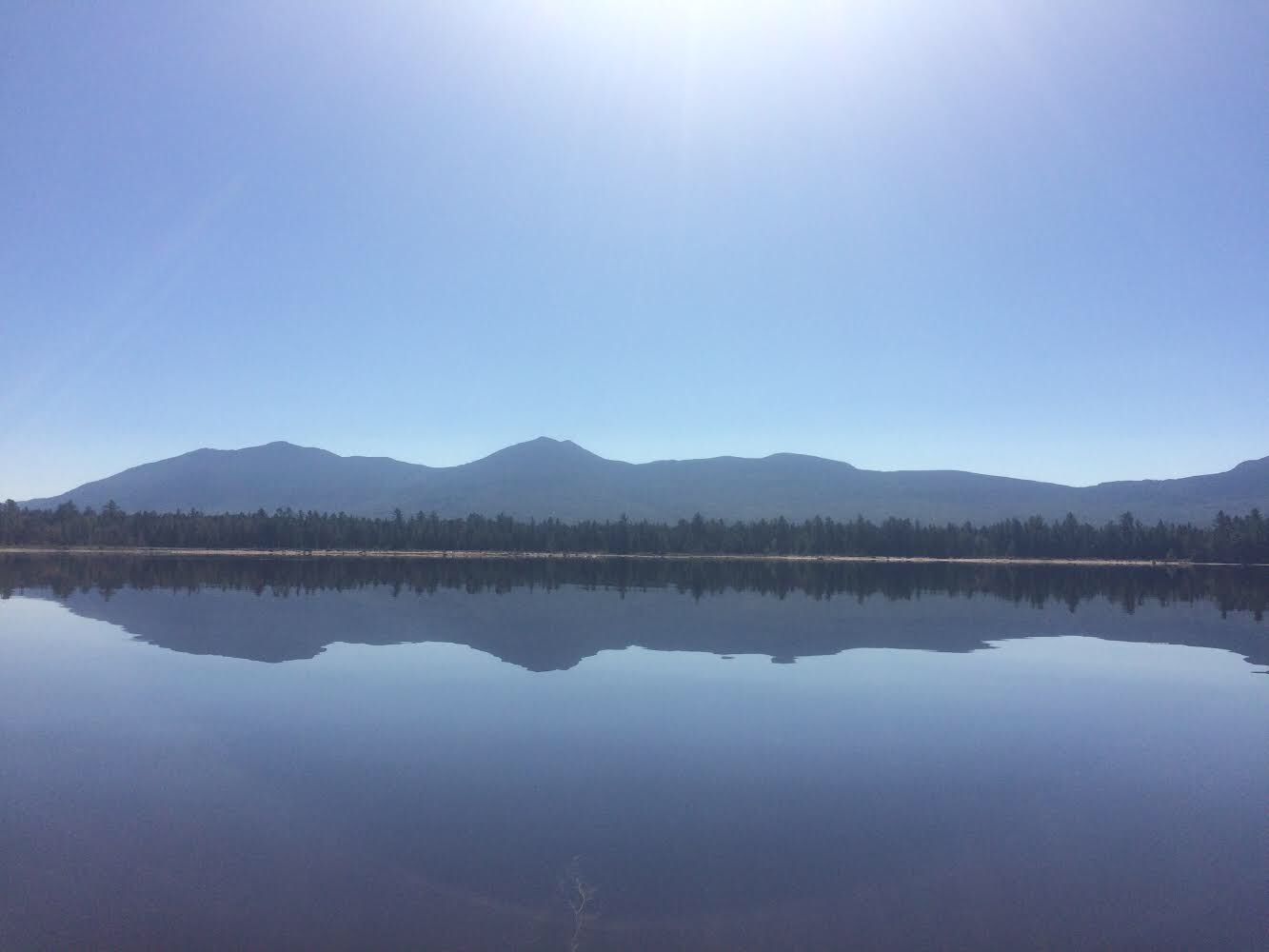
Flagstaff Lake in September 2018

The lake's surface area is 20,300 acres (82 km^{2}), and it has a storage capacity of about 275,482 acre-feet (339,802,000 m^{3}). It is extremely shallow (more so during drought years). Its deepest point is 48 feet (15 m). Landlocked salmon and brook trout can be caught. Some points on the lake are very marshy and have to be negotiated with a canoe or kayak; even then, wading may be necessary in the marshy areas to get through to the rest of the lake.

Bigelow Mountain Range overlooks from the lake's southern shore, which makes the lake popular for outdoor activities. The lake is mostly undeveloped with relatively few boats and is optimal for kayaking.

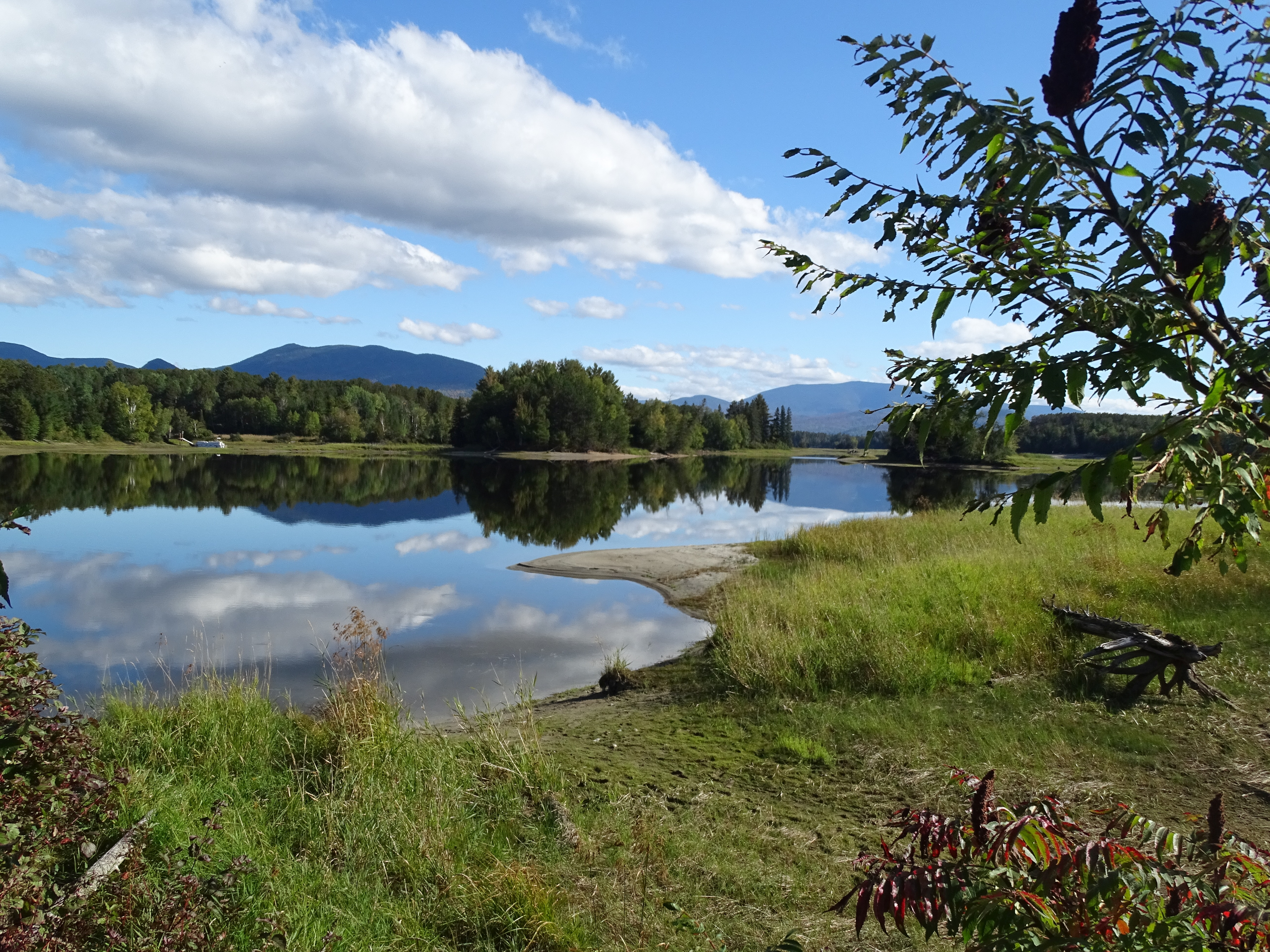
Flagstaff Lake and Bigelow Mountains viewed from Flagstaff Road, Eustis, Maine

== Long Falls Dam ==
Flagstaff Lake was a smaller natural lake when the Long Falls Dam impounded the Dead River in 1950, enlarging the lake and turning it into a reservoir used for hydropower electricity production by regulating the flow of the Dead River into the Kennebec River. At the time, the river drive was still a primary means of delivering timber to the pulp mills downstream. Improved highways and the trucking industry have replaced the river drive.

Construction was controversial dating back to 1923, pitting the president of Central Maine Power Company, Walter Wyman, against state legislator and future Maine governor Percival Proctor Baxter. Flagstaff Lake occupies parts of the abandoned and now submerged townships of Flagstaff, Bigelow, Dead River and Carrying Place.

The dam is 45 feet (14 m) high, 1,339 feet (408 m) long at its crest, and consists of a 450 feet (140 m) concrete spillway, a 125 foot (38 m) long concrete section containing five 20 feet (6.1 m) wide Tainter gates, a 70 foot (21 m) long concrete section containing two Broome gates, and a log sluice, and a 694 foot (212 m) long earthen dike. The dam is owned and operated by Brookfield Renewable Energy, but no electricity is generated here. The dam is operated to regulate and augment flows that are used by eight downstream mainstem Kennebec River hydropower projects, and to control flooding.

== Climate ==
Climate data for Long Falls Dam, Maine 1991–2020 normals, extremes 1951-2020: 1160ft (354m)
Month	Jan	Feb	Mar	Apr	May	Jun	Jul	Aug	Sep	Oct	Nov	Dec	Year
Record high °F (°C)	56 (13)	60 (16)	78 (26)	83 (28)	90 (32)	93 (34)	94 (34)	98 (37)	94 (34)	82 (28)	68 (20)	63 (17)	98 (37)
Mean maximum °F (°C)	45 (7)	44 (7)	54 (12)	69 (21)	81 (27)	86 (30)	87 (31)	86 (30)	83 (28)	73 (23)	60 (16)	48 (9)	90 (32)
Mean daily maximum °F (°C)	23.2 (−4.9)	26.2 (−3.2)	34.7 (1.5)	47.3 (8.5)	62.1 (16.7)	71.5 (21.9)	76.7 (24.8)	75.5 (24.2)	68.1 (20.1)	53.7 (12.1)	40.4 (4.7)	29.2 (−1.6)	50.7 (10.4)
Daily mean °F (°C)	13.7 (−10.2)	15.5 (−9.2)	24.4 (−4.2)	37.6 (3.1)	51.0 (10.6)	60.6 (15.9)	65.9 (18.8)	64.2 (17.9)	56.8 (13.8)	44.6 (7.0)	32.8 (0.4)	21.4 (−5.9)	40.7 (4.8)
Mean daily minimum °F (°C)	4.3 (−15.4)	4.9 (−15.1)	14.0 (−10.0)	27.8 (−2.3)	39.9 (4.4)	49.7 (9.8)	55.1 (12.8)	52.9 (11.6)	45.5 (7.5)	35.4 (1.9)	25.2 (−3.8)	13.6 (−10.2)	30.7 (−0.7)
Mean minimum °F (°C)	−19 (−28)	−16 (−27)	−9 (−23)	14 (−10)	28 (−2)	37 (3)	44 (7)	41 (5)	31 (−1)	23 (−5)	9 (−13)	−7 (−22)	−21 (−29)
Record low °F (°C)	−37 (−38)	−37 (−38)	−23 (−31)	−9 (−23)	20 (−7)	29 (−2)	34 (1)	30 (−1)	20 (−7)	14 (−10)	−9 (−23)	−26 (−32)	−37 (−38)
Average precipitation inches (mm)	2.79 (71)	2.43 (62)	3.04 (77)	3.79 (96)	3.61 (92)	4.45 (113)	3.96 (101)	3.57 (91)	3.23 (82)	4.61 (117)	3.80 (97)	3.76 (96)	43.04 (1,095)
Average snowfall inches (cm)	22.7 (58)	22.9 (58)	22.2 (56)	7.6 (19)	0.0 (0.0)	0.0 (0.0)	0.0 (0.0)	0.0 (0.0)	0.0 (0.0)	2.6 (6.6)	7.2 (18)	23.9 (61)	109.1 (276.6)
Source 1: NOAA
Source 2: XMACIS (temp records & monthly max/mins)

== 1959 Air Accident ==
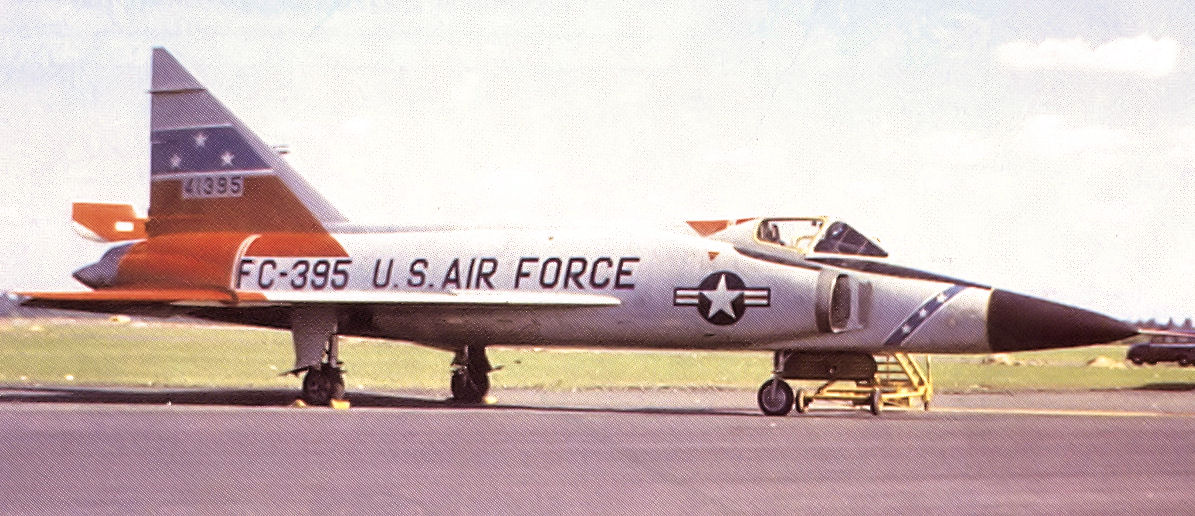
A 37th Squadron F-102 like the one in Flagstaff Lake.

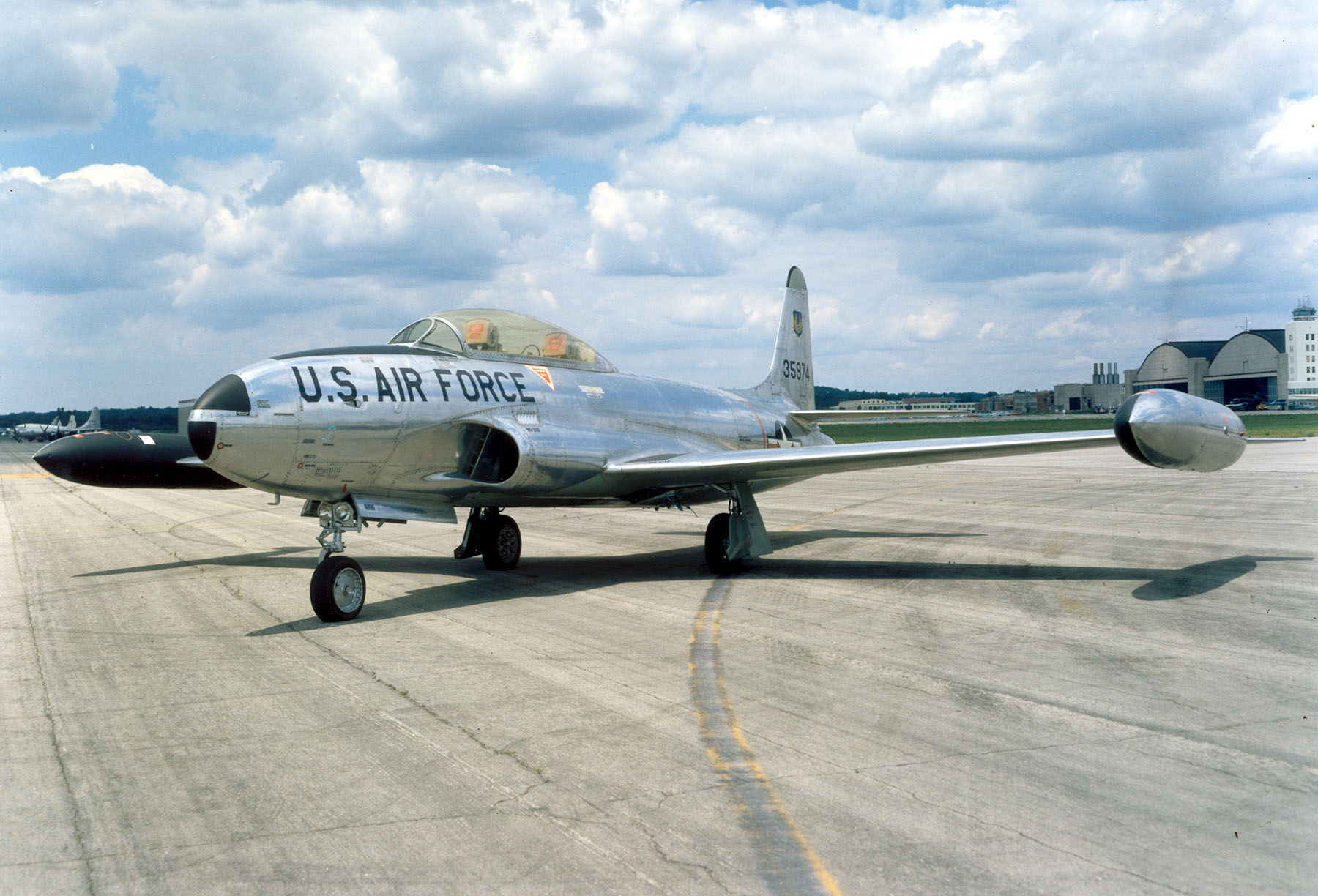
The other aircraft destroyed by the collision was similar to this T-33A.

A mid-air collision occurred over the lake during a United States Air Force exercise on the evening of 3 November 1959. A Lockheed T-33 Shooting Star simulated an enemy aircraft approaching from the east while ground-controlled interception directed Convair F-102 Delta Daggers of the 37th Fighter-Interceptor Squadron from Burlington International Airport to intercept it. One of the F-102s pressed a simulated firing run too close as the interception occurred over the lake, and the F-102 delta wing cut the tail off the T-33. The T-33 crew ejected successfully, but the rear seat crewman died when he became tangled in his parachute and landed upside down near the front section of the T-33. The front half of the T-33 was discovered in 1959, and the back half was discovered a few years later. The F-102 aircraft was discovered in Flagstaff Lake in 1979, but the pilot was never found.
