= Western Maine Lakes and Mountains =

Western Lakes and Mountains
- Composition: Androscoggin; Franklin; Oxford; part of Cumberland
- Largest city: Lewiston

Area
  - Total: 4,957 sq mi (12,840 km^{2})
  - Land: 4,710 sq mi (12,200 km^{2})
  - Water: 247 sq mi (640 km^{2})

Population (2020)
  - Total: 264,754
  - Density: 56.2/sq mi (21.7/km^{2})
- Demonym: Westerner

The Western Lakes and Mountains region spans most of Maine's western border with New Hampshire. A small part of the scenic White Mountain National Forest is located in this area. The region consists of Oxford County, Androscoggin County, Franklin County, as well as northern York and interior Cumberland counties. The largest cities in the region are Lewiston and Auburn. Notable towns include Bethel, Bridgton, Oxford, Rangeley, and Rumford. Many of the state's highest peaks are located in the region, although the highest, Mount Katahdin, is not.

The area is known for its crystal clear lakes and scenic hiking trails in the summer. Fall can also bring tourists who come to see the brilliant Autumn leaf color provided by the region's maple-dominated forestry. In the winter, skiing becomes the region's largest attraction. This region has many resorts and ski areas to choose from, including Pleasant Mountain in Bridgton, Sunday River in Bethel, Black Mountain in Rumford, Saddleback Mountain in Rangeley, and Sugarloaf in Carrabassett Valley. The economy in these areas is largely based on seasonal activities and tourism.

The Appalachian National Scenic Trail passes through this region, and the portion that passes through the region's Mahoosuc Notch is popularly considered by hikers to be the most difficult mile of the entire trail.

== Communities ==
Name	County	Population (2020)
Auburn	Androscoggin	24,061
Bethel	Oxford	2,504
Bridgton	Cumberland	5,418
Casco	Cumberland	3,646
Dixfield	Oxford	2,253
Farmington	Franklin	7,592
Fryeburg	Oxford	3,369
Gray	Cumberland	8,269
Greene	Androscoggin	4,376
Jay	Franklin	4,620
Kingfield	Franklin	960
Lewiston	Androscoggin	37,121
Lisbon	Androscoggin	9,711
Livermore Falls	Androscoggin	5,187 (Note: Population includes Livermore)
Mechanic Falls	Androscoggin	3,107
Mexico	Oxford	2,756
Naples	Cumberland	3,925
Norway	Oxford	5,077
Oxford	Oxford	4,229
Paris	Oxford	6,945 (Note: Population includes West Paris)
Porter	Oxford	1,600
Rangeley	Franklin	1,222
Rumford	Oxford	5,858
Sabattus	Androscoggin	5,044
Standish	Cumberland	10,244
Turner	Androscoggin	5,817
Wilton	Franklin	3,835
Windham	Cumberland	18,434

== See also ==
- Aziscohos Lake
- Appalachian Trail
- Bates College
- Central Maine Community College
- Crocker Mountain
- Grafton Notch State Park
- Highland Lake
- Kennebago Lake
- Lake Auburn
- Long Lake
- Kezar Lake
- Lovewell Pond
- Mooselookmeguntic Lake
- Moose Pond
- Mount Abraham
- Mount Bigelow
- Mount Blue State Park
- Mount Redington
- Old Speck Mountain
- Panther Pond
- Pleasant Lake
- Rangeley Lake
- Rangeley Lake State Park
- Range Ponds State Park
- Richardson Lakes
- Sabattus Pond
- Saddleback Mountain
- Saint Joseph's College of Maine
- Sebago Lake
- Sebago Lake State Park
- South Crocker Mountain
- Spaulding Mountain
- Sugarloaf Mountain
- Sunday River (ski resort)
- The Horn
- Thompson Lake
- Little Sebago Lake
- Umbagog Lake
- University of Maine at Farmington
- Webb Lake
