= Mount Abraham (Maine) =

Mountain in Maine, United States

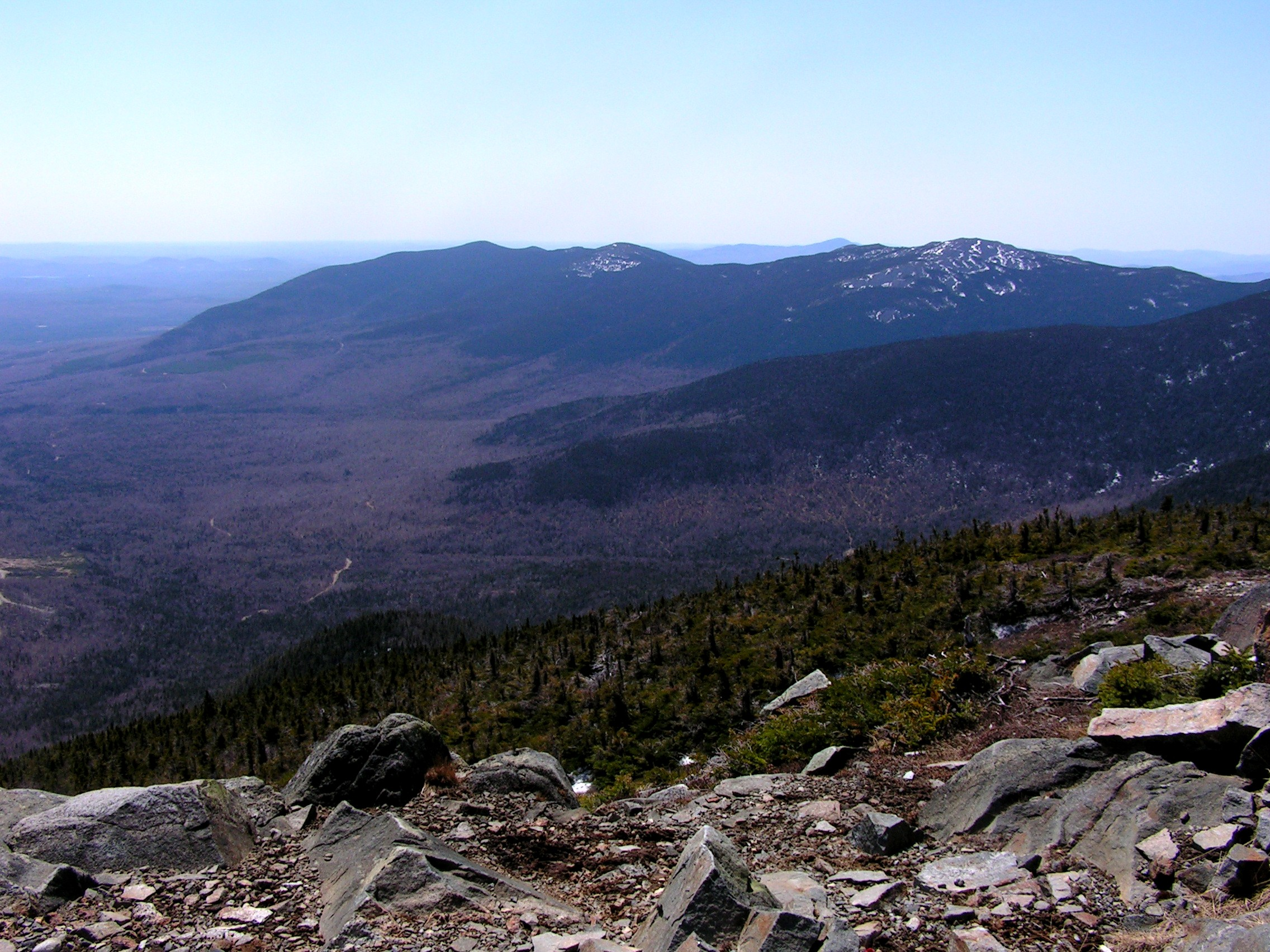
- Mount Abraham viewed from the north, from atop nearby Sugarloaf Mountain

Highest point
- Elevation: 4,050 ft (1,230 m)
- Prominence: 900 ft (270 m)
- Listing: New England 4000 footers
- Coordinates: 44°58.38′N 70°19.59′W

Geography
- Location within Maine
- Location: Franklin County, Maine, U.S.
- Topo map: USGS Mount Abraham

Mount Abraham is a 4,050 feet (1,230 m) mountain located in Franklin County, Maine. One of Maine's "4,000 footers", it is flanked to the north by Spaulding Mountain.

== Watersheds ==
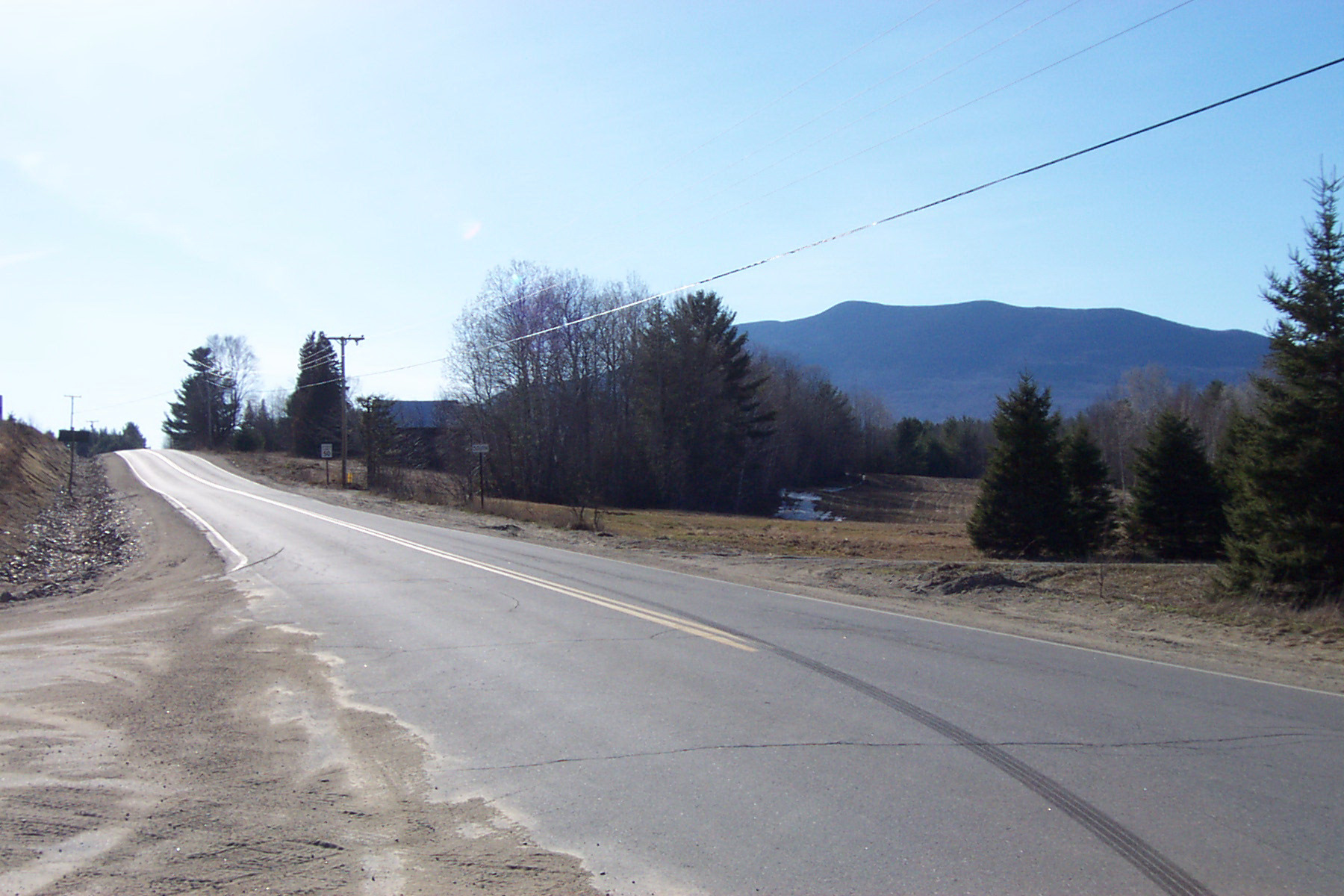
Mount Abraham viewed from the south, at the junction of Routes 142 and 145, in Freeman Township

The northeast side of Mt. Abraham is drained by Rapid Stream, then into the West Branch of the Carrabassett River, the Kennebec River, and into the Gulf of Maine. The southern half of the southwest side drains into Quick Stream, then into the West Branch. The northern half drains into Perham Stream, then into Orbeton Stream, and the Sandy River, another tributary of the Kennebec.

== History ==
The mountain was logged in the late 19th century. Timber was moved down-slope in ice-covered wooden sluices. Logs, lumber, and pulpwood were shipped on the narrow-gauge Sandy River and Rangeley Lakes Railroad.

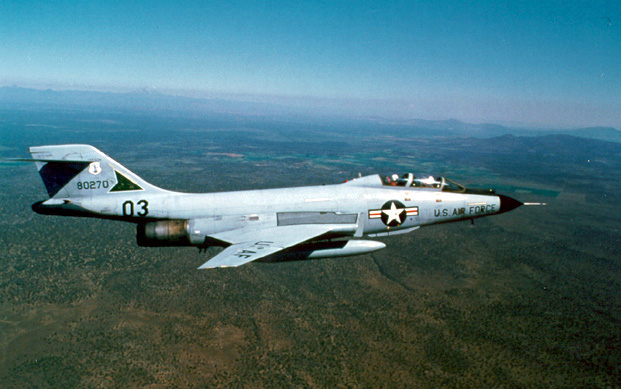
F-101B fighter similar to the one which crashed on Mount Abraham

A McDonnell F-101B Voodoo of the 60th Fighter-Interceptor Squadron out of Otis AFB, Massachusetts, crashed onto the mountain after colliding with another F-101B during a cross-country formation flight on 14 November 1967. The two-man crew of No.57-376 ejected with minor injuries and the second aircraft made an emergency landing at Dow AFB.

== Access ==
The Appalachian Trail (AT), a 2,194 mi (3,531 km) National Scenic Trail from Georgia to Maine, runs between Saddleback Junior and Spaulding, passing 2 mi (3.2 km) northwest of the summit of Abraham. The summit of Mount Abraham can be reached from the AT via the blue-blazed Mount Abraham Side Trail.

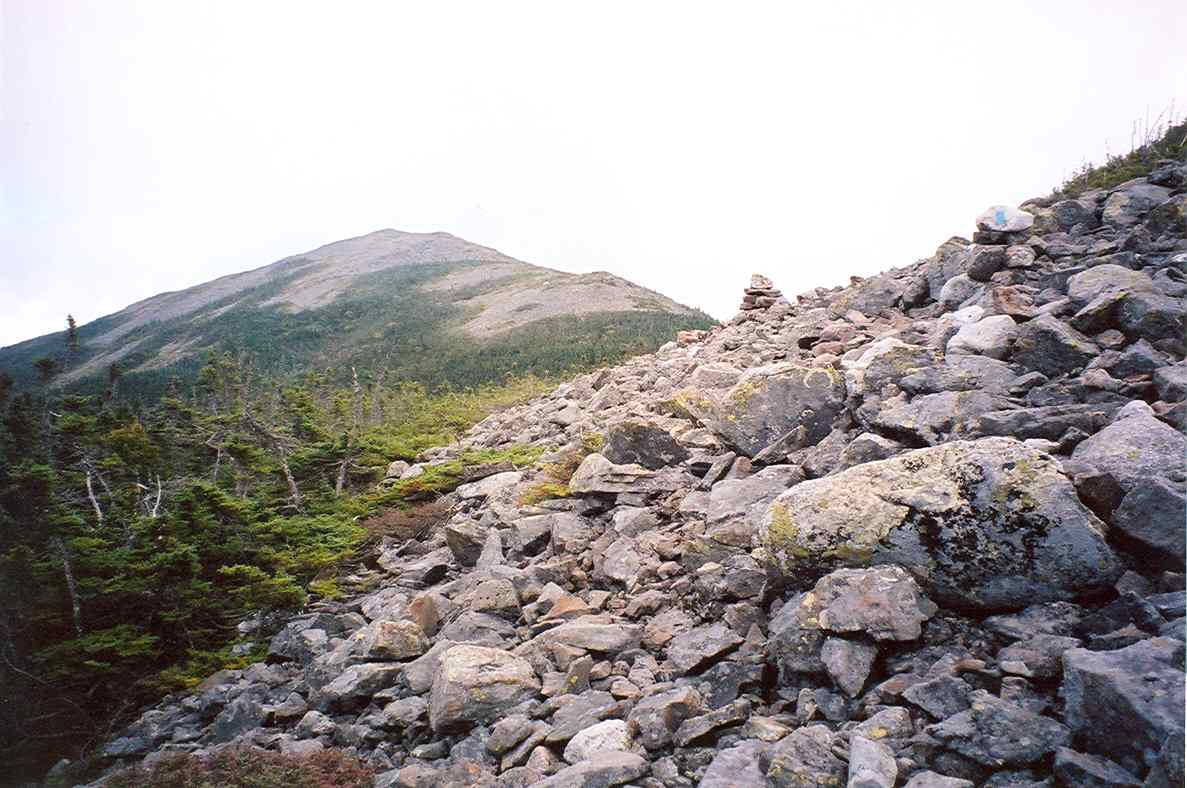
Mount Abraham seen from the Mount Abraham Side Trail

== See also ==
- List of mountains in Maine
