= Sugarloaf Community Wind Farm =

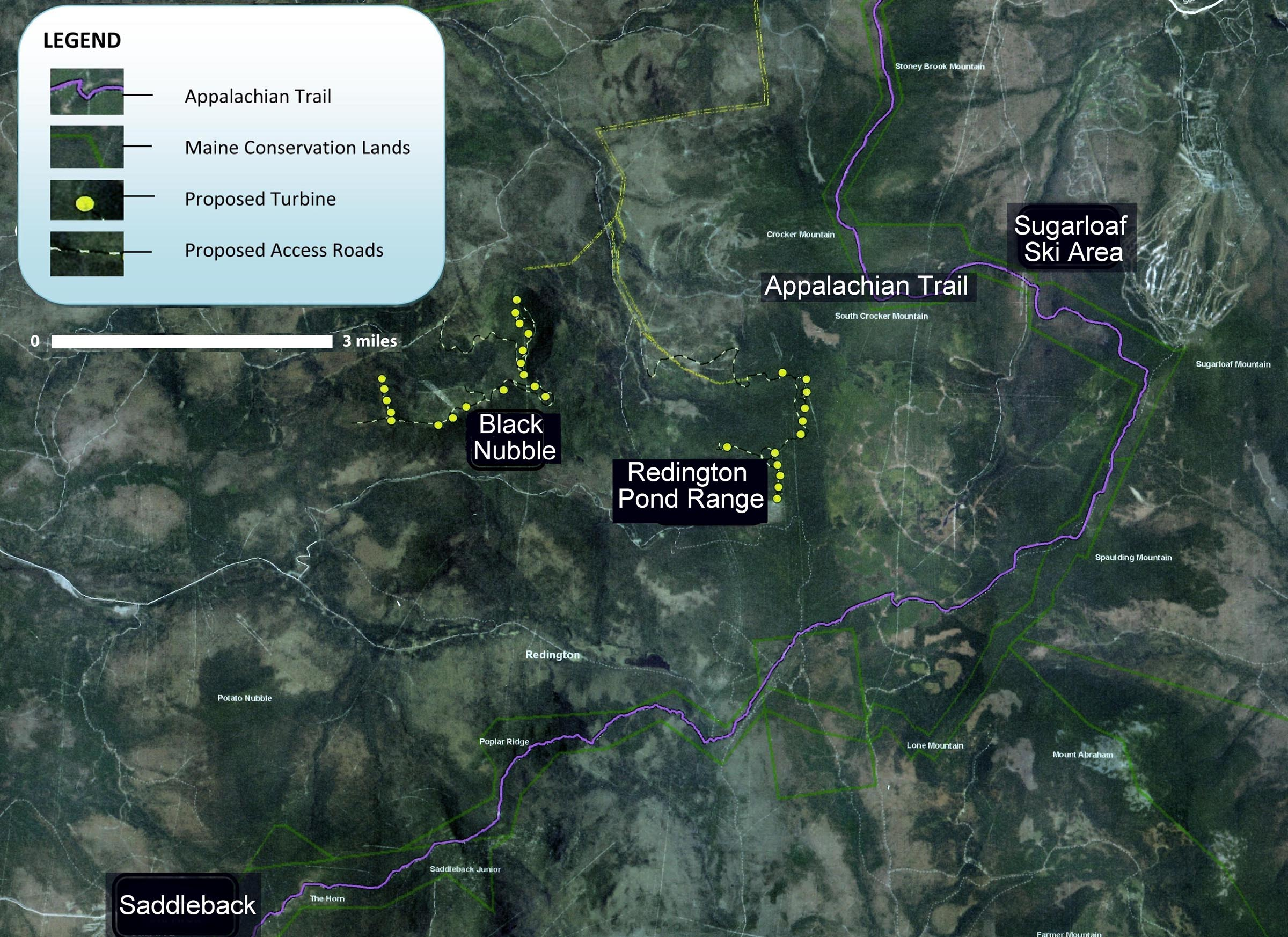
Map of proposed Sugarloaf Community Wind Farm in Redington Township, adjacent to Carrabassett Valley, Maine

The Sugarloaf Community Wind Farm is a wind power project in western Maine under development by Endless Energy Corporation. The wind farm is planned to be situated between the Sugarloaf and the Saddleback Maine ski resorts on Redington Pond Range and Black Nubble Mountains.

The 30 wind turbine project is estimated to have a cost of $180 million and would have a capacity of over 90 megawatts, enough to power roughly 40,000 Maine homes.

== History ==
The Sugarloaf Community Wind Farm was derived from the proposed Redington Wind Farm, a previous project by Maine Mountain Power, a joint venture of Endless Energy and Edison Mission Group. In 2007 a permit for this project was denied by the Land Use Regulation Commission although their staff had recommended approval. The developer proposed an alternative project cut down to being only on Black Nubble, which was rejected by LURC a year later.

== Public opinion ==
Some controversy has surrounded the possibility of a wind farm on the Mount Redington area. Numerous positive environmental effects of wind power have been cited, including pollution avoided from electricity generation from fossil fuels as well as the fact that unlike electricity production from fossil fuel power plants such as coal or petroleum, wind power does not need to use water for cooling. A survey by the Potholm group in 2006 showed 9:1 statewide public support for a wind farm on Redington Mountain (with a margin of error of 5%). The same survey found that 74% of dues paying members of environmental groups in the state were also in favor.

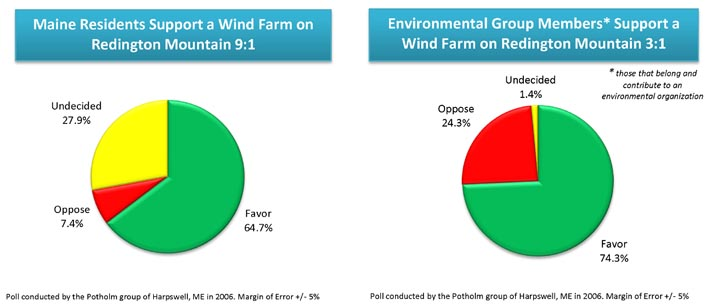
In a 2006 survey, Maine residents and environmentalists overwhelmingly supported a wind farm on Redington Mountain

However, the boards of various Appalachian Trail affiliates have opposed the project because of its proximity to the trail. Maine Audubon has also expressed concerns for the fragile environment of the mountains of western Maine. The Natural Resources Council of Maine opposed the full project, but supported the reduced Black Nubble version.

== Annexation ==
At a selectmen's meeting on January 5, 2009, Endless Energy spoke to Carrabassett Valley residents about the possibility of the town to annex the site of the proposed wind farm in the adjacent Redington Township. The town would benefit from the additional property taxes it would receive from the project as well as other benefits of wind farm development such as stable priced power and job creation. The wind farm would benefit from being included in Maine’s expedited wind power permitting zone, as designated by the Governor’s Wind Power Task Force which was put into state law in 2008. The selectmen unanimously voted in favor of sending a Bill into the Maine Legislature.

The annexation bill (SP288)LD741 passed Maine’s Joint Standing Committee on State and Local Government 8-3 on May 11, 2009 with the amendment that all of Redington Township be annexed. To become law it would have required a positive vote from the Senate and House as well as a majority vote in a Carrabassett Valley referendum. For the wind farm to get permits, it would then have then applied to the Department of Environmental Protection instead of the Land Use Regulation Commission. On June 1, 2009, the Maine Senate voted against the annexation 29-6, and two days later the House also voted it down.

== See also ==
- Mount Redington
- Black Nubble (Redington Township, Maine)
