= Crocker Mountain =

Crocker Mountain or Mount Crocker may refer to:

- Crocker Mountain (Maine), United States
- Mount Crocker, California, United States
- Mount Crocker, east of Comet, Queensland, Australia

== See also ==
- South Crocker Mountain, Maine
- Crocker Mountains, Malaysia
