= Mount Redington =

Mountain in United States of America

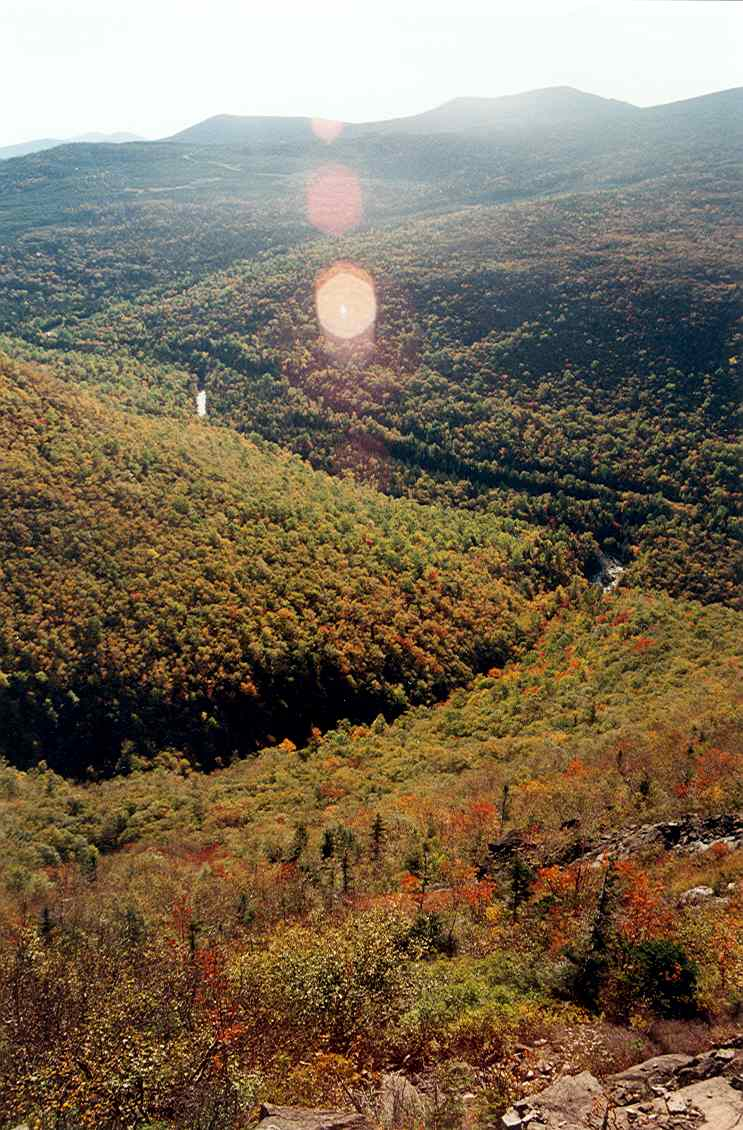
- Mount Redington from the AT on Sugarloaf

Highest point
- Elevation: 4000+ ft (1219+ m) NGVD 29
- Prominence: 440 ft (130 m)
- Listing: New England 4000 footers
- Coordinates: 45°1.50′N 70°23.32′W

Geography
- Location within Maine
- Location: Franklin County, Maine, U.S.
- Topo map: USGS Black Nubble

Climbing
- Easiest route: herd path

Mount Redington is a mountain located in Franklin County, Maine. Redington is flanked to the northeast by South Crocker Mountain and to the west by Black Nubble. Redington stands just northeast of the U.S. Navy Survival Escape and Evasion Training Facility (USSEAETF).

The southeast side of Redington drains into the South Branch of the Carrabassett River, then into the Kennebec River, and into the Gulf of Maine. The northwest side of Redington drains into Nash Stream, then into the South Branch of the Dead River, Flagstaff Lake, the Dead River and the Kennebec.

The Appalachian Trail (AT), a 2,170 mi (3,490 km) National Scenic Trail from Georgia to Maine, is routed around Mt. Redington, to instead pass near the summit of Sugarloaf Mountain (4,250 feet or 1,300 metres) — the second highest peak in the state of Maine. The AT runs from Saddleback Junior to the southwest, over Spaulding Mountain and Sugarloaf to the east, and passes about a mile northeast of Redington, at the summit of South Crocker.

Mount Redington and Owl's Head in New Hampshire are the only New England four-thousand footers without a maintained trail to the summit.

== Wind farm proposal ==
In 2005, Maine Mountain Power filed an application with the Maine Land Use Regulation Committee (LURC) for a permit to develop a 30-turbine wind farm on Redington and neighboring Black Nubble. After years of contentious debate, the proposal was voted down by the LURC in 2007. The summit of Redington was seen as too ecologically sensitive — a sub-alpine fir habitat providing a home for two rare species, the bog lemming and Bicknell's thrush. Also, the development would have been visible for miles along the AT. A revised proposal, which would have developed wind power only on Black Nubble, was rejected by the LURC in 2008. As of early 2009, the wind farm project was being planned as the Sugarloaf Community Wind Farm.

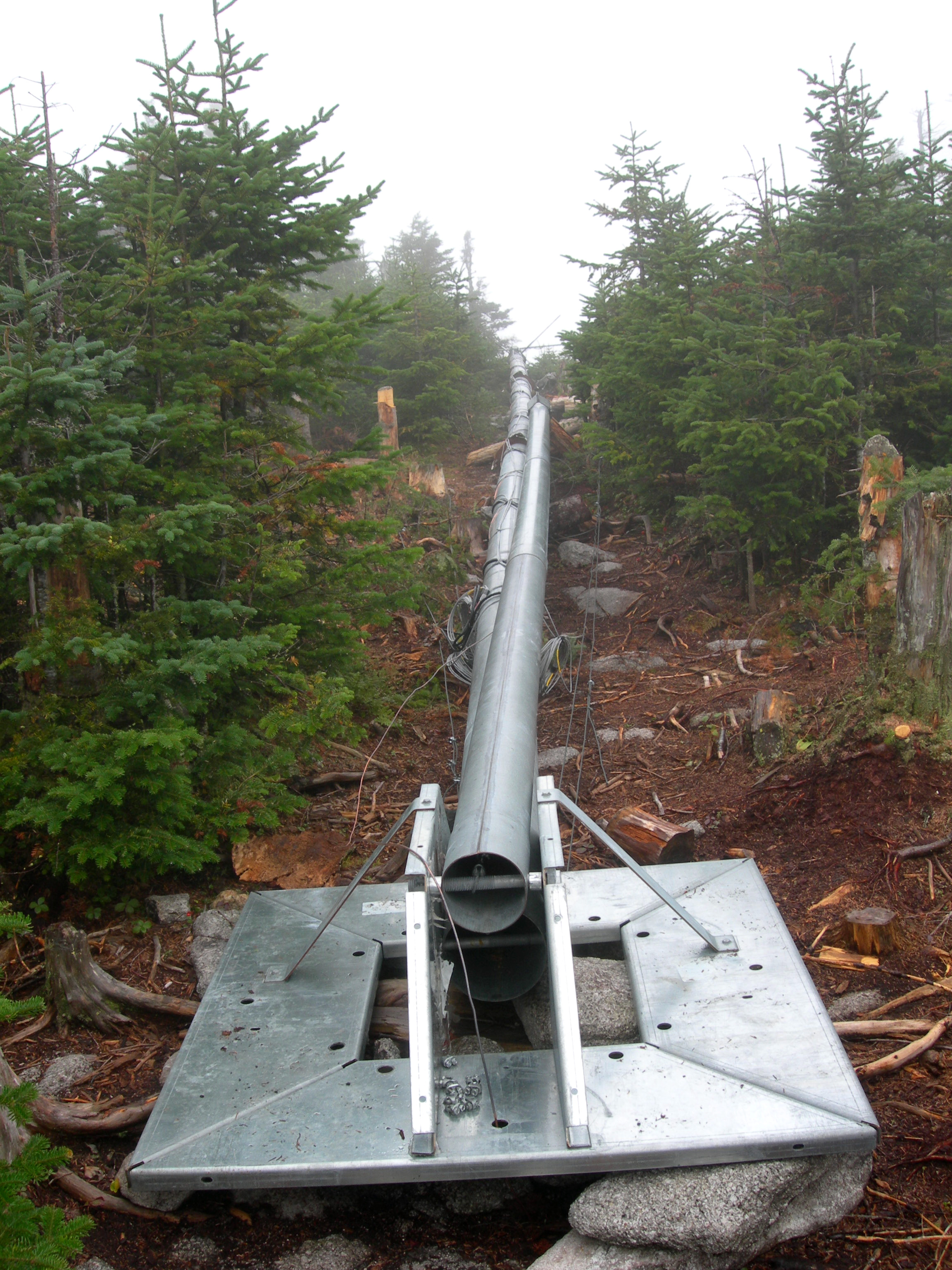
Tower mast on Redington summit

== See also ==
- List of mountains of Maine
