= Carrabassett Valley Academy =

Location
- 3197 Carrabassett Drive; Carrabassett Valley, Maine 04947; United States; 45°04′44″N 70°18′39″W

Information
- Type: Ski Academy
- Established: 1982
- Headmaster: Alex Godomsky
- Staff: 50
- Enrollment: 84 Students
- Average class size: 12 students
- Student to teacher ratio: 6:1
- Campus: 25 Acres
- Colors: Green, White
- Athletics: Skiing, Snowboarding
- Mascot: Big Dogs
- Website: www.gocva.com

Carrabassett Valley Academy (CVA) is a private ski and snowboard academy in Carrabassett Valley, Maine, at the base of Sugarloaf Mountain. Established in 1982, the school's alumni include Olympic competitors Bode Miller, Seth Wescott, Kirsten Clark, and Emily Cook, as well as Jeremy Jones, nine-time Snowboard Magazine Big Mountain Rider of the Year. Since 1982 CVA alumni have included 12 Olympians, winners of 92 US national titles, 11 X-Games competitors, 26 NCAA and USCSA All-Americans, 39 US national team members, and six world champions.

== History ==
The Sugarloaf Region Ski Education Foundation (SRSEF) was founded in 1968 as a non-profit organization offering advanced ski training. In 1972 the Maine State Board of Education approved a tutorial program at the center, held for four to five weeks during the winter. Students skied in the morning and were tutored in the afternoon. Their home schools provided work while the SRSEF provided tutors and a space to study. In 1982 the SRSEF helped found CVA as a five-month tutorial program, in a new campus in the former Capricorn Lodge, and the following year it became a nine-month ski academy, with 20 students.

The SRSEF hosted all competitions at Sugarloaf, from high-school level races to the US Alpine championships, until 1992, when they created the Competition Center. In 1995 Sugarloaf and CVA took over the SRSEF weekend program, initially called the Junior Competition Program, then later Sugarloaf Carrabassett Valley Academy (SCVA). It is now known as the CVA Weekend Program.

From the 1990s to early 2000s, a building known as the Lumberjack was used as a girls' dorm, but it was sold in the 1990s. The Capricorn Lodge was used for classrooms, dining, equipment storage, and the boys' dormitory. Today Murphey Hall, a three-story building, is used as a dormitory for all students.

CVA has students from abroad, including Japan, Korea, Europe, Australia, New Zealand, and South Africa. Since 2010 the school has maintained close links with Lycee Lannemezan, a winter sports school in Lannemezan, France.

== Notable alumni ==
- Bode Miller - 2004/2005; 2007/2008 Alpine Overall World Cup Champion; Olympic Gold, Silver, & Bronze Medalist
- Seth Wescott - 2006 and 2010 Olympic Gold Medalist, Snowboard Cross
- Jeremy Jones - 9-time Snowboard Magazine Big Mountain Rider of the Year
- Kirsten Clark - US World Cup & Olympic Ski Team Member. US National Downhill Champion
- Emily Cook - US Olympic Freestyle Team Member
- Julie Parisien - US World Cup & Olympic Ski Team Member. US National SL/GS Champion
- Sam Morse - US Ski Team Member
- Joan Margarit - Co-Founder TwoJeys™
