= South Crocker Mountain =

Mountain in United States of America

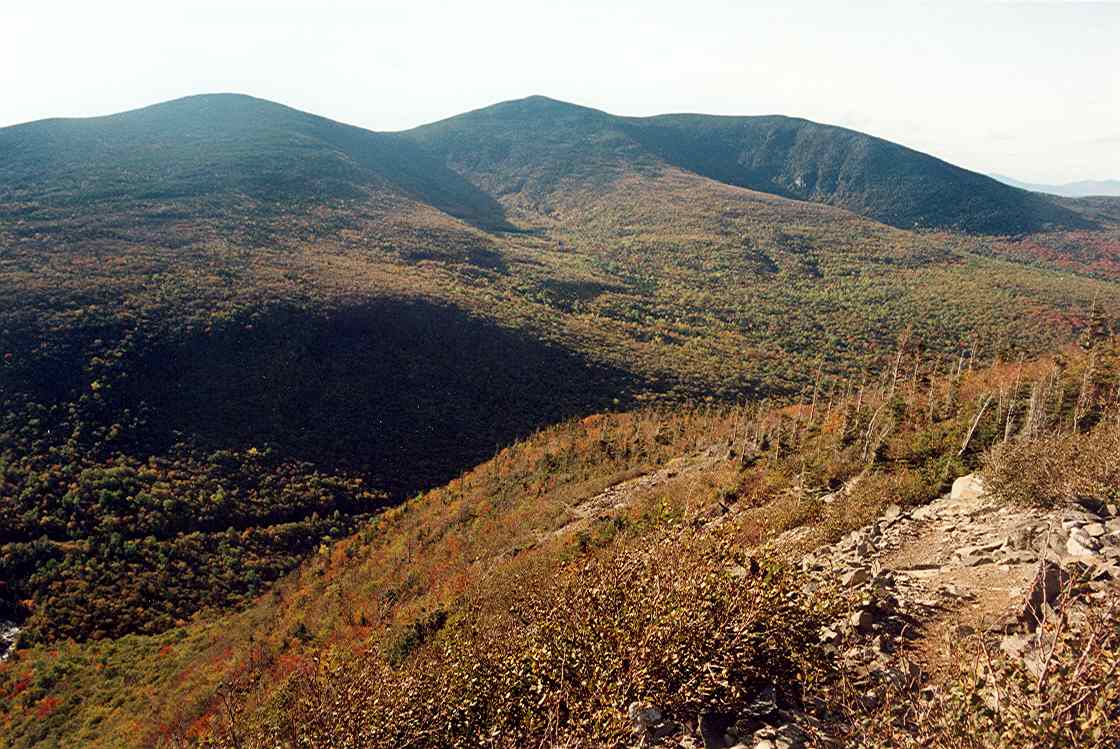
- South Crocker (left) seen from the AT

Highest point
- Elevation: 4,042 ft (1,232 m)
- Prominence: 340 feet (104 m)
- Listing: New England 4000 footers
- Coordinates: 45°2′10.25″N 70°22′33.85″W

Geography
- Location within Maine
- Location: Franklin County, Maine, U.S.
- Topo map: USGS Black Nubble

South Crocker Mountain is a mountain located in Franklin County, Maine. South Crocker Mountain is flanked to the north by Crocker Mountain, and to the southwest by Mount Redington.

The northeast and southeast faces of South Crocker Mountain drain into the South Branch of the Carrabassett River, which flows into the Kennebec River, and into the Gulf of Maine. The west face of South Crocker drains into Nash Stream, thence into the South Branch of the Dead River, Flagstaff Lake, the Dead River, another tributary of the Kennebec.

The Appalachian Trail, a 2,170 mi (3,492 km) National Scenic Trail from Georgia to Maine, traverses the summit of South Crocker Mountain, running north along the ridge to Crocker, and east across Caribou Valley to Sugarloaf Mountain.

== See also ==
- List of mountains in Maine
