= Saddleback Junior =

Mountain in Maine, United States

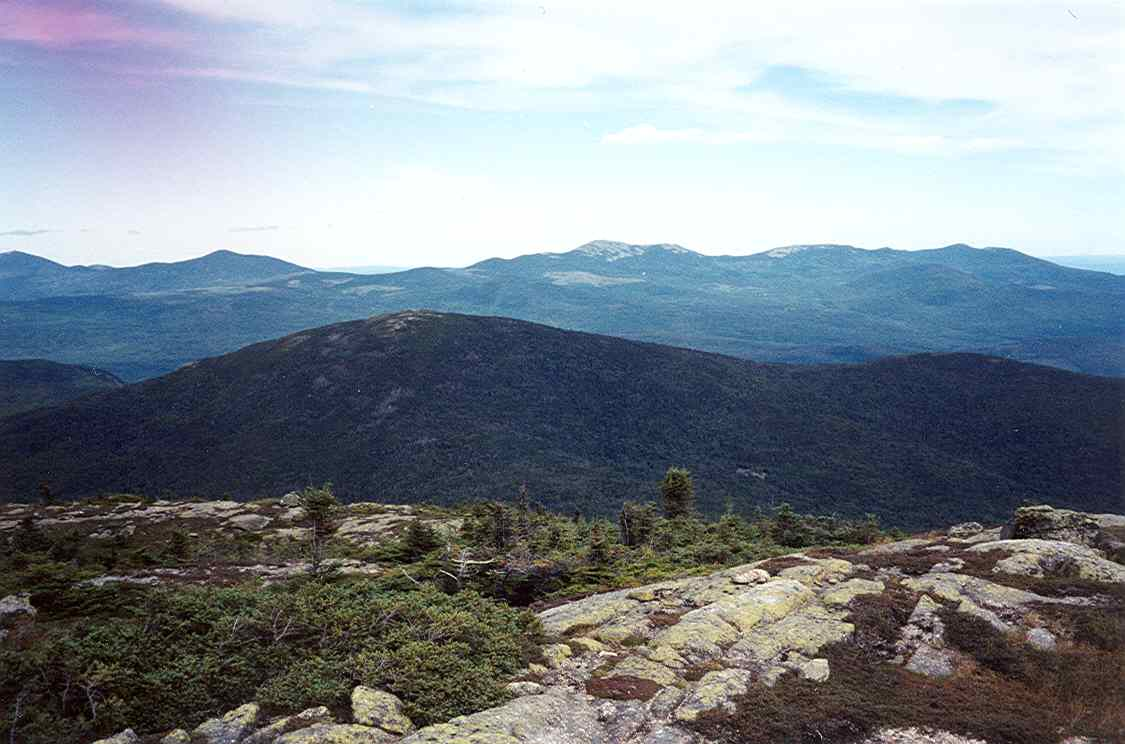
- Saddleback Junior seen from The Horn

Highest point
- Elevation: 3,655 ft (1,114 m)
- Prominence: 620 ft (190 m)
- Coordinates: 44°57′29″N 70°27′28″W

Geography
- Location within Maine
- Location: Franklin County, Maine, U.S.
- Topo map: USGS Redington

Saddleback Junior is a mountain located in Franklin County, Maine. Saddleback Junior is flanked to the southwest by Saddleback Horn, and to the northeast by Poplar Ridge. The mountain is on the south border of the U.S. Navy Survival Escape and Evasion Training Facility (USSEAETF).

Saddleback Junior stands within the watershed of the Kennebec River, which drains into the Gulf of Maine. The northeast and northwest sides of Saddleback Jr. drain into Redington Stream, then into the South Branch of the Dead River, and the Kennebec River. The east and south sides of Saddleback Jr. drain into Hardy Stream, then into Orbeton Stream, and the Sandy River, another tributary of the Kennebec.

The Appalachian Trail, a 2,170 mi (3,490 km) National Scenic Trail from Georgia to Maine, runs across the summit of Saddleback Junior, between Saddleback and Spaulding Mountain.

== See also ==
- List of mountains in Maine
