= Black Nubble =

Mountain in Maine, United States

- Location within Maine

Highest point
- Elevation: 3700+ ft (1128+ m) NGVD 29
- Prominence: 900 ft (270 m)
- Coordinates: 45°01′56″N 70°26′50″W

Geography
- Location: Franklin County, Maine, U.S.
- Topo map: USGS Black Nubble

Black Nubble is a mountain located in Franklin County, Maine. Black Nubble is flanked to the southeast by Mount Redington. The U.S. Navy Survival Escape and Evasion Training Facility (USSEAETF) is located just south of Redington.

Black Nubble stands within the watershed of the Kennebec River, which drains into the Gulf of Maine. The east side of Black Nubble drains into Nash Stream, then into the South Branch of the Dead River, Flagstaff Lake, the Dead River and the Kennebec. The west side of Black Nubble drains into the West Branch of Nash Stream. The south end of Black Nubble drains into Orbeton Stream, then into the Sandy River, another tributary of the Kennebec River.

== Wind farm proposal ==
In 2005, Maine Mountain Power (MMP) filed an application with the Maine Land Use Regulation Committee (LURC) for a permit to develop a 30-turbine wind farm on Black Nubble and neighboring Mt. Redington. After years of contentious debate, the proposal was voted down by the LURC in 2007. The summit of Redington was seen as too ecologically sensitive — a sub-alpine fir habitat providing a home for two rare species, the bog lemming and Bicknell's thrush. Also, the development would have been visible for miles along the Appalachian Trail. A revised proposal, for 18 turbines only on Black Nubble, was put forward by MMP, supported by many environmental groups, but still opposed by Maine Audubon. The project was rejected by the LURC in 2008.

== See also ==
- List of mountains in Maine
