= Saddleback Horn =

Mountain in Maine, United States

The Horn
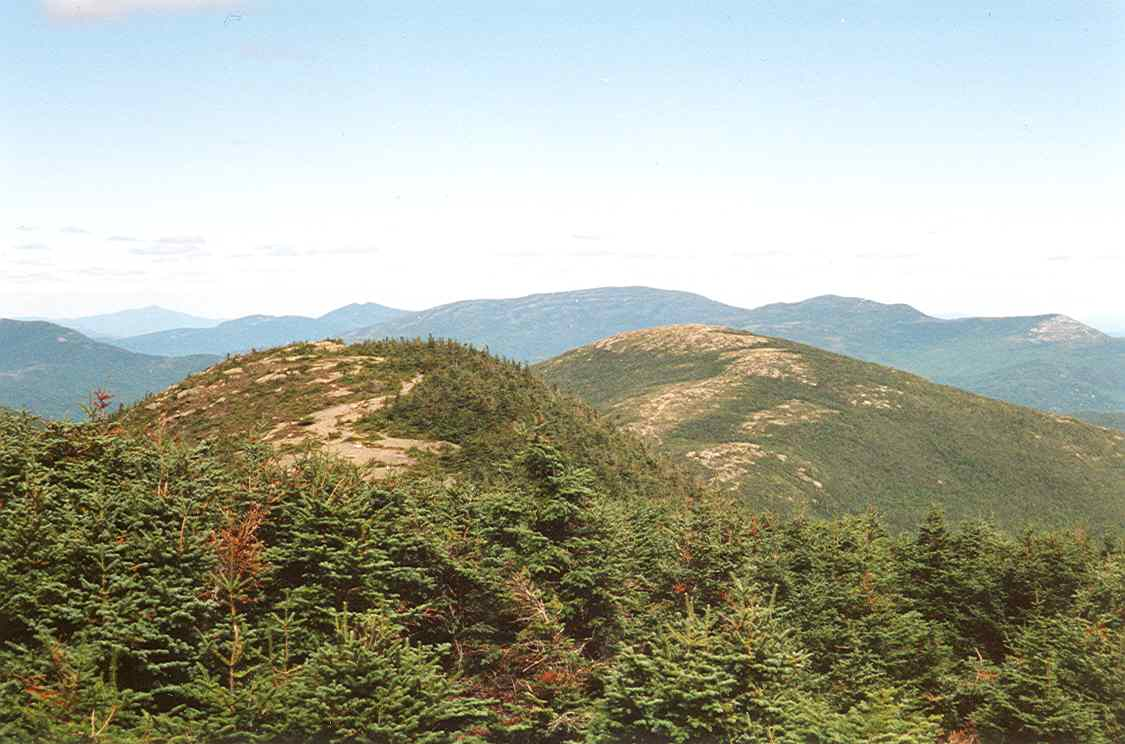
- The Horn (R), seen from Saddleback Mtn. ridge

Highest point
- Elevation: 4,041 ft (1,232 m)
- Prominence: 470 ft (140 m)
- Listing: New England 4000 footers
- Coordinates: 44°57′05″N 70°29′14″W

Geography
- Location within Maine
- Location: Franklin County, Maine, U.S.
- Topo map: USGS Redington

The Horn (or Saddleback Horn) is a mountain located in Franklin County, Maine. The Horn is flanked to the southwest by the main summit of Saddleback Mountain, to the northeast by Saddleback Junior, and to the northwest by Potato Nubble.

The Horn drains to the northeast into Redington Stream, then into the South Branch of the Dead River, the Kennebec River, and into the Gulf of Maine. The Horn drains to the west into Saddleback Lake, then into Redington Stream. The Horn drains to the south into Winship Stream, then into Conant Stream, Orbeton Stream, and the Sandy River, another tributary of the Kennebec. The Horn drains to the southeast into Hardy Stream, then into Orbeton Stream.

The Appalachian Trail, a 2,170 mi (3,490 km) National Scenic Trail from Georgia to Maine, runs along the ridge of Saddleback, including the summit of The Horn.

== See also ==
- List of mountains in Maine
