= Crocker Mountain (Maine) =

Mountain in United States of America

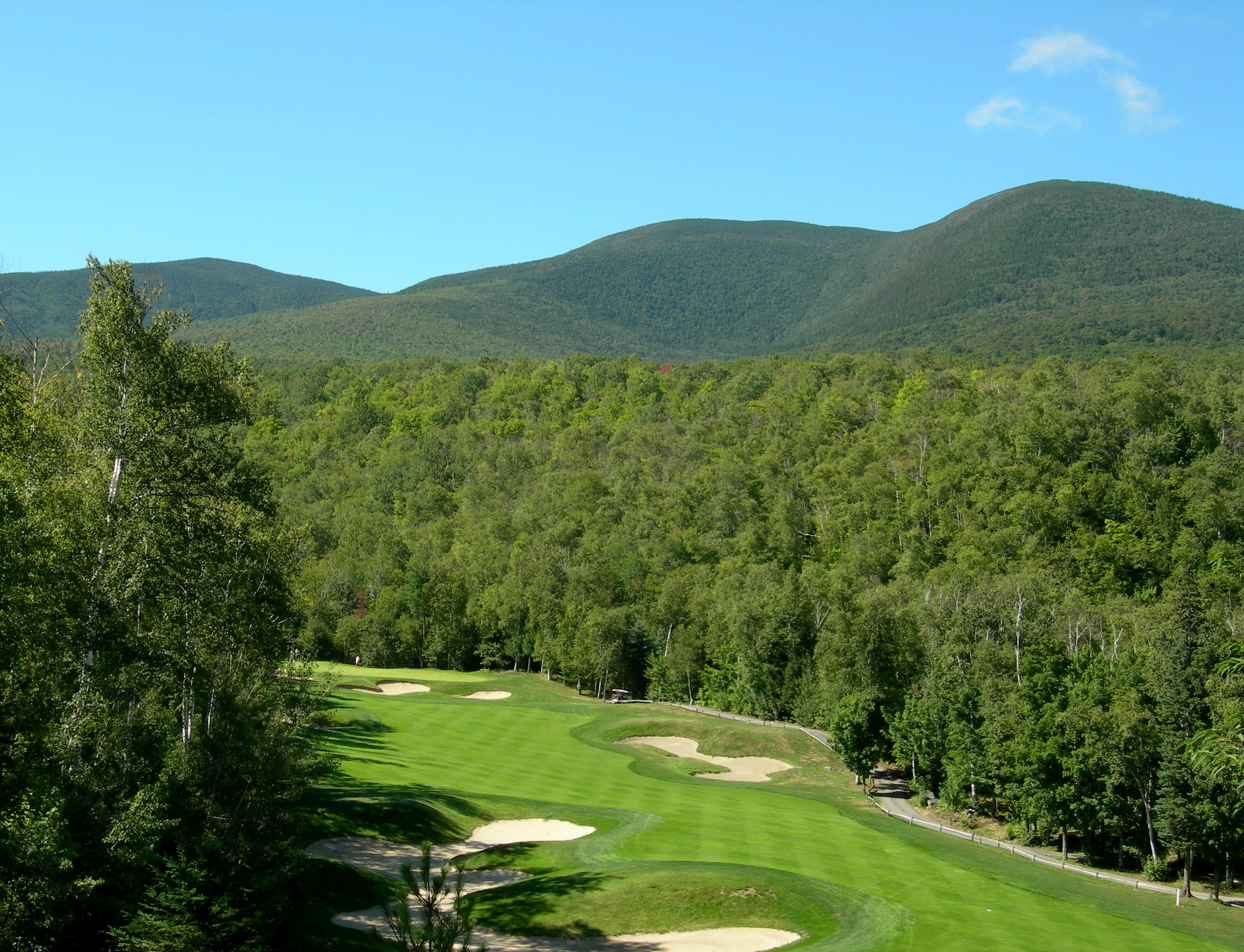
- Crocker Mountain (center) seen from Sugarloaf ski resort

Highest point
- Elevation: 4,229 ft (1,289 m)
- Prominence: 1,206 ft (368 m)
- Listing: New England 4000 footers
- Coordinates: 45°02′50″N 70°22′58″W

Geography
- Location within Maine
- Location: Franklin County, Maine, U.S.
- Topo map: USGS Black Nubble

Crocker Mountain is a 4,228 ft (1,289 m) peak located in Carrabassett Valley, Franklin County, Maine, in the United States. Crocker Mountain is the fourth highest mountain in the state after the Katahdins (Baxter and Hamlin peaks) and Sugarloaf Mountain, and is part of the Appalachian Mountains. Crocker Mountain is traversed by the Appalachian Trail (AT), a 2,170 mi (3,490 km) National Scenic Trail from Georgia to Maine.

A glacial cirque called "Crocker Cirque" is located between the main summit and the lower summit of South Crocker Mountain. Crocker Cirque contains a small pond and can be reached via the Appalachian Trail.

Brooks on the east side of Crocker Mountain feed the South Branch of the Carrabassett River, which flows into the Kennebec River, and into the Gulf of Maine. The northwest side of Crocker drains into Stoney Brook, then into Stratton Brook, Flagstaff Lake, and the Dead River, another tributary of the Kennebec. The southwest side of Crocker drains into Nash Stream, then into the South Branch of the Dead River.

== Climate ==
Climate data for Crocker Mountain 45.0510 N, 70.3816 W, Elevation: 3,976 ft (1,212 m) (1991–2020 normals)
Month	Jan	Feb	Mar	Apr	May	Jun	Jul	Aug	Sep	Oct	Nov	Dec	Year
Mean daily maximum °F (°C)	18.9 (−7.3)	20.9 (−6.2)	27.2 (−2.7)	41.1 (5.1)	54.1 (12.3)	63.1 (17.3)	68.0 (20.0)	67.0 (19.4)	60.6 (15.9)	47.5 (8.6)	31.6 (−0.2)	24.7 (−4.1)	43.7 (6.5)
Daily mean °F (°C)	11.1 (−11.6)	12.5 (−10.8)	18.9 (−7.3)	31.9 (−0.1)	44.9 (7.2)	54.2 (12.3)	59.0 (15.0)	57.8 (14.3)	51.0 (10.6)	38.3 (3.5)	25.7 (−3.5)	15.9 (−8.9)	35.1 (1.7)
Mean daily minimum °F (°C)	3.2 (−16.0)	4.2 (−15.4)	10.6 (−11.9)	22.7 (−5.2)	35.8 (2.1)	45.4 (7.4)	50.0 (10.0)	48.6 (9.2)	41.4 (5.2)	29.2 (−1.6)	19.9 (−6.7)	7.1 (−13.8)	26.5 (−3.1)
Average precipitation inches (mm)	4.06 (103)	3.43 (87)	4.22 (107)	4.85 (123)	4.52 (115)	6.61 (168)	5.43 (138)	5.15 (131)	4.90 (124)	5.87 (149)	5.00 (127)	5.16 (131)	59.2 (1,503)
Source: PRISM Climate Group

== Gallery ==
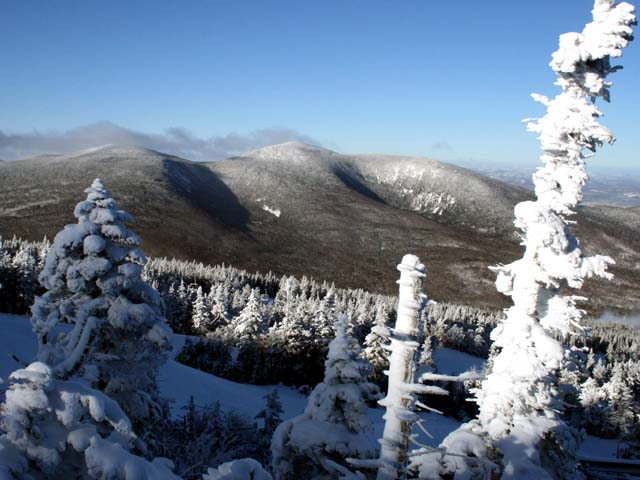
Crocker Mountain (center) in winter

== See also ==
- White Mountain National Forest
