= Carrabassett Valley, Maine =

Town in Maine, United States

- Town
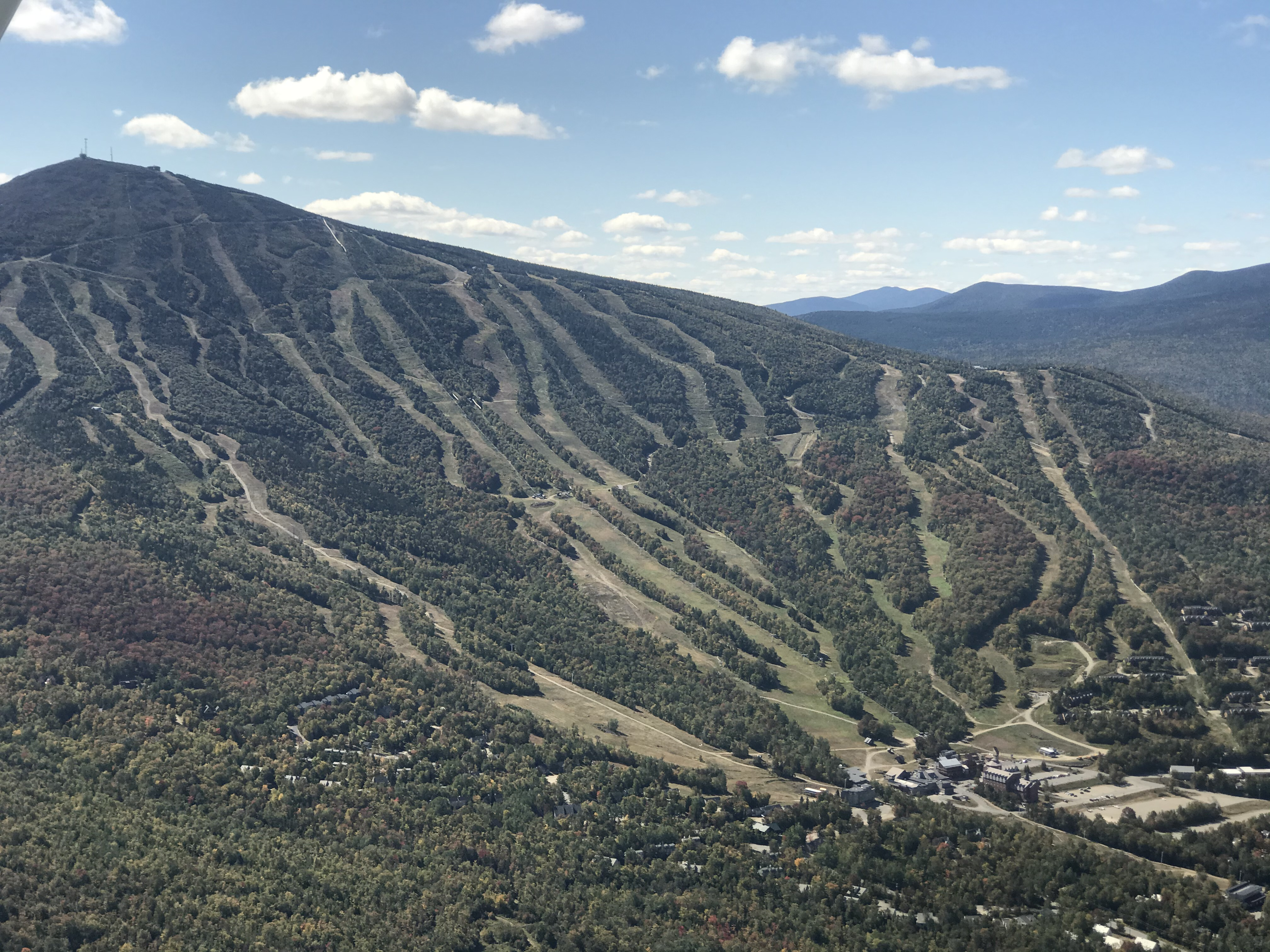
- Sugarloaf Mountain

- Seal
- Motto: "...from here on your life will never be the same"
- Location within Maine Location within the United States
- Coordinates: 45°04′26″N 70°15′42″W
- Country: United States
- State: Maine
- County: Franklin
- Villages: Bigelow; Carrabassett; Records

Area
  - Total: 77.62 sq mi (201.03 km^{2})
  - Land: 77.48 sq mi (200.67 km^{2})
  - Water: 0.14 sq mi (0.36 km^{2})
- Elevation: 1,673 ft (510 m)

Population (2020)
  - Total: 673
  - Density: 8.8/sq mi (3.4/km^{2})
- Time zone: UTC-5 (Eastern (EST))
  - Summer (DST): UTC-4 (EDT)
- ZIP code: 04947
- Area code: 207
- FIPS code: 23-10740
- GNIS feature ID: 582391
- Website: carrabassettvalley.gov

Carrabassett Valley is a town in Franklin County, Maine, United States. The population was 673 at the 2020 census.

== Geography ==
According to the United States Census Bureau, the town has a total area of 77.62 square miles (201.03 km^{2}), of which 77.48 square miles (200.67 km^{2}) is land and 0.14 square miles (0.36 km^{2}) is water. It is named after the Carrabassett River, which flows through the town. The Appalachian Trail crosses the western side of the town, climbing the slopes of Sugarloaf Mountain and the summit of Crocker Mountain. It is the highest elevated incorporated settlement in the state.

== Skiing ==
Carrabassett Valley is home to Sugarloaf, a major ski resort and Carrabassett Valley Academy, a ski and snowboard academy.

== Demographics ==
Historical population
Census	Pop.	Note	%±
1980	107		—
1990	325		203.7%
2000	399		22.8%
2010	781		95.7%
2020	673		−13.8%
U.S. Decennial Census

=== 2010 census ===
As of the census of 2010, there were 781 people, 373 households, and 219 families living in the town. The population density was 10.1 inhabitants per square mile (3.9/km^{2}). There were 2,103 housing units at an average density of 27.1 per square mile (10.5/km^{2}). The racial makeup of the town was 98.1% White, 0.1% Native American, 0.5% Asian, and 1.3% from two or more races. Hispanic or Latino of any race were 0.5% of the population.

There were 373 households, of which 21.2% had children under the age of 18 living with them, 53.1% were married couples living together, 3.8% had a female householder with no husband present, 1.9% had a male householder with no wife present, and 41.3% were non-families. 32.7% of all households were made up of individuals, and 7% had someone living alone who was 65 years of age or older. The average household size was 2.06 and the average family size was 2.62.

The median age in the town was 50 years. 16.4% of residents were under the age of 18; 4% were between the ages of 18 and 24; 18.2% were from 25 to 44; 46.6% were from 45 to 64; and 14.9% were 65 years of age or older. The gender makeup of the town was 52.8% male and 47.2% female.

=== 2000 census ===
As of the census of 2000, there were 399 people, 179 households, and 110 families living in the town. The population density was 5.2 inhabitants per square mile (2.0/km^{2}). There were 1,675 housing units at an average density of 21.6 per square mile (8.3/km^{2}). The racial makeup of the town was 99.00% White, 0.25% Asian, and 0.75% from two or more races. Hispanic or Latino of any race were 0.75% of the population.

There were 179 households, out of which 25.7% had children under the age of 18 living with them, 52.5% were married couples living together, 5.0% had a female householder with no husband present, and 38.5% were non-families. 27.4% of all households were made up of individuals, and 4.5% had someone living alone who was 65 years of age or older. The average household size was 2.23 and the average family size was 2.71.

In the town, the population was spread out, with 20.1% under the age of 18, 7.8% from 18 to 24, 31.6% from 25 to 44, 31.8% from 45 to 64, and 8.8% who were 65 years of age or older. The median age was 40 years. For every 100 females, there were 111.1 males. For every 100 females age 18 and over, there were 112.7 males.

The median income for a household in the town was $45,357, and the median income for a family was $55,938. Males had a median income of $32,500 versus $28,750 for females. The per capita income for the town was $25,608. About 1.9% of families and 7.0% of the population were below the poverty line, including 3.9% of those under age 18 and 6.1% of those age 65 or over.
