= Spaulding Mountain =

Mountain in United States of America

- Location within Maine

Highest point
- Elevation: 4,009 ft (1,222 m)
- Prominence: 591 ft (180 m)
- Listing: New England 4000 footers
- Coordinates: 45°00′11″N 70°20′01″W

Geography
- Location: Franklin County, U.S.
- Topo map: USGS Sugarloaf Mountain

Spaulding Mountain is a mountain located in Franklin County, Maine. Spaulding Mountain is flanked to the northeast by Sugarloaf Mountain, and to the southeast by Mount Abraham.

The northeast and south sides of Spaulding Mountain drain into Rapid Stream, then into the West Branch of the Carrabassett River, the Kennebec River, and into the Gulf of Maine. The west side of Spaulding drains into the South Branch of the Carrabassett River.

The Appalachian Trail, a 2,170 mi (3,490 km) National Scenic Trail from Georgia to Maine, crosses Spaulding, passing 150 ft (46 m) below the summit.

== See also ==
- List of mountains in Maine
