= Carrabassett River =

River in Maine, United States

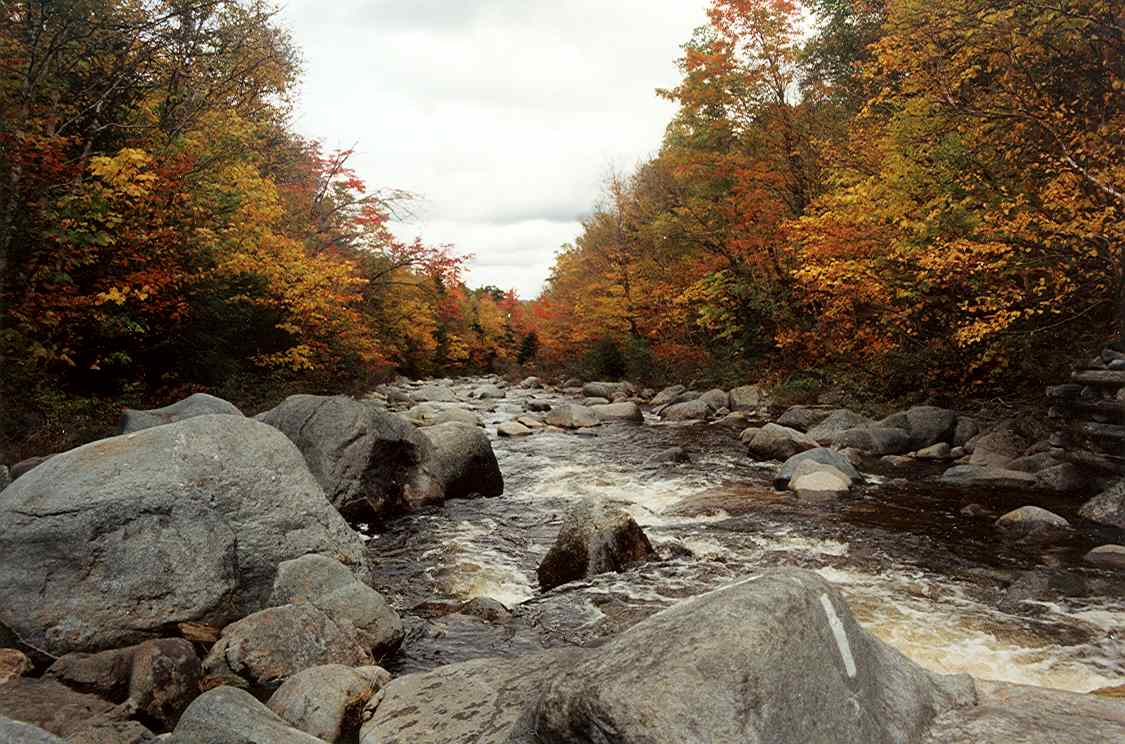
- South Branch Carrabassett River at the AT crossing

Location
- Country: United States

Physical characteristics
- Source
  - location: Maine
  - elevation: 2,720 feet (830 m)
- Mouth
  - location: Kennebec River
  - coordinates: 44°50′56″N 69°52′37″W
  - elevation: 245 feet (75 m)
- Length: 33.8 mi (54.4 km)

The Carrabassett River, a tributary of the Kennebec River, is located in Franklin County and Somerset County, Maine, in the United States. It rises near Sugarloaf Mountain, east of Rangeley Lake, and runs for 33.8 miles (54.4 km), flowing southeast past Kingfield and joining the Kennebec River in the town of Anson.

== Course ==
=== South Branch ===
The South Branch Carrabassett River, 11.9 miles (19.2 km) long, begins in Franklin County at Caribou Pond, fed by small brooks and wetlands between Spaulding Mountain to the east and Mount Redington to the west. From the outflow of Caribou Pond (45°00′32″N 70°21′23″W), the South Branch flows north through Caribou Valley, between Crocker Mountain and Sugarloaf Mountain. The Appalachian Trail crosses the South Branch in Caribou Valley. Near the village of Bigelow, the river turns east, collecting brooks draining Sugarloaf Mountain, known for Sugarloaf ski resort. At Bigelow, the river is bridged by State Routes 16 & 27. Route 16 and the narrow gauge Sandy River and Rangeley Lakes Railroad follow the river from Bigelow downstream to Kingfield.

=== Main stem ===
Near the villages of Records and Carrabassett, in the town of Carrabassett Valley, the South Fork Carrabassett River is joined by Huston Brook, which flows south from the Bigelow Range. Below the confluence the river is simply called the Carrabassett River (there is no North Branch, but there is a West Branch to the south). The railroad enabled logging of the aboriginal spruce forests of the west branch in 1885, and a large steam sawmill was built at Bigelow in 1899 to convert the headwater forests to lumber. The shift to internal combustion transportation began in 1924 when a Carrabassett veneer mill used surplus World War I tanks to move logs out of the woods. The railroad was dismantled between 1926 and 1936.

The Carrabassett River flows southward from the confluence of the South Branch with Huston Brook, passing between Poplar Mountain to the east and Owls Head to the west, receiving Poplar Stream and Hammond Field Brook before entering the town of Kingfield. There it receives Clay Brook, Reed Brook, and Ledge Brook. This part of the Carrabassett River contains many rapids. Just before the village of Kingfield, the West Branch Carrabassett River joins the main Carrabassett River. The river is bridged by State Route 16 and impounded by a small concrete dam in the village of Kingfield. Below the dam the river receives Stanley Stream, then enters Somerset County and the town of New Portland.

After crossing the county line, the Carrabassett River receives the waters of Indian Stream, Bloodsucker Brook, and Taylor Brook, before reaching the village of New Portland. An old suspension bridge called the "Wire Bridge" crosses the river in New Portland. The river then collects Lemon Stream, Dyer Brook, and Newell Brook. In the village of East New Portland another bridge crosses the river. Then the Carrabassett River receives one of its main tributaries, Gilman Stream, followed by the smaller tributaries of Hutchins Brook, Hilton Brook, and Town Farm Brook.

The Carrabassett River passes through the North Anson Gorge in the town of Anson. It collects Mill Stream and Gilbert Brook before reaching the village of North Anson. About a mile below North Anson, the Carrabassett River joins the Kennebec River at an island called Savage Island. The Carrabassett is bridged by U.S. Route 201 and was bridged by the former Kineo Branch of the Maine Central Railroad near the confluence with the Kennebec.
