= West Branch Carrabassett River =

Location
- Country: United States

Physical characteristics
- Source
  - location: Maine
  - elevation: 850 feet (260 m)
- Mouth
  - location: Carrabassett River
  - coordinates: 44°57′40″N 70°09′33″W
  - elevation: 560 feet (170 m)
- Length: 11 miles (18 km)

Basin features
- Progression: Carrabassett River – Kennebec River

The West Branch Carrabassett River is a short tributary of the Carrabassett River in Franklin County, Maine. From the confluence of Quick Stream with a small stream (44°54′02″N 70°16′41″W) in Salem, the river runs 11.1 miles (17.9 km) northeast to its mouth in Kingfield.

== See also ==
- List of rivers of Maine
