= Sugarloaf Mountain (Maine) =

Mountain located in Franklin County, Maine

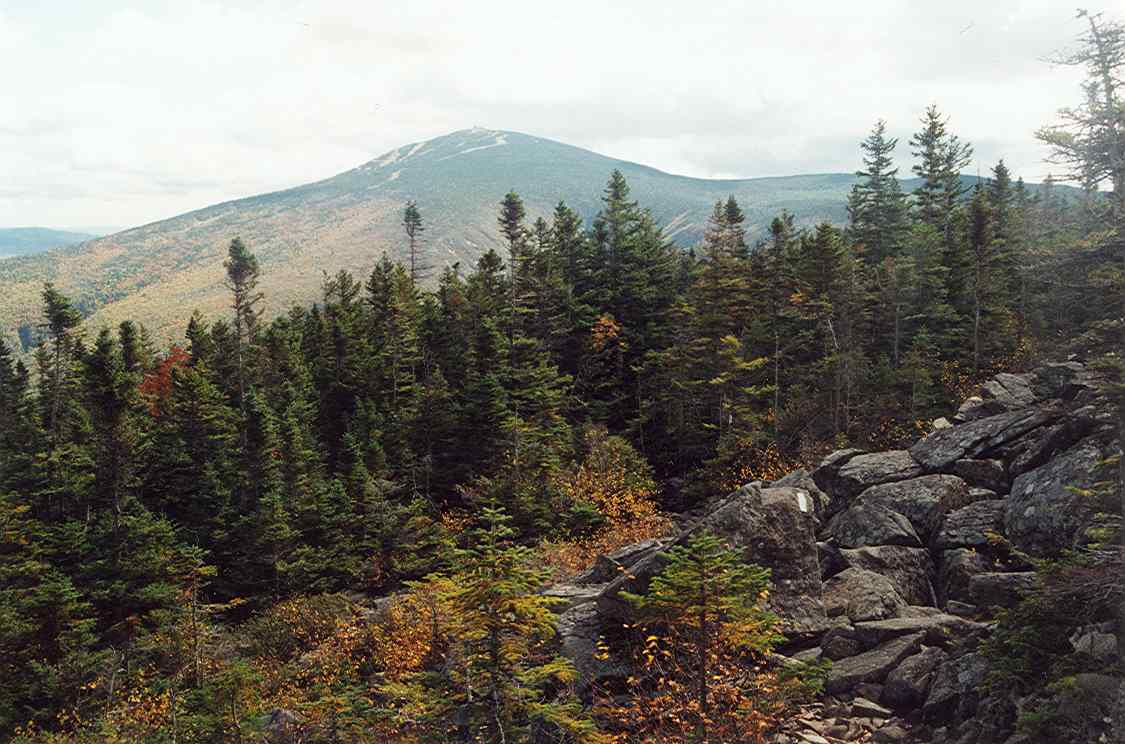
- Sugarloaf Mountain seen from the AT above Crocker Cirque

Highest point
- Elevation: 4,226 ft (1,288 m)
- Prominence: 3,168 ft (966 m)
- Listing: New England 4000 footers; New England Fifty Finest #6
- Coordinates: 45°01′54″N 70°18′48″W

Geography
- Location within Maine
- Location: Franklin County, Maine, U.S.
- Parent range: Rangeley-Stratton
- Topo map: USGS Sugarloaf Mountain

Sugarloaf Mountain is a ski mountain located in Carrabassett Valley, Franklin County, Maine. It is the third highest peak in the state, after Mount Katahdin's Baxter and Hamlin peaks. Sugarloaf is flanked to the south by Spaulding Mountain.

The northeast and west sides of Sugarloaf drain into the South Branch of the Carrabassett River, which flows into the Kennebec River, and into the Gulf of Maine. The southeast side of Sugarloaf drains into Rapid Stream, then into the West Branch of the Carrabassett River.

The Appalachian Trail (AT), a 2,170 mi (3,490 km) National Scenic Trail from Georgia to Maine, passes within a mile of the summit, skirting the peak to the west, and the summit is reached by a 0.6 mi (0.97 km) side trail. This side trail, and a trail down the east side of Sugarloaf, were originally part of the AT, which has been relocated down the north side of the mountain to the west of the ski slopes. Sugarloaf, a major ski resort is located on the north side of the mountain.

== Gallery ==
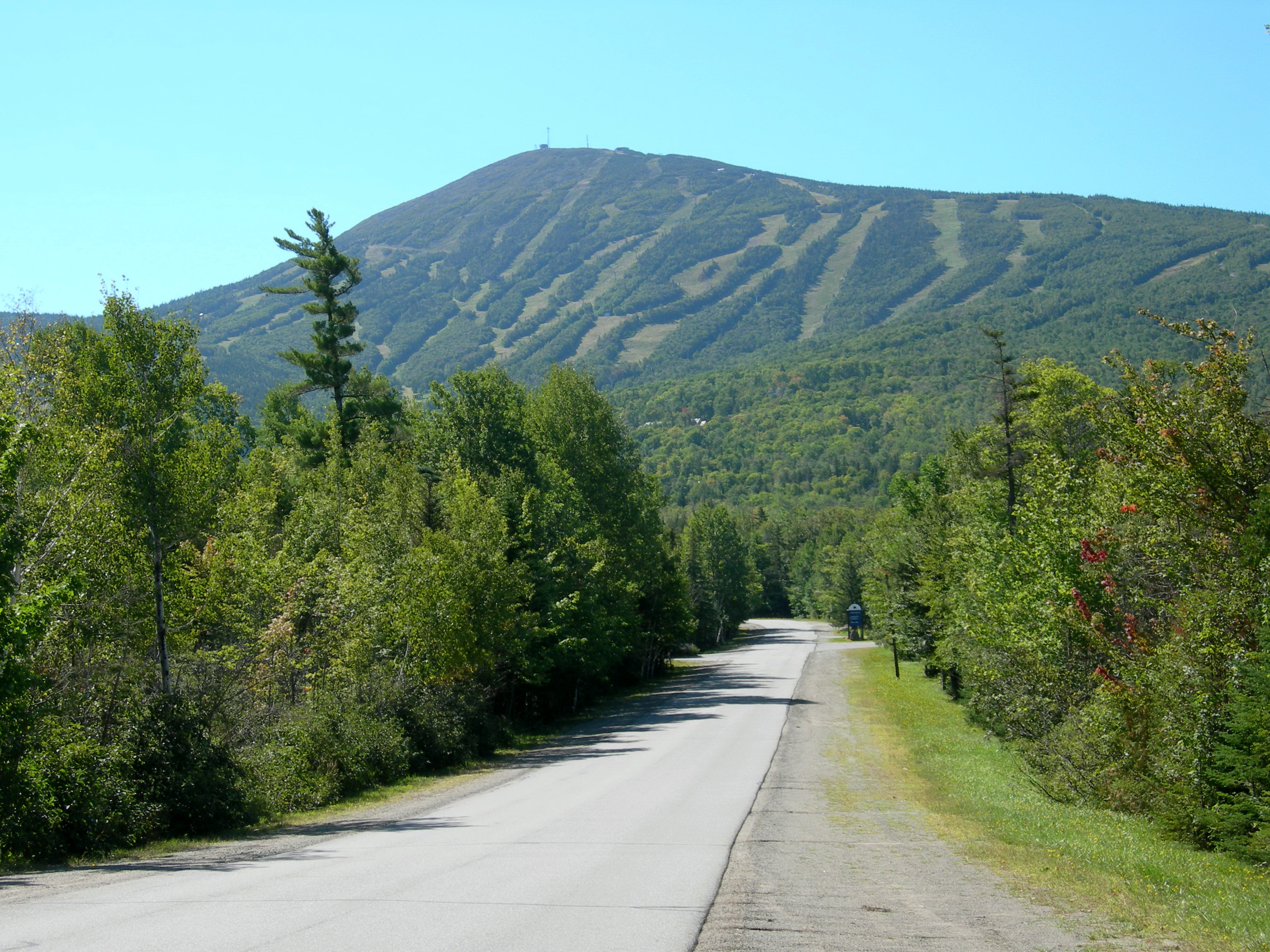
Sugarloaf Mountain ski runs

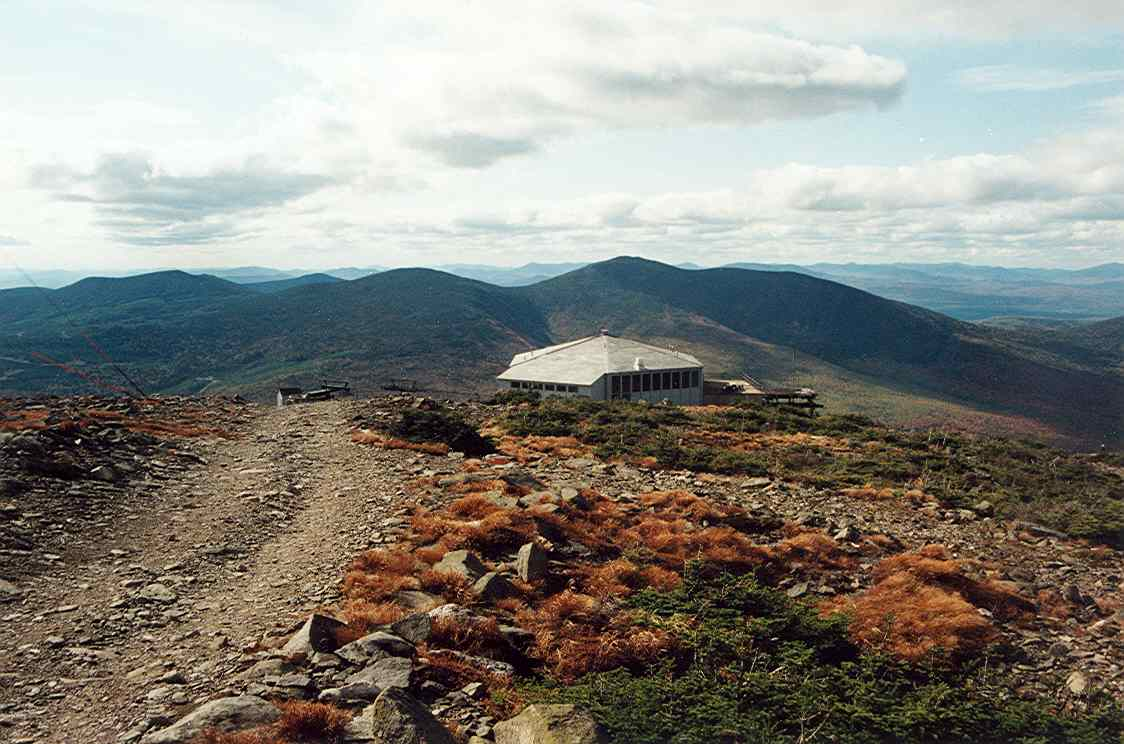
View from Sugarloaf summit

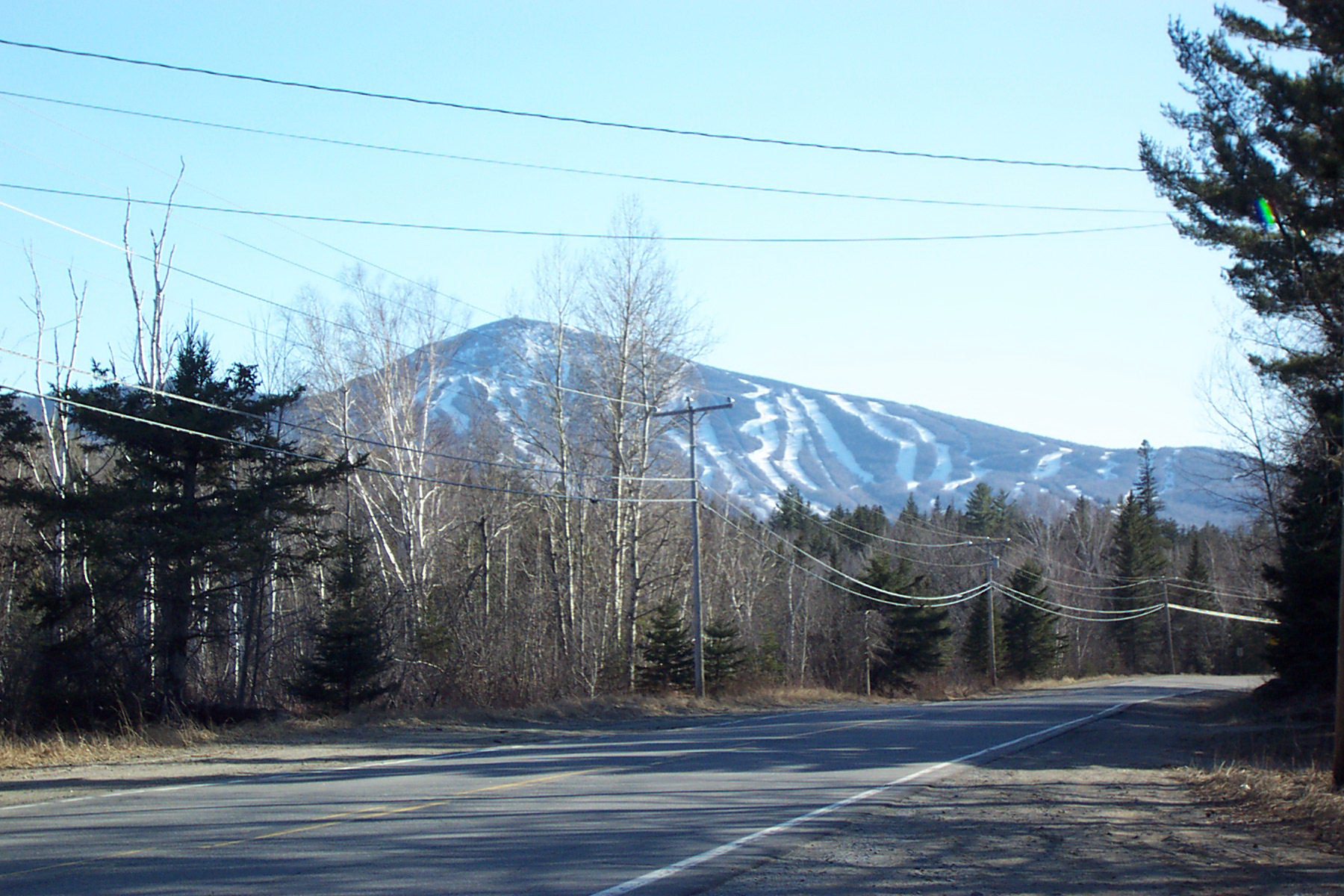
Sugarloaf Mountain seen from Routes 16 and 27

== See also ==
- List of mountains in Maine
