= Saddleback Mountain (Rangeley, Maine) =

Mountain in Maine, United States of America

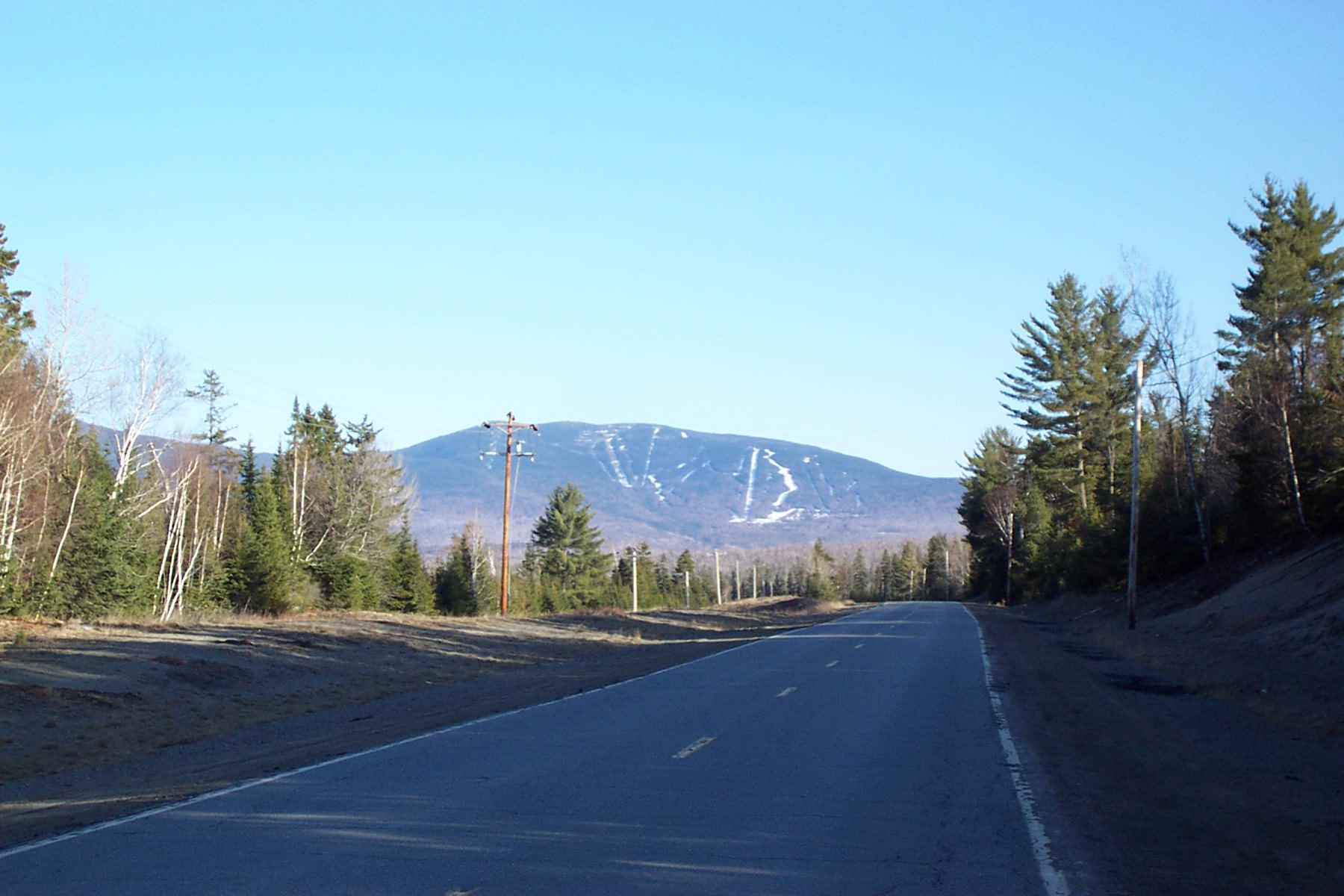
- As seen from State Route 16

Highest point
- Elevation: 4,121 ft (1,256 m)
- Prominence: 2,448 ft (746 m)
- Listing: New England 4000 footers #19 New England Fifty Finest
- Coordinates: 44°56′12″N 70°30′11″W

Geography
- Location within Maine
- Location: Franklin County, Maine, U.S.
- Topo map: USGS Saddleback Mountain

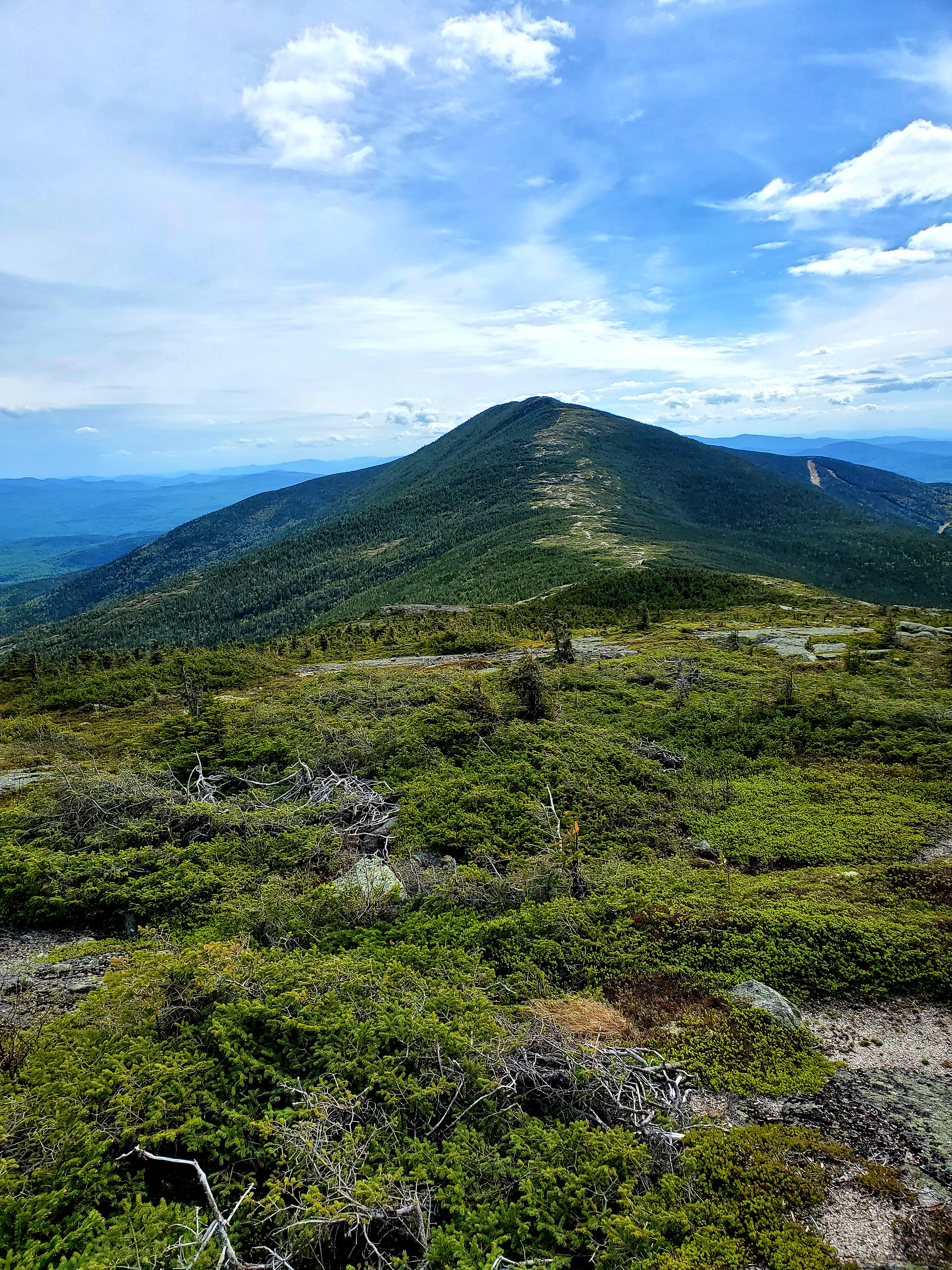
View of Saddleback Mountain as seen from the Horn of Saddleback

Saddleback Mountain is a mountain located in Sandy River Plantation, Franklin County, Maine, near the resort town of Rangeley. Saddleback is one of the highest mountains in the State of Maine, and one of the fourteen with more than 2,000 ft (610 m) of topographic prominence. The mountain is the site of Saddleback ski resort.

Saddleback is flanked to the northeast by Saddleback Horn. The mountain rock is primarily a form of granodiorite known as the Redington pluton that is estimated to have formed roughly 410 million years ago, while the soil atop it is largely till with a thickness of 10 feet (3.0 m) or less.

The northwest side of Saddleback drains into Saddleback Lake, then into Redington Stream, the South Branch of the Dead River, the Kennebec River, and into the Gulf of Maine. The southeast side of Saddleback drains into Winship and Conant Streams, then Orbeton Stream, and the Sandy River, another tributary of the Kennebec. The southwest end of Saddleback drains into Cascade Stream, then into Rangeley Lake, Rangeley River, Mooselookmeguntic Lake, Upper and Lower Richardson Lakes, Rapid River, Umbagog Lake, and the Androscoggin River, which drains into Merrymeeting Bay, the estuary of the Kennebec River.

The Appalachian Trail, a 2,170 mi (3,490 km) National Scenic Trail from Georgia to Maine, runs along the ridge of Saddleback, crossing the summit. Saddleback Maine, a ski area, is located on the north face of the mountain.

Ranging from beginner trails to advanced and expert trails, the mountain contains 66 ski trails along with 5 ski lifts.

== See also ==
- List of mountains in Maine
