= Rangeley =

Rangeley may refer to:

== Places in the United States ==
- Rangeley, Maine, a town
  - Rangeley (CDP), Maine, the primary village in the town
- Rangeley Lake, a large lake in western Maine
- Rangeley River, the outlet of Rangeley Lake
- Rangeley Plantation, Maine, a minor civil division

== People ==
- Charles Rangeley-Wilson, British author
- Walter Rangeley (1903–1982), English athlete
- William H. J. Rangeley (1910–1958), British anthropologist
