= Rangeley Lake State Park =

State park in Franklin County, Maine

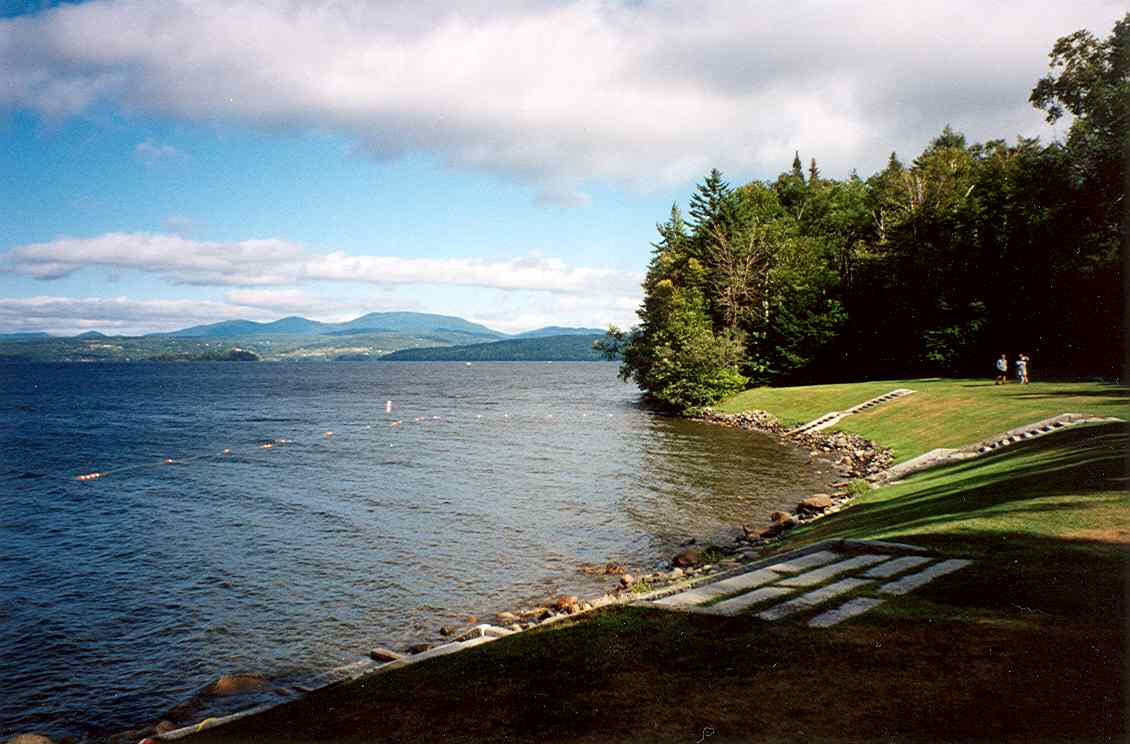

- Location within Maine
- Interactive map of Rangeley Lake State Park
- Location: Rangeley and Rangeley Plantation, Maine, United States
- Coordinates: 44°56′43″N 70°41′38″W
- Area: 870 acres (350 ha)
- Elevation: 1,519 ft (463 m)
- Established: 1960
- Administrator: Maine Department of Agriculture, Conservation and Forestry
- Website: Official website
- Maine State Parks

Rangeley Lake State Park is a public recreation area occupying 870 acres (350 ha) on the southern shore of Rangeley Lake in Franklin County, Maine. The state park is partly in the town of Rangeley and partly in Rangeley Plantation. It is managed by the Maine Department of Agriculture, Conservation and Forestry.

The park is one of five Maine State Parks that were in the path of totality for the 2024 solar eclipse, with 2 minutes and 19 seconds of totality.

== History ==
The park was created in 1960 when the Bureau of Parks and Lands made three acquisitions totaling 718 acres (291 ha). Oxford County and international paper companies donated half of the park property. A 29-acre (12 ha) parcel was added to the park in 2009 with the assistance of the Rangeley Lakes Heritage Trust. The acquisition, which cost $595,000.00, was made using funds from the Land for Maine's Future program.

== Activities and amenities ==
The park offers picnicking, a 50-site campground, swimming beach, hiking trails, and docks and launch ramp for motorized boating. The lake's 6,000 acres (2,400 ha) house landlocked salmon and brook trout.
