= Saddleback Maine =

Ski area in Sandy River Plantation, Maine

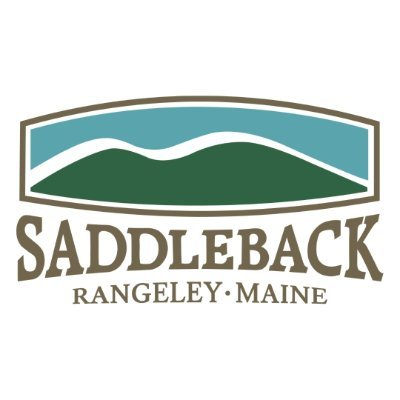

- Interactive map of Saddleback Maine
- Location: Sandy River Plantation, Maine, U.S.
- Mountain: Saddleback Mountain
- Nearest city: Farmington, Maine
- Coordinates: 44°56′12″N 070°30′11″W
- Status: Operating
- Vertical: 2,000 feet (610 m)
- Top elevation: 4,120 feet (1,260 m)
- Base elevation: 2,120 feet (650 m)
- Skiable area: 600 acres (2.4 km^{2})
- Trails: 68
- Longest run: 1.86 miles (2.99 km) Hudson Highway
- Lift system: 6 (4 quad lifts, 1 t-bar, and 1 moving-carpet).
- Terrain parks: 2 (Wheeler Slope, Gee Whiz)
- Snowfall: 225 inches (5,700 mm) (annual)
- Website: www.saddlebackmaine.com

Saddleback Maine is a ski resort located in Sandy River Plantation, near Rangeley, Maine, on the northwestern slopes of Saddleback Mountain. Saddleback Mountain was sold to the Arctaris Impact Fund and reopened on December 15, 2020, after 5 years of being closed.

All the trails at Saddleback are named after famous fishing flies created in Rangeley by anglers Carrie Stevens, Bud Wilcox, and Dick Frost. Some of these fly names include Supervisor, Peachy's Peril, Royal Tiger, and America. All of the chairlifts at Saddleback are named after popular fly fishing rivers, such as the Rangeley River, South Branch (of the Dead River), and the Magalloway River.

It was awarded the “Best in Maine” ski resort for 2022, 2023 and 2024 by Down East Magazine. Updates since the Arctaris Impact Fund purchase include RFID scanners at the new Rangeley quad lift, a new mid-mountain lodge, EV charging stations, A-Frame condominiums, repaved mountain road, high-speed residential internet, on-mountain employee housing, and mountain biking trails.

Future plans include the addition of a solar farm.

== Terrain ==
Saddleback's terrain consists of 38% Beginner trails (25 trails), 29% Intermediate trails (19 trails) and 33% Advance and Expert trails (22 trails). There are also six (6) ski lifts, which include two, fixed grip quads, a high-speed detachable quad, a t-bar, rope tow, and moving carpet.

The mountain is broken up into three sections, the upper, middle, and lower sections, which consist of terrain from double black diamond (hardest) to green circle (easiest). Each section of the mountain is serviced by a variety of lifts.

The lower mountain consists of 18 beginner trails, and is serviced by the South Branch Quad, and the Sandy Rope Tow. The terrain is very mild and flat, and most of it is located below the base lodge which helps to keep skier traffic to a minimum. Saddleback sells a separate ski ticket on certain weekends and holidays, which is only good for the South Branch Quad. This allows for the ski area to reduce the price of the ticket because it only allows access to a limited amount of terrain. Since the new ownership, eleven new trails have been cut in this area and two quad chairlifts has been installed.

The middle mountain consists mostly of intermediate terrain, with a few expert trails thrown in. The terrain is serviced by the Rangeley high speed quad and the Cupsuptic T-Bar. One beginner trail Hudson Highway (a former jeep trail) runs from the top of the Rangeley lift and Cupsuptic to the base area. This section of the mountain consist of notable trails such as Grey Ghost, which has many head walls, flats, and curves, making it a fun and popular trail. Blue Devil is another popular trail because of its classic New England style, which is very curvy and narrow to protect the snow on the trail from the wind. Since the new ownership, four new trails have been cut in this area.

The upper mountain, also referred to as "The Kennebago Steeps, consisting of mostly advanced and expert trails". It is serviced solely by the Kennebago Quad chairlift, which was installed in the summer of 2008 to replace the Kennebago T-Bar. It has such famous trails as Muleskinner, Intimidator, Governor, and Nightmare Glades. It also has two intermediate trails, Tri-Color, which runs from the summit, and America, which is the continuation of the former jeep trail. Since the new ownership, seven new trails have been cut in this area. In 2013, Saddleback cut an extensive glade trail named "Casablanca", and skiers and riders have travelled to the mountain to experience this steep trail.

== History ==
=== The 1990s ===
Through the 1990s, the ski resort's prior owner, Donald Breen, engaged in a protracted dispute with conservation advocates over the Appalachian Trail corridor, which runs across the ridge at the top of the ski resort. Breen settled the dispute with the National Park Service, which manages the trail, in 2000, and in the fall of 2003, Breen sold most of the resort to the Berry family, for $7.5 million.

=== The 2000s: ownership by the Berry Family ===
The Berry family built a new base lodge, six new trails, and a new quad chairlift (the resort's first new chairlift in 30 years) in 2004.

In 2007, the Maine Land Use Regulation Commission approved Saddleback's 10-year development plan, which calls for a major expansion of lifts, trails, vacation homes, and other facilities.

In the summer of 2008, Doppelmayr constructed a fixed grip quad to replace the Kennebago t-bar at the top of the ski area, along with new trails. The Kennebago quad provided easy and faster access to the high-elevation advanced terrain with views of the lakes and Western Maine Mountains.

In 2009 a new yurt was built at the base of the Kennebego lift. It is equipped with heat, power, and composting toilets.

A 40-acre (160,000 m^{2}) glade area, Casablanca, was cut between Muleskinner and Black Beauty for the 2009–10 ski season.

In 2010, two new Pisten Bully Snow Groomers were added to the mountain's fleet of groomers.

During the summer of 2010 a new glade area was cut between Jane Craig and Professor. This section is unnamed.

Since the purchase in 2004, terrain has been increased by over 44%, snowmaking increased to over 85%, the grooming fleet has been replaced, and the Rangeley Chair has been upgraded and lengthened so it can be easily accessible from the base lodge. A new Lodge has been built, along with three new condominium complexes, and the mountain Saddleback's real estate office known as Saddleback Village.

=== The 2010s: new ownership ===
In December 2012, The Berrys announced that Saddleback Mountain was for sale. Of 400 acres of land, the mountain was placed on the market for $12 million, that include ski trails, lifts, the base loge and the surrounding 121 condominium units. However, the family still hopes to retain 7,600 undeveloped acres around the ski area. Later, Saddleback entered into a lease/purchase agreement for Oquossoc Cove Marina.

=== Seasonal closing ===
During the summer of 2015, the Saddleback owner, Mark Berry, announced in a release that the ski resort would not open for the 2015–2016 season unless the outdated and slow Rangeley double (GMD Mueller) was replaced; costing them nearly $3 million. The 4,717' double chairlift was inadequate for the capacity needs of the resort. Berry stated that "...we’ve been actively seeking the necessary financing to replace the chairlift, however, time is running out.

We only have a few weeks to make this work. In order to open this winter, we need to order the new lift by early August."

As such, the mountain's future plunged into one of uncertainty. As the year progressed into 2016, Saddleback officials said they were not opening for February school vacation week, keeping its patrons concerned and sending the future of the mountain into uncertainty. Though not yet declared by Saddleback, Joey Morton, a local from Rangeley "doubted the mountain will open at all this winter season." Furthermore, the lack of snow and the uncertainty of Saddleback's opening affected the local businesses and the town of Rangeley.

=== Majella ownership ===
Since the Berry family was not able to replace the Rangeley in 2014 and 2015, the mountain and lifts sat idle. On June 28, 2017, it was announced that the Australian Majella Group had an agreement to purchase Saddleback from the Berry family. The Majella Group had contacted Doppelmayr USA, who had already begun the survey, engineering, and design work. It was initially announced that a fixed grip quad would replace Rangeley, while the Cupsuptic T-Bar would be replaced with a new wind resistant version. However, with the arrest of Majella Group CEO Sebastian Monsour in 2018 on fraud in Australia, the mountain's future plunged again into uncertainty. Critics also questioned Monsour's intentions after he was quoted in Maine news reports as saying he was motivated by the EB-5 program that offers foreigners permanent residency if they invest in certain U.S. real estate projects.

=== Arctaris Impact Fund offer ===
In March 2019, the Arctaris Impact Fund based in Boston made an undisclosed offer to purchase Saddleback Mountain. They also pledged between $25 million and $30 million after the sale to help revitalize the mountain The news of an offer was sent out through an email by Andy Shepard, former CEO of the Outdoor Sports Institute and Tom Federle, a Portland attorney.

Shepard has stated that "[w]e have been very impressed with their commitment and capacity to not only buy the mountain, but doing so with a long term view to make the mountain successful." He further told the press that this investment firm's offer is the "real deal and that [he's] hopeful for the Berry family and for the people of western Maine that [we] can get a deal done." The two have strong connections to the region and Saddleback. Federle owns a Saddleback condo and Shepard has strong interest in preserving the mountain and its role in the economy of the region.

=== Arctaris Impact Fund purchase ===
After seven months of negotiations, the Berry family agreed to sell the ski resort to Arctaris Impact Fund. The new general manager of Saddleback Mountain, Andy Shepard announced he hopes to reopen the mountain for the 2020–2021 season, sometime between Thanksgiving and Christmas of 2020. The mountain has been closed since the 2014–2015 season. On January 31, 2020, Saddleback was officially sold to Arctaris Impact Fund. In February, it was announced that Rangeley would be replaced by a new high speed quad constructed by Doppelmayr, accompanied by lodge upgrades, new snowmaking, and a fair ticket pricing approach. On March 18, the new Saddleback Mountain website went live, which allowed for season pass and locker sales, as well as a section detailing the investments for the 2020–2021 season. During February, March, and April 2020, the COVID-19 pandemic caused massive disruption to the ski industry and global economy, however, Saddleback announced that their investments were moving forward as expected, with the opening date scheduled for December 15, 2020. The ski area officially reopened to the public on December 15, 2020.

== Saddleback reborn ==
=== First season back ===
After Saddleback's successful first season operating since 2015, they surpassed their expected skier visit goal of 70,000 people. Throughout the season, Andy Shepard, the General Manager, released plans for next season such as mountain biking trails, a new Cupsuptic T-Bar, solar farm, and a mid-mountain lodge set to be located at the top of the Rangeley quad. Saddleback had released a plan to open in late November, however the date revised to December 15, due to delays in completing the new Rangeley quad.

== Lifts ==
Saddleback has six lifts.

Name	Type	Builder	Built	Vertical (feet)	Length (feet)	Photos
Rangeley	High Speed Quad	Doppelmayr USA	2020	1176	4569	
Kennebago	Fixed Grip Quad	Doppelmayr USA	2008	960	2709	Summit of the Kennebago Quad.
South Branch	Fixed Grip Quad	Doppelmayr USA	2004	346	2760	
Sandy	Fixed Grip Quad	Partek	2022	227	1397	
Cupsuptic	T-Bar	Doppelmayr USA	2021	662	2522	
Molly Chunkamunk	Magic Carpet	SunKid	2021			

== Trail Maps ==
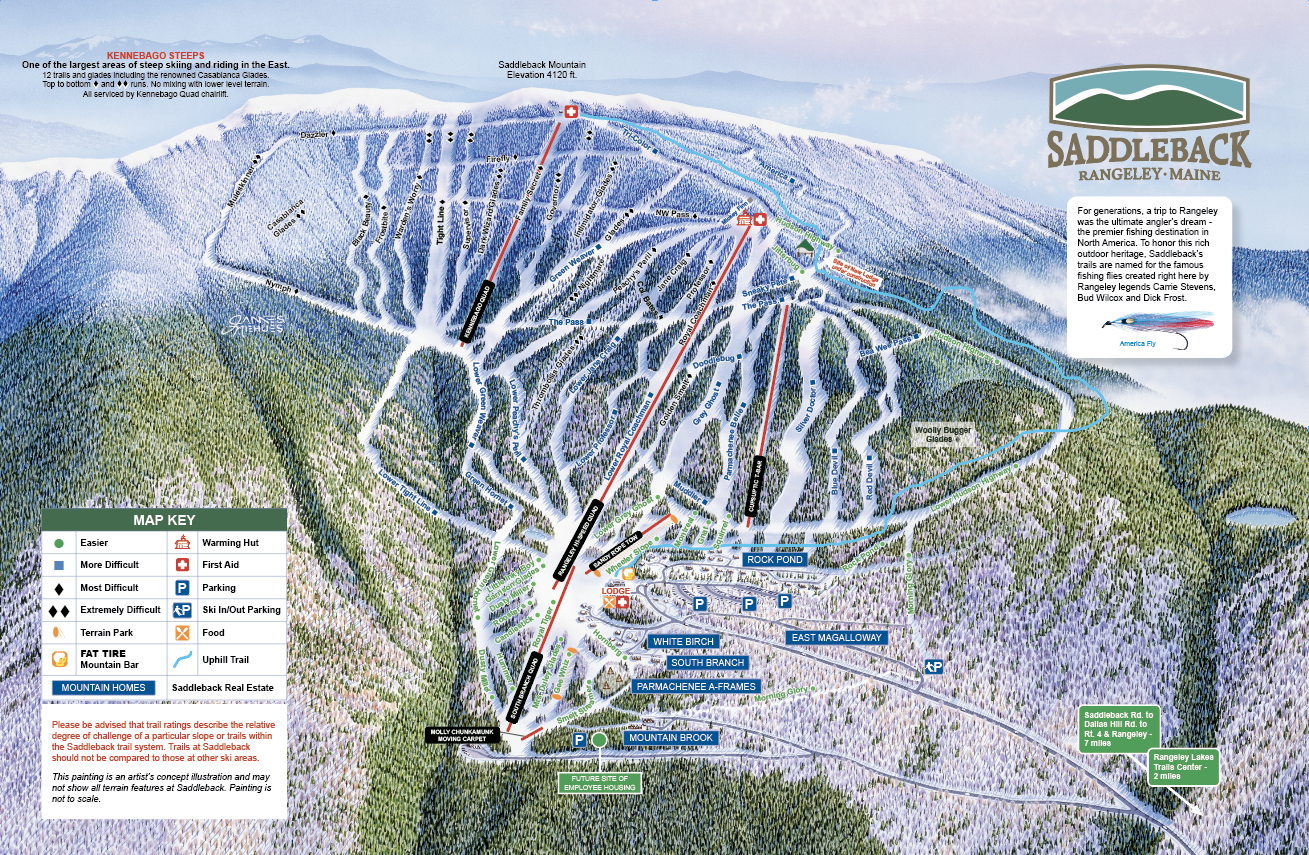

Last Updated: 1/29/22

== Gallery ==
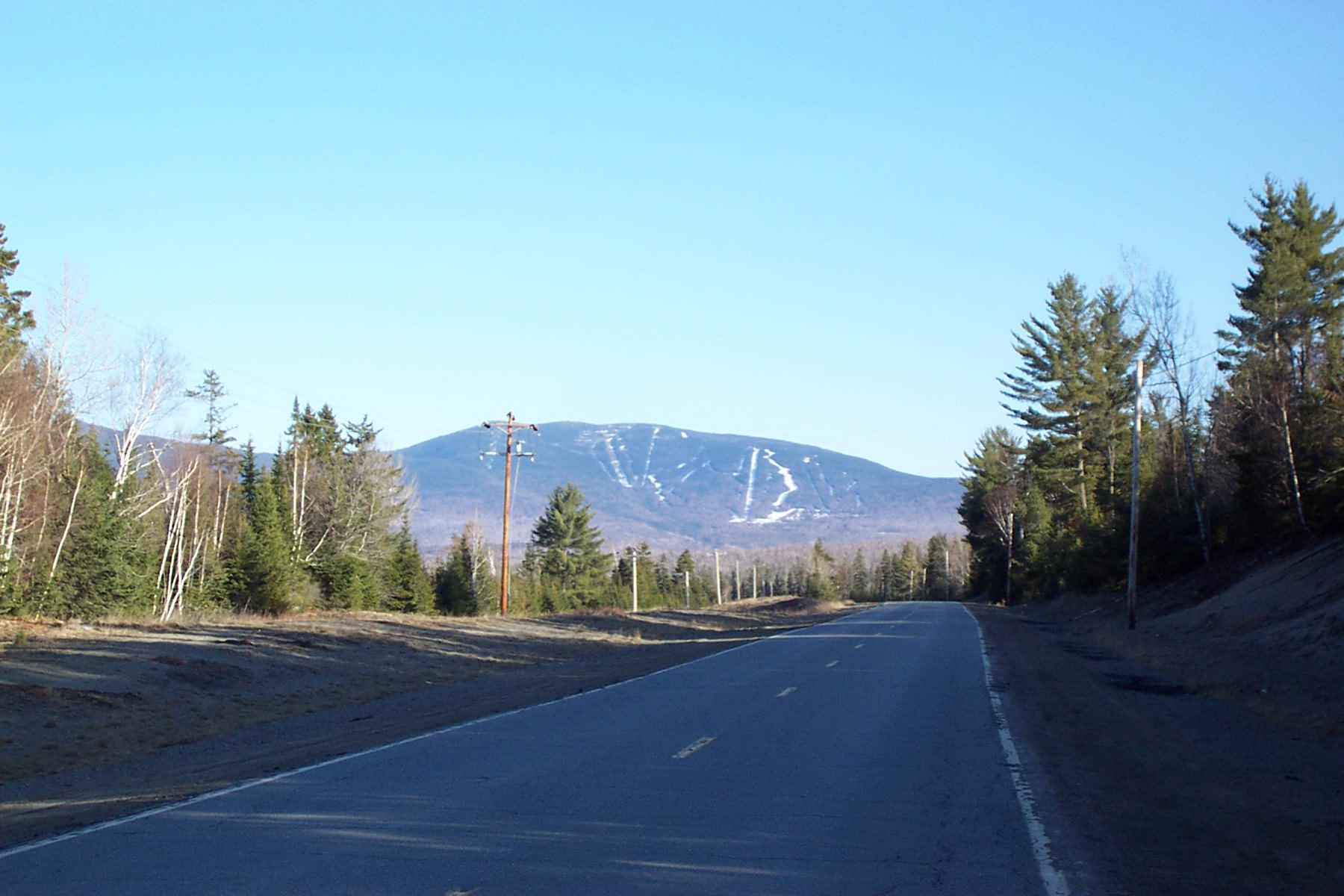
Saddleback Maine seen from Maine State Route 16

Inside the new base lodge.

Entering the lower part of the Intimidator Glades.

== Sources ==
- http://www.newenglandskihistory.com/Maine/saddleback.php
- http://bangordailynews.com/2012/12/15/outdoors/saddleback-mountain-ski-resort-up-for-sale/
