= List of nature centers in Maine =

This is a list of nature centers and environmental education centers in the state of Maine.

To use the sortable tables: click on the icons at the top of each column to sort that column in alphabetical order; click again for reverse alphabetical order.

Name	Location	County	Summary
Augusta Nature Education Center	Augusta	Kennebec	175 acres with 5 miles of trails, operated by the Augusta Nature Club
Beachcombers’ Rest Nature Center	Bristol	Lincoln	website, operated seasonally by the Pemaquid Watershed Association at Pemaquid Beach Park
Birdsacre: Stanwood Wildlife Sanctuary	Ellsworth	Hancock	200-acre preserve, 19th-century historic house museum and modern nature center
Borestone Mountain Audubon Sanctuary	Monson	Piscataquis	website, over 1,600 acres, center open seasonally, operated by Maine Audubon
East Point Audubon Sanctuary	Biddeford	York	website, A short walk provides views of Saco Bay and the Gulf of Maine, operated by Maine Audubon
The Ecology School	Saco	York	Residential and traveling environmental education programs
Ferry Beach State Park	Saco	York	website, 127 acres
Fields Pond Audubon Center	Holden	Penobscot	website, 192 acres, operated by Maine Audubon
Gilsland Farm Audubon Center	Falmouth	Cumberland	website, 65 acres, operated by Maine Audubon
Hamilton Audubon Sanctuary	West Bath	Sagadahoc	website, 93 acres with 2.75 miles of trails, operated by Maine Audubon
Hidden Valley Nature Center	Jefferson	Lincoln	website, over 1,000 acres with 25 miles of trails, operated by the Midcoast Conservancy
Hog Island	Bremen	Lincoln	330 acres, plus a 30-acre mainland parcel to comprise Todd Wildlife Sanctuary, features Audubon Camp in Maine operated by the National Audubon Society
Josephine Newman Audubon Sanctuary	Georgetown	Sagadahoc	website, 119 acres, operated by Maine Audubon
Maine Wildlife Park	Gray	Cumberland	website, 65 acres, state-operated zoo of native wildlife, trails, environmental education programs
Mast Landing Audubon Sanctuary	Freeport	Cumberland	https://www.maineaudubon.org/visit/mast-landing/ website], 140 acres along the Harraseeket River estuary, operated by Maine Audubon
Merryspring Nature Center	Camden	Knox	website, 66-acre park, garden and education center in Camden and Rockport
Mount Blue State Park Nature Center	Weld	Franklin	About 8,000 acres in two sections separated by Webb Lake
Project Puffin Visitor Center	Rockland	Knox	Seabird conservation work of the National Audubon Society, live video feed from Seal Island National Wildlife Refuge
Scarborough Marsh Audubon Center	Scarborough	Cumberland	website, operated by Maine Audubon, programs and access to the state-owned 3,100-acre Scarborough Marsh
Sebago Lake Ecology Center	Standish	Cumberland	website, operated by the Portland Water District, 1,700-acre Sebago Lake Land Reserve
Stephen Phillips Memorial Preserve	Mooselookmeguntic Lake	Franklin	6,000 acres of lake, islands and shoreline with a large number of wilderness campsites
Viles Arboretum	Augusta	Kennebec	224 acres, botanical garden and arboretum, visitor center and environmental education programs
Wells National Estuarine Research Reserve	Wells	York	2,250 acres, operated by the Wells Reserve and the Laudholm Trust
