= Mooselookmeguntic, Maine =

- Populated place
- Location within Maine Location within the United States
- Coordinates: 44°57′48″N 70°47′34″W
- Country: United States
- State: Maine
- County: Franklin
- Town: Rangeley
- Elevation: 1,480 ft (450 m)
- Time zone: UTC-5 (Eastern (EST))
  - Summer (DST): UTC-4 (EDT)
- ZIP Code: 04964 (Oquossoc)
- GNIS feature ID: 571650

Mooselookmeguntic (/muːslʊkmiɡʌntɪk/) is a populated place in Franklin County, Maine, United States. It is located in the western part of the town of Rangeley, at the northern end of Maine State Route 4, 1 mile (1.6 km) west of Oquossoc. The community is on the east shore of the north end of Mooselookmeguntic Lake, where it merges with Cupsuptic Lake. It is part of the Rangeley Lakes region of northwestern Maine.

Mooselookmeguntic is one of the longest single-word, unhyphenated place names in the United States recognized by the U.S. Board on Geographic Names. At 17 characters, it is tied with Kleinfeltersville, Pennsylvania.

== Geology of Mooselookmeguntic ==
A publication of the Maine Geological Survey describes some of the bedrock just south of Lake Mooselookmeguntic as:

"Mooselookmeguntic pluton and related bodies. Primarily a medium-grained, two-mica adamellite. Some pegmatite."
