= M57 =

M57 or M-57 may refer to:

== Transport ==
- M-57 (Michigan highway), a state highway in Michigan
- M57 motorway, a motorway in England
- M57 (Cape Town), a Metropolitan Route in Cape Town, South Africa
- M57 (Johannesburg), a Metropolitan Route in Johannesburg, South Africa
- M57, a New York City Bus route in Manhattan

== Weapons ==
- M57, variant of the MGM-140 ATACMS missile
- Halcón ML-57, an Argentine submachine gun
- TT pistol (Yugoslavian m57), a Yugoslavian-produced TT-33 pistol model, with an added safety
- Zastava M57, pistol
- M57 mortar, Yugoslavian 60mm Mortar

== Other ==
- BMW M57, a 1998 diesel automobile engine
- Miles M.57 Aerovan, a 1945 British short-range, low-cost transport
- Messier 57 (M57), a planetary nebula also known as the Ring Nebula
- Rangeley Lake Seaplane Base (FAA LID: M57)
