= Stephen A. Bean Municipal Airport =

Airport in Maine, United States

- IATA: none; ICAO: none; FAA LID: 8B0

Summary
- Airport type: Public
- Owner: Town of Rangeley
- Serves: Rangeley, Maine
- Elevation AMSL: 1,825 ft (556 m)
- Coordinates: 44°59′31″N 070°39′53″W

Map
- Location of airport in Maine 8B0 (the United States)

Runways
Direction	Length		Surface
Direction	ft	m	Surface
14/32	3,201	976	Asphalt

Statistics (2010)
- Aircraft operations: 12,350
- Based aircraft: 6
- Source: Federal Aviation Administration

Stephen A. Bean Municipal Airport (FAA LID: 8B0) is a town owned, public use airport located two nautical miles (4 km) northwest of the central business district of Rangeley, a town in Franklin County, Maine, United States. It is included in the National Plan of Integrated Airport Systems for 2011–2015, which categorized it as a general aviation facility.

== Facilities and aircraft ==
Stephen A. Bean Municipal Airport covers an area of 125 acres (51 ha) at an elevation of 1,825 feet (556 m) above mean sea level. It has one runway designated 14/32 with an asphalt surface measuring 3,201 by 75 feet (976 x 23 m).

The airport is named after the late Stephen A. Bean, who ran a flight school, and taught seaplane flying in the town of Rangeley, Maine. Steven died in a plane crash in December, 2000.

For the 12-month period ending August 16, 2010, the airport had 12,350 aircraft operations, an average of 33 per day: 97% general aviation, 2% military, and <1% air taxi. At that time there were 6 aircraft based at this airport: 100% single-engine.

Instrument Approach Procedures:

- RNAV (GPS)-D (PDF), effective 29 Oct 2026 (Area navigation / GPS)
- NDB-A (PDF), effective 29 Oct 2026 (Non-directional beacon)

== See also ==
- List of airports in Maine
- Rangeley Lake Seaplane Base at 44°57′12″N 070°39′47″W
