= Sandy River Plantation, Maine =

- Plantation
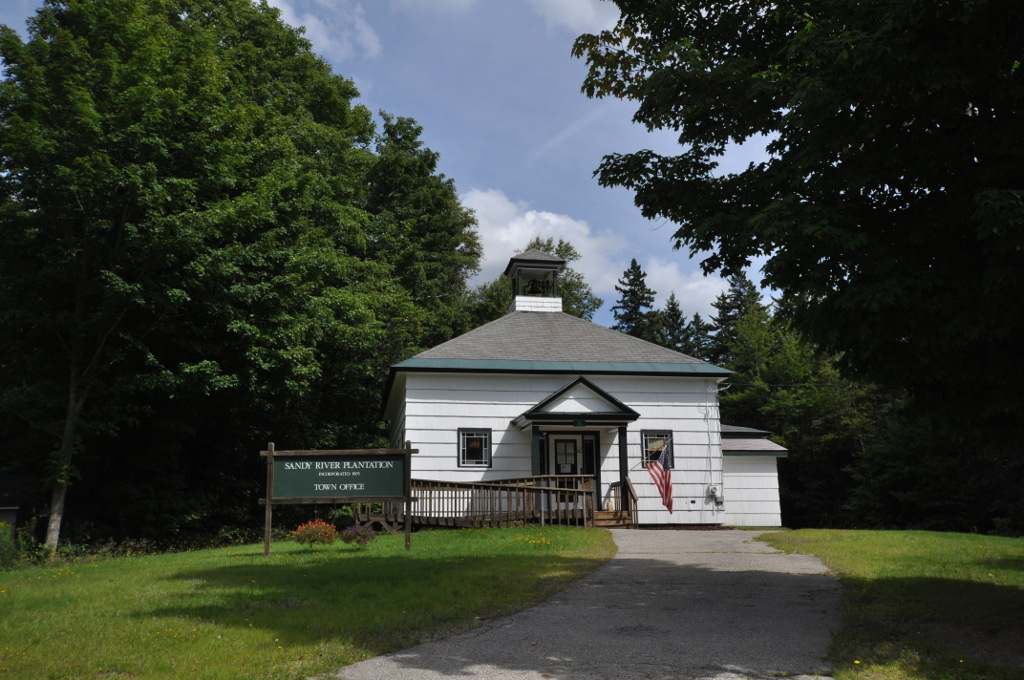
- Sandy River Plantation Town Offices

- Seal

- Location within Maine Location within the United States
- Coordinates: 44°54′26″N 70°34′45″W
- Country: United States
- State: Maine
- County: Franklin

Area
  - Total: 35 sq mi (91 km^{2})
  - Land: 34 sq mi (88 km^{2})
  - Water: 1.2 sq mi (3.1 km^{2})
- Elevation: 2,270 ft (690 m)

Population (2020)
  - Total: 128
  - Density: 3.8/sq mi (1.5/km^{2})
- Time zone: UTC-5 (Eastern (EST))
  - Summer (DST): UTC-4 (EDT)
- ZIP code: 04970
- Area code: 207
- FIPS code: 23-65655
- GNIS feature ID: 582711
- Website: www.sandyriverplantation.gov

Sandy River Plantation is a plantation in Franklin County, Maine, United States. The population was 128 at the 2020 census. It is home to the popular Saddleback Mountain Ski Resort and the Rangeley Lakes Nordic Trail Center (although visitors must drive through Dallas Plantation to reach it).

== Geography ==
According to the United States Census Bureau, the plantation has a total area of 35.3 square miles (91 km^{2}), of which 34.1 square miles (88 km^{2}) is land and 1.2 square miles (3.1 km^{2}) (3.29%) is water. The plantation is home to the Sandy River Ponds, which serve as the source of the Sandy River. The Appalachian Trail crosses through the plantation, where it passes over Saddleback Mountain.

== Demographics ==
Historical population
| Census | Pop. | Note | %± |
|---|---|---|---|
| 1870 | 111 | | — |
| 1880 | 50 | | −55.0% |
| 1890 | 45 | | −10.0% |
| 1900 | 21 | | −53.3% |
| 1910 | 78 | | 271.4% |
| 1920 | 97 | | 24.4% |
| 1930 | 79 | | −18.6% |
| 1940 | 88 | | 11.4% |
| 1950 | 55 | | −37.5% |
| 1960 | 54 | | −1.8% |
| 1970 | 73 | | 35.2% |
| 1980 | 50 | | −31.5% |
| 1990 | 64 | | 28.0% |
| 2000 | 93 | | 45.3% |
| 2010 | 133 | | 43.0% |
| 2020 | 128 | | −3.8% |
U.S. Decennial Census

As of the census of 2000, there were 93 people, 40 households, and 27 families residing in the plantation. The population density was 2.7 inhabitants per square mile (1.0/km^{2}). There were 275 housing units at an average density of 8.1 per square mile (3.1/km^{2}). The racial makeup of the plantation was 98.92% White and 1.08% Asian.

There were 40 households, out of which 30.0% had children under the age of 18 living with them, 47.5% were married couples living together, 12.5% had a female householder with no husband present, and 32.5% were non-families. 20.0% of all households were made up of individuals, and 10.0% had someone living alone who was 65 years of age or older. The average household size was 2.33 and the average family size was 2.70.

In the plantation the population was spread out, with 23.7% under the age of 18, 4.3% from 18 to 24, 20.4% from 25 to 44, 32.3% from 45 to 64, and 19.4% who were 65 years of age or older. The median age was 45 years. For every 100 females, there were 97.9 males. For every 100 females age 18 and over, there were 86.8 males.

The median income for a household in the plantation was $31,875, and the median income for a family was $39,688. Males had a median income of $25,625 versus $19,464 for females. The per capita income for the plantation was $17,874. None of the population and none of the families were below the poverty line.
