= Lemon Stream (Sandy River tributary) =

- Lemon Stream in Starks

Location
- Country: United States

Physical characteristics
- Source
  - location: Maine
  - elevation: 1,460 feet (450 m)
- Mouth
  - location: Sandy River
  - coordinates: 44°42′42″N 69°54′59″W
  - elevation: 185 feet (56 m)
- Length: 15 mi (24 km)

Basin features
- Progression: Sandy River – Kennebec River

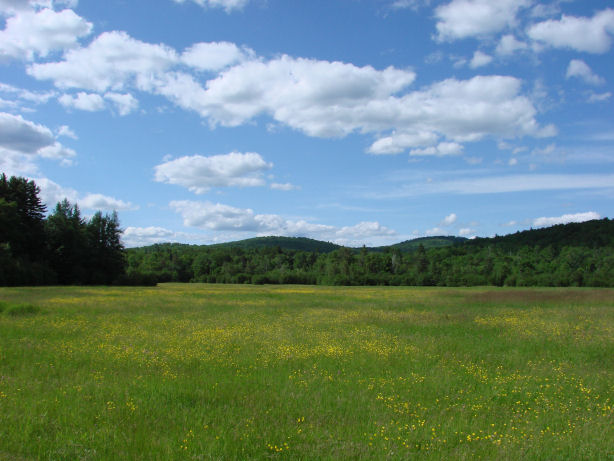
View looking north of upper Lemon Stream valley

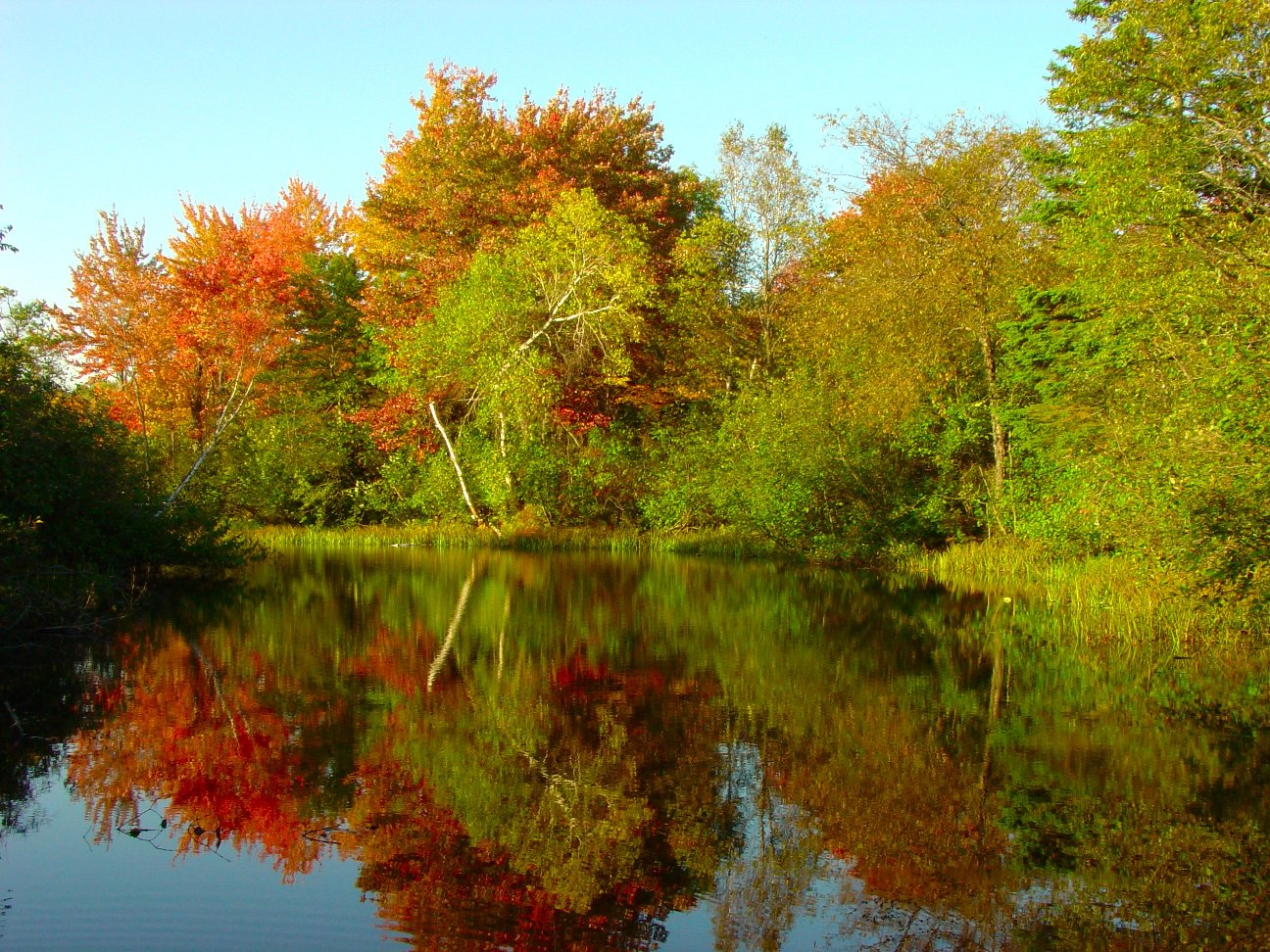
Lemon Stream Pool

Lemon Stream is a 15.2-mile-long (24.5 km) tributary of the Sandy River, that rises in the New Vineyard mountain range in Franklin County, Maine, USA. Via the Sandy River, it is part of the Kennebec River watershed.

The source of Lemon Stream is a spring located 1,460 feet (450 m) above sea level between Little Mountain and Caswell Mountain. It flows southeasterly across the northeast corner of Industry, enters Somerset County through the southwest corner of Anson, and then meets the larger Sandy River which forms the southern boundary of Starks. It is not to be confused with the deeply shadowed north-flowing brook in New Portland, Maine of the same name.

Lemon Stream flows from upper level wetlands on the southeastward slopes of the New Vineyard mountains, drops over numerous falls into the fields of upper Lemon Stream valley, then moves south through the sugar maple woodlands into the lower Lemon Stream valley. Here it widens and slows behind a small hydroelectric dam in Starks. Below the dam it snakes further south through more woods and farmland until the shifting sands of its delta yields to the eastward flowing Sandy River.
