= Rangeley Plantation, Maine =

- Plantation
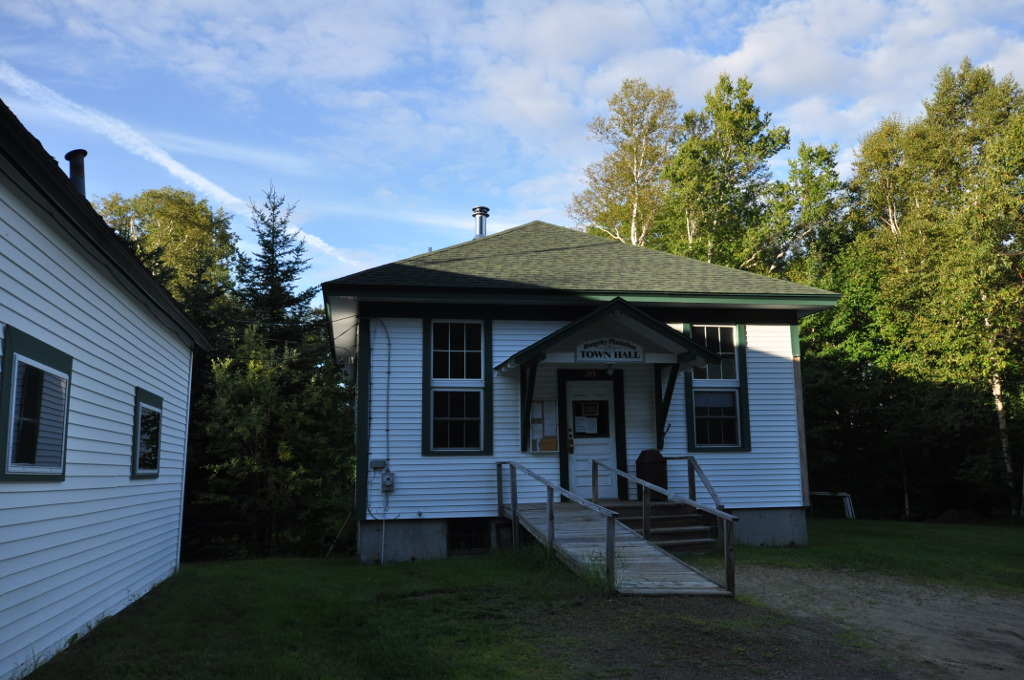
- Rangeley Plantation Town Offices

- Location within Maine Location within the United States
- Coordinates: 44°53′15″N 70°42′15″W
- Country: United States
- State: Maine
- County: Franklin

Area
  - Total: 47.4 sq mi (122.8 km^{2})
  - Land: 40.7 sq mi (105.4 km^{2})
  - Water: 6.7 sq mi (17.4 km^{2})
- Elevation: 1,969 ft (600 m)

Population (2020)
  - Total: 184
  - Density: 4.52/sq mi (1.75/km^{2})
- Time zone: UTC-5 (Eastern (EST))
  - Summer (DST): UTC-4 (EDT)
- ZIP codes: 04970 (Rangeley); 04964 (Oquossoc)
- Area code: 207
- FIPS code: 23-61875
- GNIS feature ID: 582691

Rangeley Plantation is a plantation in Franklin County, Maine, United States. The population was 184 at the 2020 census.

== Geography ==
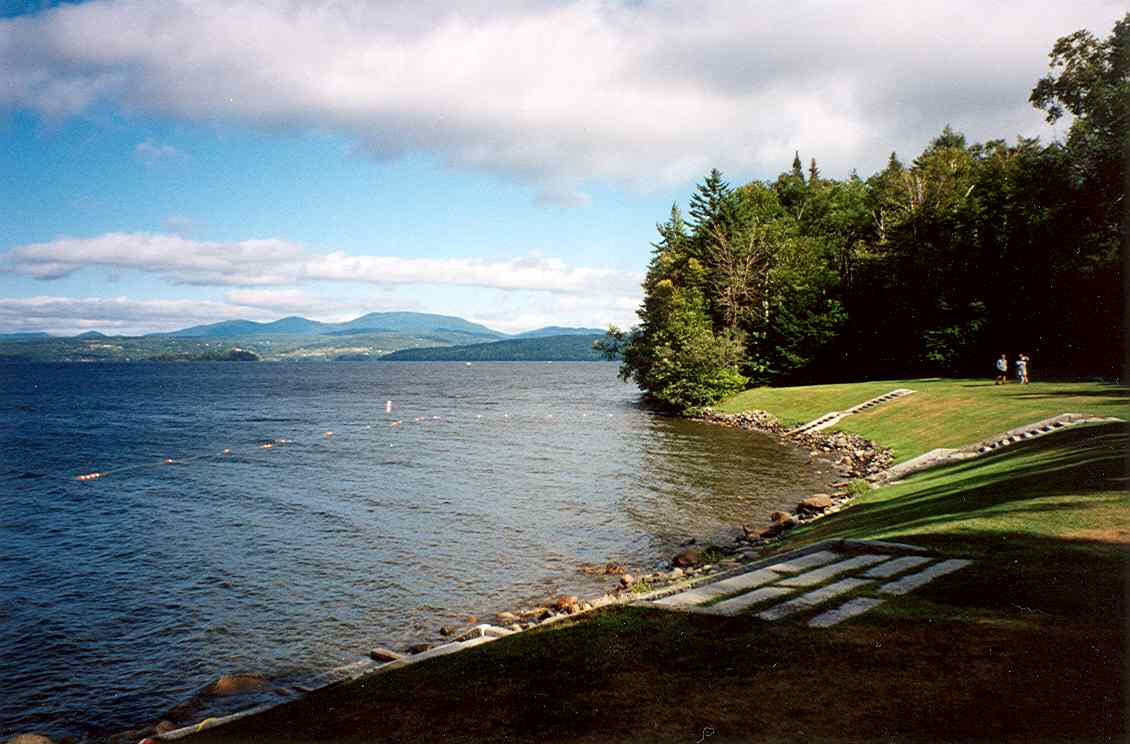
Swimming area at Rangeley Lake State Park

According to the United States Census Bureau, the plantation has a total area of 47.4 square miles (123 km^{2}), of which 40.7 square miles (105 km^{2}) is land and 6.7 square miles (17 km^{2}) (14.17%) is water. The northern part of Rangeley Plantation includes part of Rangeley Lake, and is home to Rangeley Lake State Park.

== Demographics ==
Historical population
Census	Pop.	Note	%±
1870	45		—
1880	64		42.2%
1890	58		−9.4%
1900	98		69.0%
1910	190		93.9%
1920	159		−16.3%
1930	79		−50.3%
1940	63		−20.3%
1950	44		−30.2%
1960	39		−11.4%
1970	52		33.3%
1980	69		32.7%
1990	103		49.3%
2000	123		19.4%
2010	189		53.7%
2020	184		−2.6%
U.S. Decennial Census

As of the census of 2000, there were 123 people, 57 households, and 42 families residing in the plantation. The population density was 3.0 people per square mile (1.2 people/km^{2}). There were 516 housing units at an average density of 12.7 per square mile (4.9/km^{2}). The racial makeup of the plantation was 100.00% White.

There were 57 households, out of which 15.8% had children under the age of 18 living with them, 68.4% were married couples living together, 3.5% had a female householder with no husband present, and 26.3% were non-families. 21.1% of all households were made up of individuals, and 5.3% had someone living alone who was 65 years of age or older. The average household size was 2.16 and the average family size was 2.45.

In the plantation the population was spread out, with 13.0% under the age of 18, 2.4% from 18 to 24, 16.3% from 25 to 44, 43.1% from 45 to 64, and 25.2% who were 65 years of age or older. The median age was 54 years. For every 100 females, there were 92.2 males. For every 100 females age 18 and over, there were 101.9 males.

The median income for a household in the plantation was $34,167, and the median income for a family was $37,679. Males had a median income of $30,250 versus $14,167 for females. The per capita income for the plantation was $18,370. There were 4.9% of families and 6.7% of the population living below the poverty line, including no under eighteens and none of those over 64.
