= South Branch Sandy River =

Location
- Country: United States

Physical characteristics
- Source
  - location: Maine
  - elevation: 2,500 feet (760 m)
- Mouth
  - location: Sandy River
  - coordinates: 44°51′09″N 70°25′51″W
  - elevation: 730 feet (220 m)
- Length: 7.4 mi (11.9 km)

Basin features
- Progression: Sandy River – Kennebec River

The South Branch Sandy River is a short tributary of the Sandy River in Franklin County, Maine. From its source (44°46′20″N 70°28′41″W) on Blueberry Mountain in Berlin (Township 6 north of Weld), the river runs 7.4 miles (11.9 km) northeast to its confluence with the Sandy River in Phillips.

== See also ==
- List of rivers of Maine
