= Smalls Falls =

Waterfall in Maine, United States

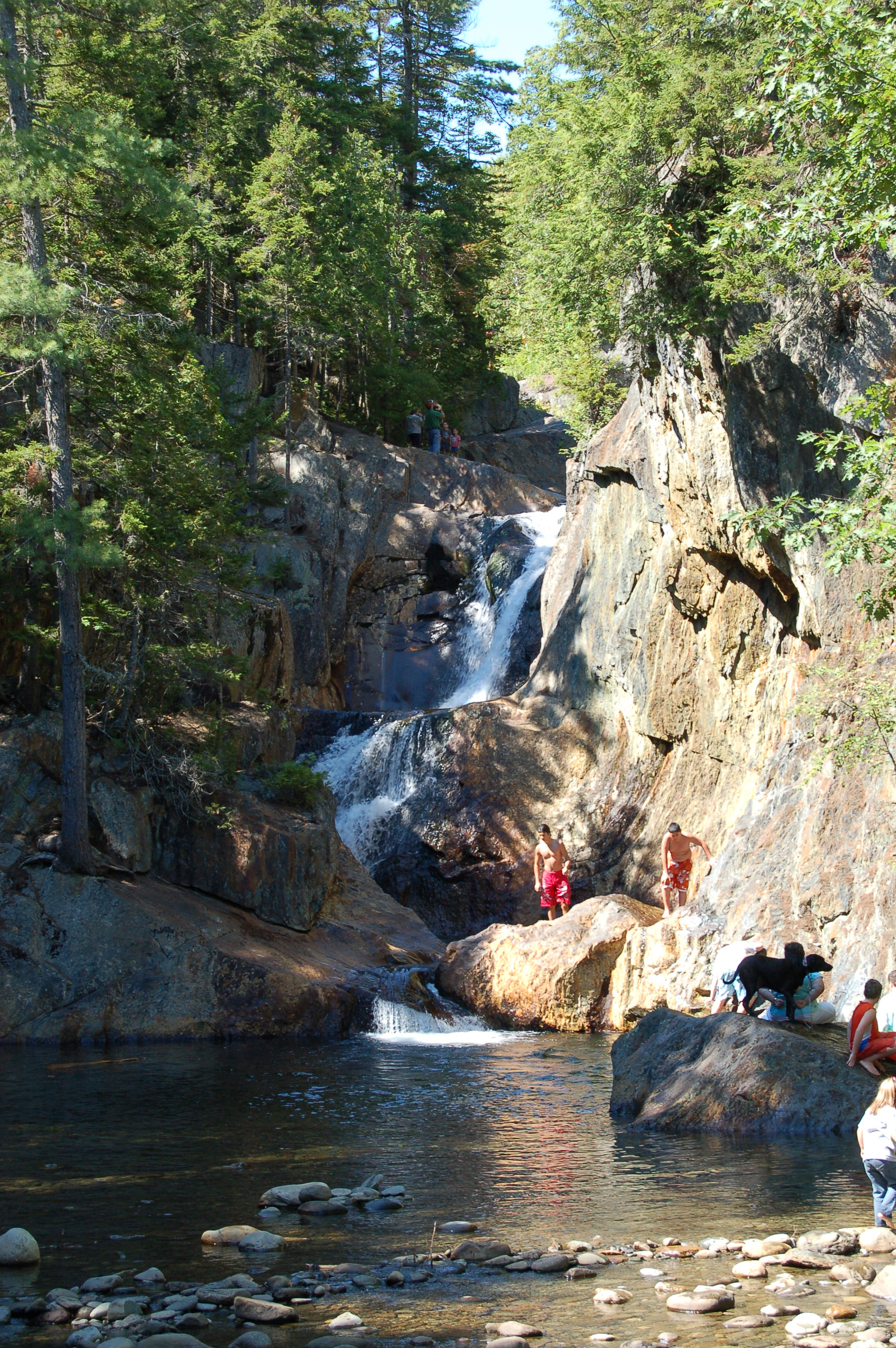
- Smalls Falls, in Maine
- Interactive map of Smalls Falls
- Location: Franklin County, Maine, United States
- Coordinates: 44°51′31″N 70°31′00″W
- Type: Tiered
- Total height: 16.5 m (54 ft)
- Number of drops: 4
- Longest drop: 7.6 m (25 ft)

Smalls Falls, a waterfall in Maine, is a series of waterfalls and cascades on the Sandy River in Township E, West Central Franklin, Maine, in the United States. It totals 54 feet (16 m) in height, and consists of (from top to bottom) a 12-foot slide/horsetail, a 25-foot segmented waterfall, a 14-foot horsetail, and a 3-foot cascade, separated by pools. A rest area on Maine Route 4 provides access to the falls; the rest area includes pit toilets, parking and picnic tables.

== See also ==
- List of waterfalls
