= Rangeley Lake Seaplane Base =

- IATA: none; ICAO: none; FAA LID: M57

Summary
- Airport type: Public use
- Owner: Stephen C. Philbrick
- Serves: Rangeley, Maine
- Elevation AMSL: 1,518 ft / 463 m
- Coordinates: 44°57′12″N 070°39′47″W

Map
- Location of airport in Maine M57 (the United States)

Runways
Direction	Length		Surface
Direction	ft	m	Surface
6/24	7,000	2,134	Water

Statistics (2010)
- Aircraft operations: 200
- Source: Federal Aviation Administration

Rangeley Lake Seaplane Base (FAA LID: M57) is a privately owned, public use seaplane base on Rangeley Lake, located two nautical miles (4 km) north of the central business district of Rangeley, a town in Franklin County, Maine, United States.

== Facilities and aircraft ==
Rangeley Lake Seaplane Base has one seaplane landing area designated 6/24 with a water surface measuring 7,000 x 1,000 feet (2,134 x 305 m). For the 12-month period ending August 16, 2010, the airport had 200 general aviation aircraft operations, an average of 16 per month.

== See also ==
- List of airports in Maine
- Stephen A. Bean Municipal Airport at 44°59′31″N 070°39′53″W
