= Stephen Phillips Memorial Preserve =

Coordinates: 44.8999°N 70.7976°W

The Stephen Phillips Memorial Preserve is land and islands on Mooselookmeguntic Lake, Maine. Extending over 6,000 acres, it is one of the largest protected wilderness areas in the state. The Preserve was created in 1963 as a means of protecting the natural beauty of the land, while maintaining accessibility to the public. There is wilderness camping on the east and west shores of the lake, Student's Island, Toothaker Island, Shelter Island, Farrington Island, and Griffin Island. Each campsite has a tent pad and access to an outhouse. There are approximately 60 campsites at the Preserve.

Toothaker Island is the largest island on the lake, and has six campsites. Roughly 1/3 of this island belongs to the Preserve. Student's Island is one mile long, and has eighteen campsites on it, as well as hiking trails that traverse the back side of the island. Student's Island is entirely owned by the Preserve.
