= Rangeley Lake =

Lake in Maine, United States

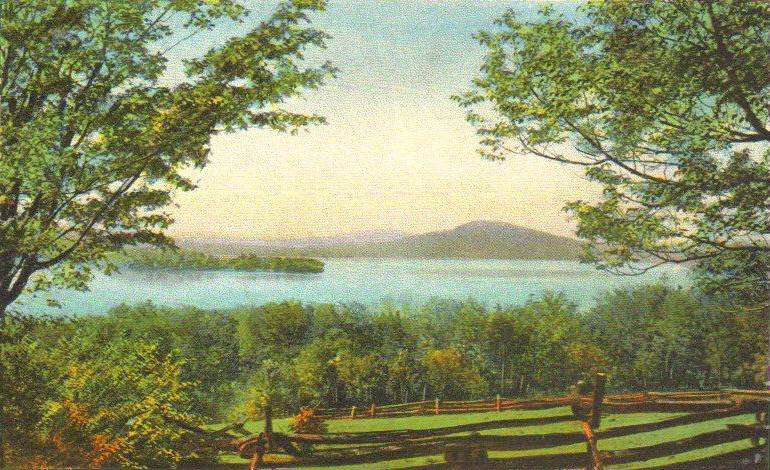
- Postcard ca. 1920

- Location within Maine Location within the United States
- Location: Franklin County, Maine
- Coordinates: 44°56′50.7″N 70°41′34.6″W
- Type: mesotrophic
- Primary outflows: Rangeley River
- Catchment area: 100 square miles (260 km^{2})
- Basin countries: United States
- Surface area: 6,302 acres (2,550 ha)
- Average depth: 60 feet (18 m)
- Max. depth: 149 feet (45 m)
- Water volume: 291,048 acre⋅ft (359,002,000 m^{3})
- Residence time: 2.6 years
- Shore length^{1}: 32.7 miles (52.6 km)
- Surface elevation: 1,518 feet (463 m)
- ^{1} Shore length is not a well-defined measure.

Rangeley Lake, located in Franklin County, Maine, United States, is fed by several streams. Its waters flow out from the lake's northwestern corner via the short Rangeley River into Mooselookmeguntic Lake, then Upper and Lower Richardson Lakes, Umbagog Lake and ultimately into the Androscoggin River, Merrymeeting Bay, the lower Kennebec River, the Gulf of Maine and the Atlantic Ocean.

The lake is one of the major headwater lakes of the Androscoggin watershed. Its elevation is 1,518 feet (463 m) above sea level, and its area is about 10 square miles (26 km^{2}). The lake's depth is shallow near the shore, with a central basin averaging about 95 feet (29 m) deep. The maximum depth is 149 feet (45 m).

The lake is primarily in the town of Rangeley, while the southern edge of the lake is in Rangeley Plantation. The town's eponymous village is located on the northeastern shore of Rangeley Lake, at City Cove, while the village of Oquossoc is at the lake's outlet at its northwest end.

Maneskootuk Island (also called Doctors Island) is in the eastern part of Rangeley Lake. In the western part there is a small group of islands collectively called South Bog Islands.

== Rangeley Lake Seaplane Base ==
Rangeley Lake has a designated water landing zone for seaplanes (United States Aerodrome M57 – Rangeley Lake Seaplane Base). This is one of only a very few aerodromes in the world to be serviced by a GPS instrument approach aligned to a water aerodrome, as well as an NDB approach; almost all other instrument approaches are aligned to runways on land surfaces such as pavement, asphalt, gravel, or turf.

== Gallery ==
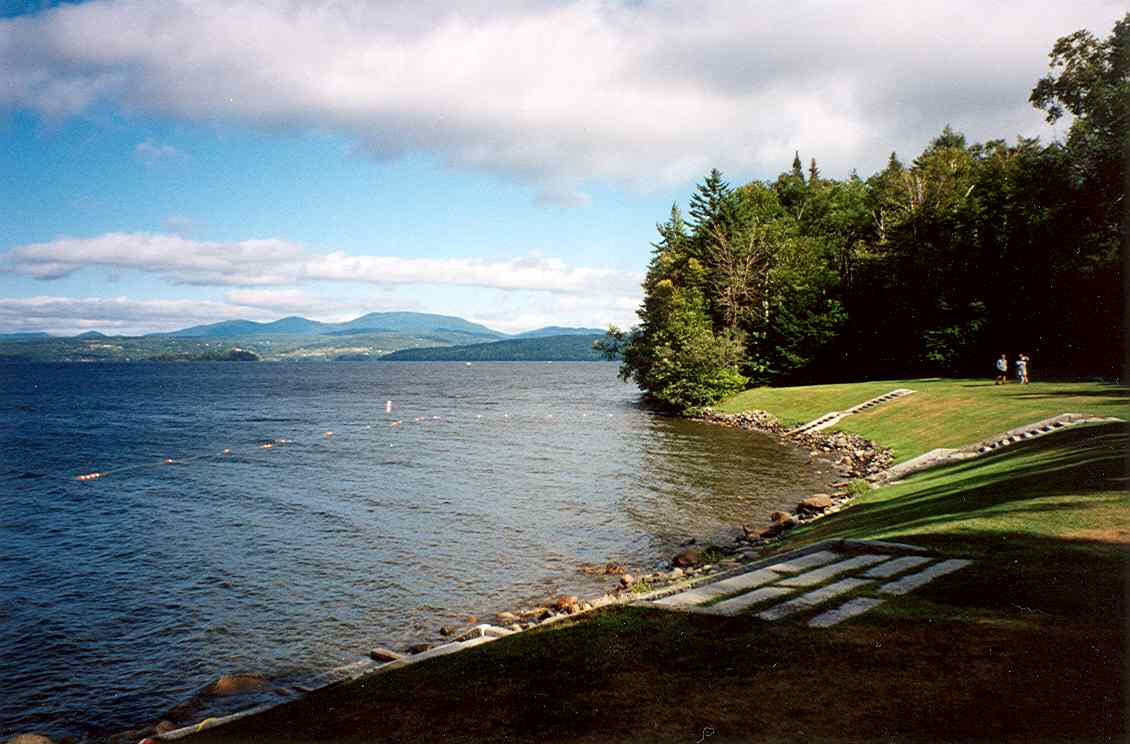
Rangeley Lake State Park

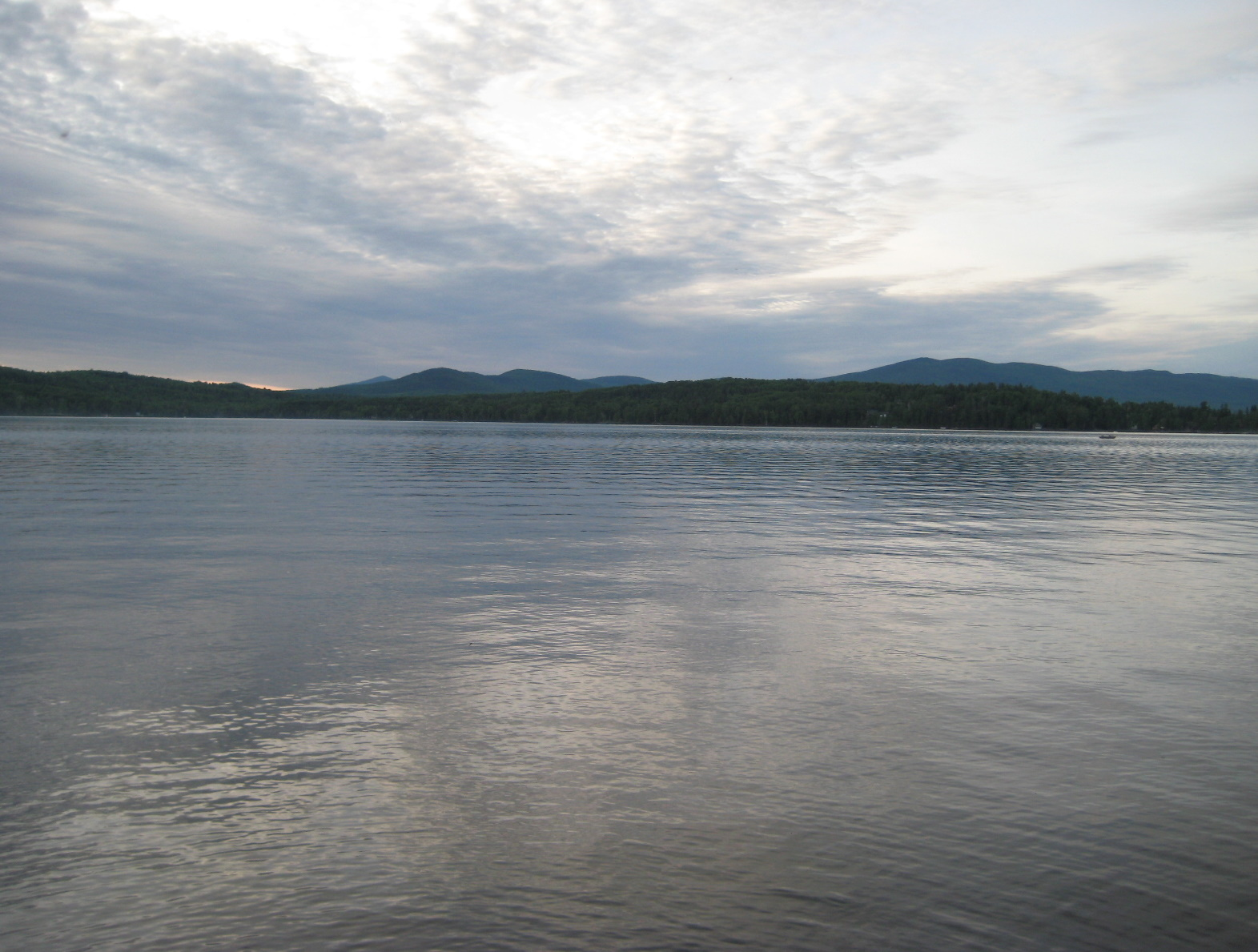
Rangeley Lake from its southern edge, inside the State Park

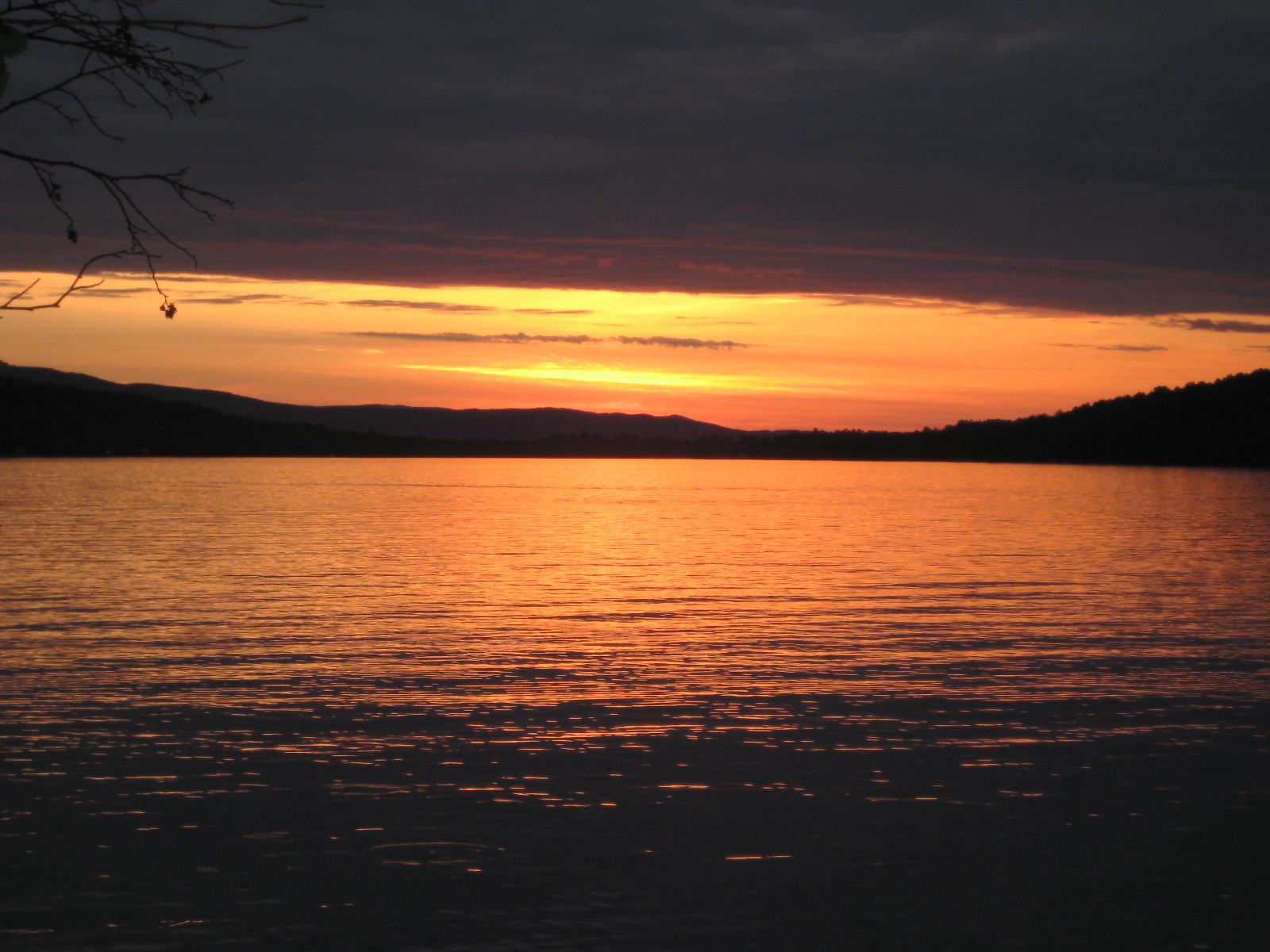
Sunset

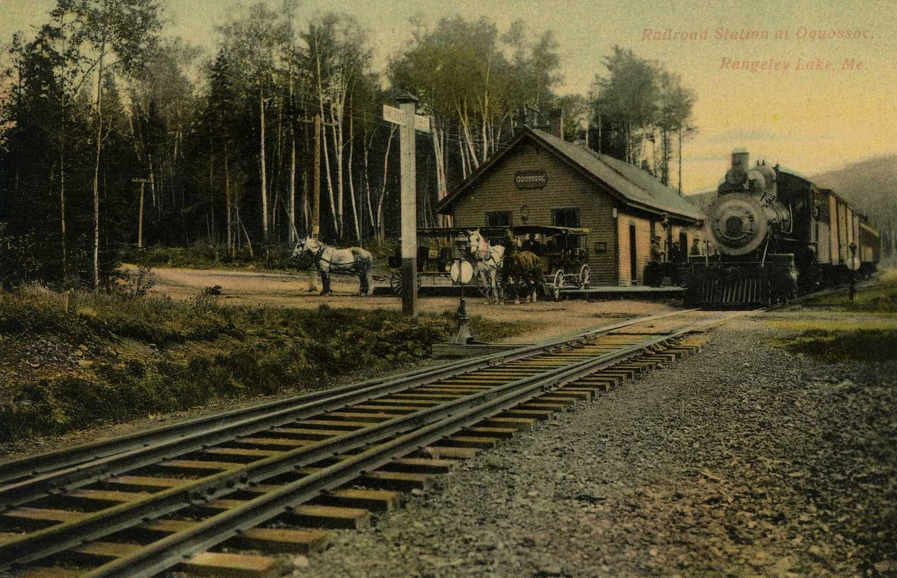
Rangeley Lake station, ca. 1910
