= William H. J. Rangeley =

Nyasaland administrator

William H J Rangeley (1910–1958) was an officer in the colonial administration of Nyasaland and a scholar of the oral history and ethnography of the peoples of what is now Malawi.

== Early life and education ==
William Rangeley, who was the son of two early Northern Rhodesia pioneers, Henry Rangeley and Florence (née van Breda), was born at Fort Jameson, (now Chipata, Zambia), in what was then Northern Rhodesia, on 2 July 1909. He attended a school in Plumtree in Southern Rhodesia, and then the Diocesan College at Rondebosch, a suburb of Cape Town, in South Africa. He attended Rhodes University in Grahamstown and, under a Rhodes Scholarship he studied at Brasenose College, Oxford, from which he subsequently received a diploma in Anthropology following study during an extended leave.

== Administrative career ==
After his scholarship at Oxford University ended, he was appointed to the colonial administration of Nyasaland in 1934. He served in many districts and became District Commissioner successively in Nkhotakota District in the Central Province and Mzimba District in the Northern Province. He was promoted to become the Provincial Commissioner for the Southern Province in 1952. He retained his post as Provincial Commissioner until his death in 1958.

Between 1892 and 1904, district officers with the official title of Collectors of Revenue, later that of Resident, were appointed by the Commissioner and Consul-General of the protectorate. From 1904, the Colonial Office assumed responsibility for appointments, but before the First World War these officials included ex-soldiers and ex-missionary employees whose African experience was their main qualification for the post. After the First World War, the preferred candidates were from the British upper middle class, educated in British public schools and, if possible, universities. By the 1930s, most new district officers were graduates; the Colonial Office preferred those from Oxford or Cambridge but graduates of these elite universities usually chose colonies such as Kenya or Southern Rhodesia. Rangeley did not have the usual background of district officers of that time, and he was described as "rough-hewn", but his Rhodes Scholarship to Cambridge made him a suitable candidate.

In 1933, Indirect rule was introduced into Nyasaland, and customary law needed to be understood by what were now called District Commissioners, who had to ensure that local customary law was being correctly applied by each Native Authority in their districts. Up to this point, the customary law of African societies had been evolving in response to rapid changes within themselves, and in colonial society generally, but the colonial administration wanted laws that were codified and consistent with English law, which involved rejecting Trial by ordeal or the recognition of domestic slavery. Rangeley was particularly well equipped for this task through his anthropological training and meticulous recording of information, and also his childhood in an area where the Chewa language, also used in central Nyasaland, was spoken.

The first stadium built in Blantyre was named the Rangeley Stadium after him, but renamed the Kamuzu Stadium after the first president of the independent Malawi, Dr Hastings Kamuzu Banda.

== Research interests ==
Rangeley joined the Nyasaland Society, now the Society of Malawi, Historical and Scientific, in 1948 and produced a detailed anthropological study of the Chewa people in the first volume of The Nyasaland Journal. As a trained anthropologist, Rangeley was able to carry out original research into the history and culture of the indigenous peoples of Nyasaland living in the areas where his successive appointments took him and he produced around a dozen articles for the Nyasaland Journal before his death. Two articles published in 1959 and 1960 were completed before his death and six published between 1962 and 1964 were chapters of a proposed comprehensive history of Nyasaland. He also undertook investigation of early habitation sites and rock art

== Death ==
Rangeley died of drowning while on a fishing holiday at Cape Agulhas, South Africa on 20 March 1958. There is no record of him marrying or having children.

== Sources ==
- O. J. M. Kalinga (2012). Historical Dictionary of Malawi (fourth edition), Toronto, Scarecrow Press, ISBN 978-0-8108-5961-6.
- J McCracken, (2012). A History of Malawi, 1859–1966, Woodbridge, James CurreyISBN 978-1-84701-050-6.
- Obituary, (1958). W. H. J. Rangeley. The Nyasaland Journal, Vol. 11, No. 2.
- B Pachai, (2000). 'Notes on Cewa Tribal Law' by W. H. J. Rangeley. The Society of Malawi Journal, Vol. 53, No. 1/2, A Special Millennium Edition.
