= Richardson Lakes (Maine) =

- Location within Maine Location within the United States
- Location: Oxford County, Maine
- Coordinates: 44°47′N 70°54′W
- Lake type: Reservoir
- Primary inflows: Mooselookmeguntic Lake
- Primary outflows: Rapid River
- Basin countries: United States
- Max. length: 14 mi (23 km)
- Max. width: 1.4 mi (2.3 km)
- Surface area: 7,751 acres (3,137 ha)
- Max. depth: 108 feet (33 m)
- Water volume: 147,096 acre⋅ft (181,440,000 m^{3})
- Surface elevation: 1,447 ft (441 m)

Upper Richardson Lake and Lower Richardson Lake are impounded as a single reservoir by Middle Dam at the outlet to Rapid River on the western shore of the lower lake. Rapid River flows 5 miles (8.0 km) to Umbagog Lake headwaters of the Androscoggin River. Upper Richardson Lake is in the western portion of Richardsontown township, and the lower lake is on the border of Magalloway and Maine Township C. Primary inflow is discharge over Upper Dam on Mooselookmeguntic Lake on the eastern shore of the upper lake. Smaller tributaries entering the north end of the upper lake include Mill Brook draining the Richardson Ponds, Fish Brook draining Fish Pond, and Beaver Brook draining Beaver Pond, Little Beaver Pond, and Aziscohos Pond. Other small tributaries include Rand Brook on the western shore, and Mosquito Brook, Metallak Brook, and Bailey Brook on the eastern shore. The lake offers excellent habitat for adult trout, but with dams on the outlet and no major inlet, fish populations are limited by the insufficient spawning and nursery areas of these small tributaries. The public boat launch area at the north end of the upper lake is 1 mile (1.6 km) off Maine State Route 16; and the boat launch area at the south end of the lower lake is accessed by driving 12 miles (19 km) north of Andover on South Arm Road.

Original Names The Richardson Lakes were known locally by their original Abenaki names well into the 20th Century. Upper Richardson was Molechunkamunk and Lower Richardson was Welokennebacook or Welokenegagcook. According to Daphne Merrill (“The Lakes of Maine: A Compilation of Fact and Legend”, 1973), Molechunkamunk meant "stream in a deep ravine", and Welokennebacook meant "the place of the river coming from a lake".

== Climate ==
Climate data for Middle Dam, Maine 1991–2020 normals, extremes 1926-2020: 1460ft (445m)
Month	Jan	Feb	Mar	Apr	May	Jun	Jul	Aug	Sep	Oct	Nov	Dec	Year
Record high °F (°C)	59 (15)	63 (17)	78 (26)	86 (30)	90 (32)	94 (34)	94 (34)	96 (36)	92 (33)	81 (27)	70 (21)	62 (17)	96 (36)
Mean maximum °F (°C)	46 (8)	47 (8)	57 (14)	72 (22)	81 (27)	87 (31)	87 (31)	86 (30)	82 (28)	73 (23)	62 (17)	50 (10)	89 (32)
Mean daily maximum °F (°C)	24.3 (−4.3)	27.4 (−2.6)	36.0 (2.2)	48.0 (8.9)	61.6 (16.4)	71.1 (21.7)	76.2 (24.6)	75.2 (24.0)	67.6 (19.8)	54.2 (12.3)	41.4 (5.2)	30.4 (−0.9)	51.1 (10.6)
Daily mean °F (°C)	13.4 (−10.3)	15.1 (−9.4)	24.2 (−4.3)	37.3 (2.9)	50.3 (10.2)	60.1 (15.6)	65.2 (18.4)	63.9 (17.7)	56.3 (13.5)	44.2 (6.8)	32.8 (0.4)	21.3 (−5.9)	40.3 (4.6)
Mean daily minimum °F (°C)	2.4 (−16.4)	2.8 (−16.2)	12.4 (−10.9)	26.6 (−3.0)	38.9 (3.8)	49.2 (9.6)	54.2 (12.3)	52.5 (11.4)	45.1 (7.3)	34.3 (1.3)	24.3 (−4.3)	12.3 (−10.9)	29.6 (−1.3)
Mean minimum °F (°C)	−22 (−30)	−17 (−27)	−10 (−23)	13 (−11)	27 (−3)	36 (2)	44 (7)	41 (5)	32 (0)	23 (−5)	9 (−13)	−9 (−23)	−23 (−31)
Record low °F (°C)	−34 (−37)	−33 (−36)	−28 (−33)	−10 (−23)	16 (−9)	28 (−2)	33 (1)	29 (−2)	19 (−7)	12 (−11)	−8 (−22)	−28 (−33)	−34 (−37)
Average precipitation inches (mm)	2.49 (63)	2.27 (58)	2.64 (67)	3.24 (82)	3.69 (94)	4.20 (107)	4.01 (102)	3.80 (97)	3.22 (82)	4.63 (118)	3.18 (81)	3.47 (88)	40.84 (1,039)
Average snowfall inches (cm)	18.7 (47)	20.1 (51)	16.8 (43)	5.8 (15)	0.1 (0.25)	trace	0.0 (0.0)	0.0 (0.0)	trace	1.0 (2.5)	5.2 (13)	19.8 (50)	87.5 (221.75)
Source 1: NOAA
Source 2: XMACIS (snowfall, temp records & monthly max/mins)
