= Sandy River (Kennebec River tributary) =

River in Maine, United States

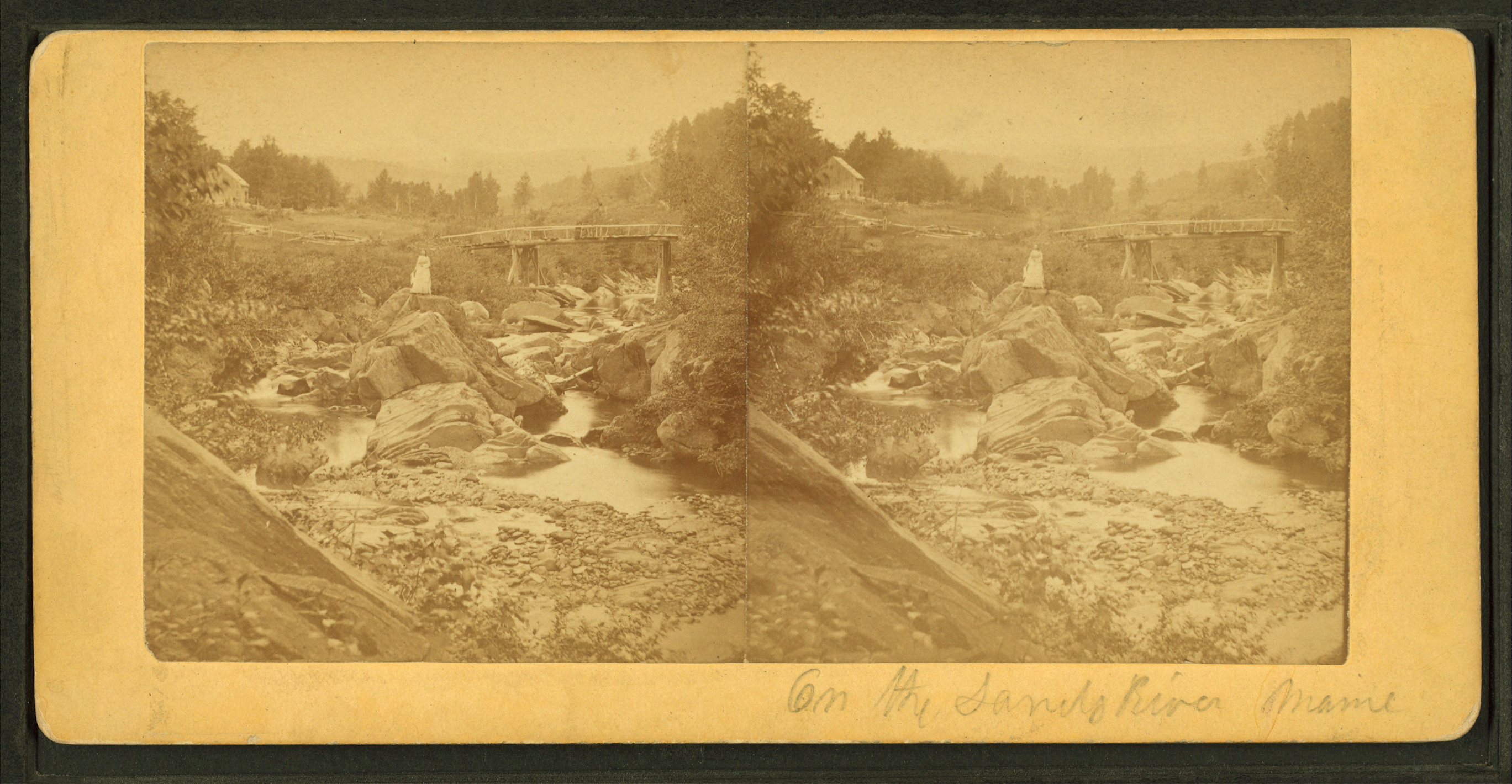
- Stereoscopic view of the river c. 1875

Location
- Country: United States

Physical characteristics
- Source
  - location: Phillips, Maine
  - elevation: 1,700 feet (520 m)
- Mouth
  - location: Kennebec River
  - coordinates: 44°45′52″N 69°53′23″W
  - elevation: 156 feet (48 m)
- Length: 73 mi (117 km)
- Discharge
  - average: 874 cu ft/s (24.7 m^{3}/s)

Basin features
- Tributaries
  - left: Lemon Stream
  - right: South Branch Sandy River

The Sandy River is a 73.3-mile-long (118.0 km) tributary of the Kennebec River in the U.S. state of Maine.

The Sandy River originates in the Sandy River Ponds (44°53′37″N 70°32′26″W) at an elevation of 1,700 feet (520 m) in Sandy River Plantation. The river flows south to a confluence with Chandler Mill Stream in Maine Township E and then easterly to its confluence with Saddleback Stream in Madrid, and Orbeton Stream in Phillips. The river then flows southeasterly through the villages of Phillips and Strong. The river flows south from Strong to Farmington and flows northeasterly from Farmington Falls through New Sharon to discharge into the Kennebec River in Norridgewock a short distance south of the Madison town line. Maine State Route 4 follows the river from the Sandy River Ponds and bridges it at Strong along the way to Farmington, where it is again bridged. The river is bridged once more at Farmington by U.S. Route 2. Route 2 follows the river downstream to New Sharon where it makes the last bridged crossing of the river before its confluence with the Kennebec.

== History ==
The Abenaki people found the lower river a good route for canoe travel; Phillips remained an important fishing location until dams prevented anadromous fish migration. Fish would wait at Salmon Hole until flow enabled them to swim into the higher-gradient spawning gravels upstream of that point. European settlement of the lower valley began during the American Revolutionary War. Building of water-powered mills had produced incorporated towns as far upstream as Madrid by the time of Maine statehood in 1820. Early European settlers farmed the river lowlands between the last spring frost in May and the first autumn frost in September. Tree-cutting began after the autumn harvest; logs and lumber were moved on sleds while snow covered the ground from December through March.

A major flood in October 1869, locally known as the "pumpkin freshet", destroyed every bridge over the river and most of the early mills. Rebuilding brought larger mills to Phillips, Farmington, and New Sharon, and the river was closely followed by the narrow gauge Sandy River Railroad from Phillips to Farmington in 1879. Construction of the Phillips and Rangeley Railroad up Orbeton Stream in 1891 enabled logging of the headwaters. Large steam sawmills on Redington Pond at the head of Orbeton Stream and on Toothaker Pond in Phillips converted the aboriginal spruce forests to lumber between 1891 and 1908. Pulpwood cutting kept the railroad profitable through World War I, but sustained forest yield was insufficient to pay operating costs. The railroad went into receivership in 1923 and was dismantled from 1934 to 1936. A week of rain on accumulated winter snow washed out the Redington Pond dam and produced the largest recorded river flow of 38,000 cu ft/s (1,100 m^{3}/s) on 18–19 March 1936.

== See also ==
- List of rivers of Maine
