= Oquossoc, Maine =

- Village
- Location within Maine Location within the United States
- Coordinates: 44°57′59″N 70°46′25″W
- Country: United States
- State: Maine
- County: Franklin
- Elevation: 1,529 ft (466 m)
- Time zone: UTC-5 (Eastern (EST))
  - Summer (DST): UTC-4 (EDT)
- ZIP code: 04964
- Area code: 207
- GNIS feature ID: 572751

Oquossoc is an unincorporated village in the town of Rangeley, Franklin County, Maine, United States. The community is located at the junction of Maine State Route 4 and Maine State Route 17 at the northwest tip of Rangeley Lake. Oquossoc has a post office with ZIP code 04964, which opened on December 17, 1902.
