= Rangeley River =

River in Maine, United States of America

Coordinates: 44°58′13.6″N 70°46′33.5″W

The Rangeley River is located in Franklin County, Maine, in the United States. It is only about a mile long, connecting the outlet of Rangeley Lake with Mooselookmeguntic Lake.

It is part of the Androscoggin River watershed.
