= Rangeley, Maine =

Town in Maine, United States

- Town
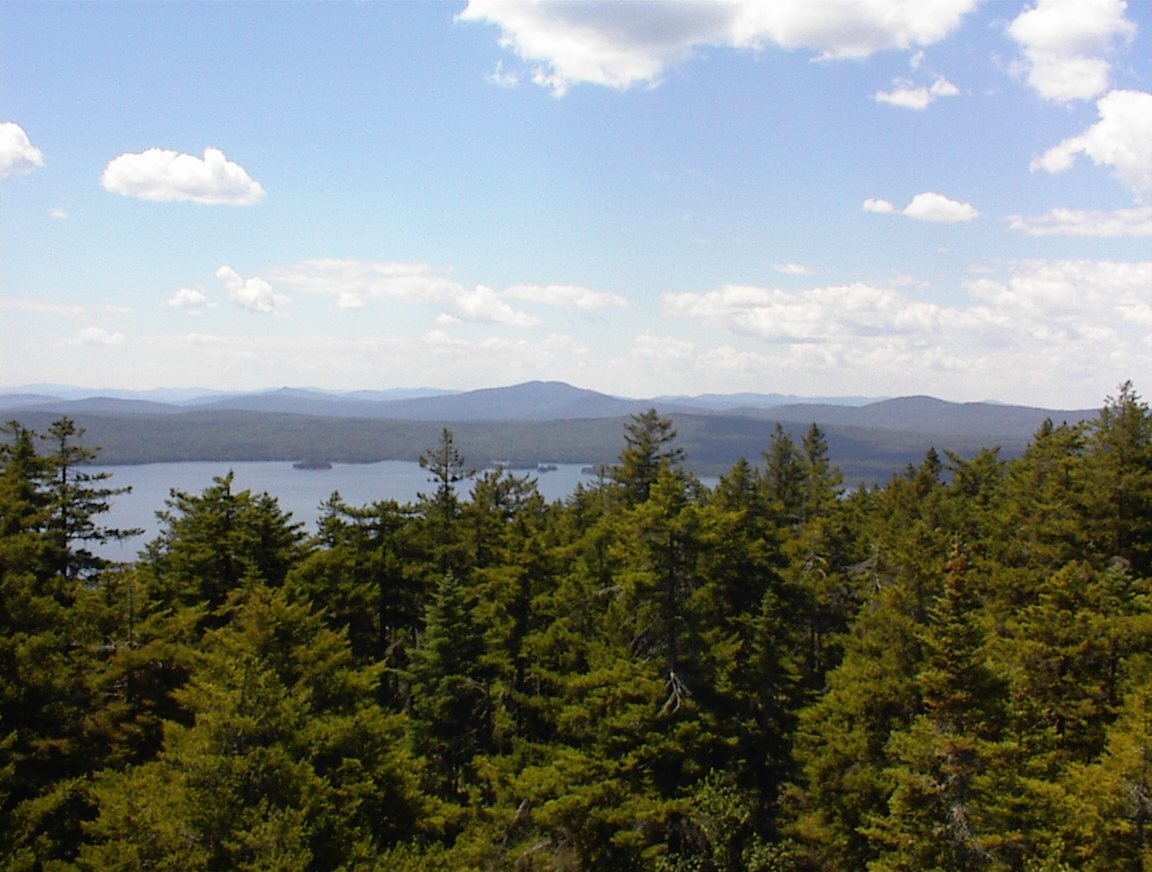
- View from Bald Mountain

- Seal
- Motto: "Maine's Four Season Playground"
- Location within Maine Location within the United States
- Coordinates: 44°59′30″N 70°45′52″W
- Country: United States
- State: Maine
- County: Franklin
- Incorporated: 1855
- Villages: Rangeley; Bald Mountain; Mooselookmeguntic; Mountainview; Oquossoc; South Rangeley

Area
  - Total: 55.62 sq mi (144.06 km^{2})
  - Land: 41.48 sq mi (107.43 km^{2})
  - Water: 14.14 sq mi (36.62 km^{2})
- Elevation: 1,588 ft (484 m)

Population (2020)
  - Total: 1,222
  - Density: 30/sq mi (11.4/km^{2})
- Time zone: UTC−5 (Eastern (EST))
  - Summer (DST): UTC4 (EDT)
- ZIP Codes: 04970 (Rangeley); 04964 (Oquossoc)
- Area code: 207
- FIPS code: 23-61840
- GNIS feature ID: 582690
- Website: www.townofrangeley.com

Rangeley is a town in Franklin County, Maine, United States. The population was 1,222 at the 2020 census. Rangeley is the center of the Rangeley Lakes Region, a resort area. The town includes the villages of Rangeley and Oquossoc, as well as the communities of Mooselookmeguntic, Bald Mountain, Mountainview, and South Rangeley.

== History ==
It is named after an Englishman, Squire James Rangeley, who inherited a 31,000-acre (130 km^{2}) tract bought from Massachusetts in 1796 by his father. He arrived in 1825 to establish an estate based on the English system of landlord and tenants, also giving extensive land to settlers. He built a sawmill, a gristmill, a two-story mansion, and a ten-mile (16 km) road to connect his property with the rest of the world. Rangeley resided here for 15 years, then sold the property and moved to Portland.

Farms produced hay, wheat, oats, barley and potatoes, with cattle grazing the hills. Logging became a principal industry, with booms of logs towed by steamboat across the Rangeley lakes, then guided down rivers in log drives. On March 29, 1855, the town of Rangeley was set off and incorporated from a portion of Rangeley Plantation. By 1870, the population was 313. In 1886, it had twenty dwellings, two hotels, two stores and a post office. Industries included a carriage shop, two blacksmith shops, a boat builder's shop, a sawmill and a shoe shop.

The Phillips and Rangeley Railroad, a narrow gauge common carrier, opened in 1891, becoming part of the Sandy River and Rangeley Lakes Railroad in 1908. Timber and other goods were shipped to markets, and tourists arrived from Boston; Hartford; New York City; and Philadelphia. Consequently, the region developed in the 1900s into a seasonal resort area with camps, cabins, summer homes, inns and hotels. The cool mountain climate and abundance of sport fishing made this a highly desirable and exclusive resort destination. Some inhabitants became fishing guides, and among the anglers was President Herbert Hoover. The big hotels would decline, however, with the end of the railroad and invention of the automobile and proliferation of roads leading to vacationers building personal camps. In 1958, The Rangeley Lake House was razed. But smaller motels and camp rentals have taken their place, and Rangeley remains a popular resort.

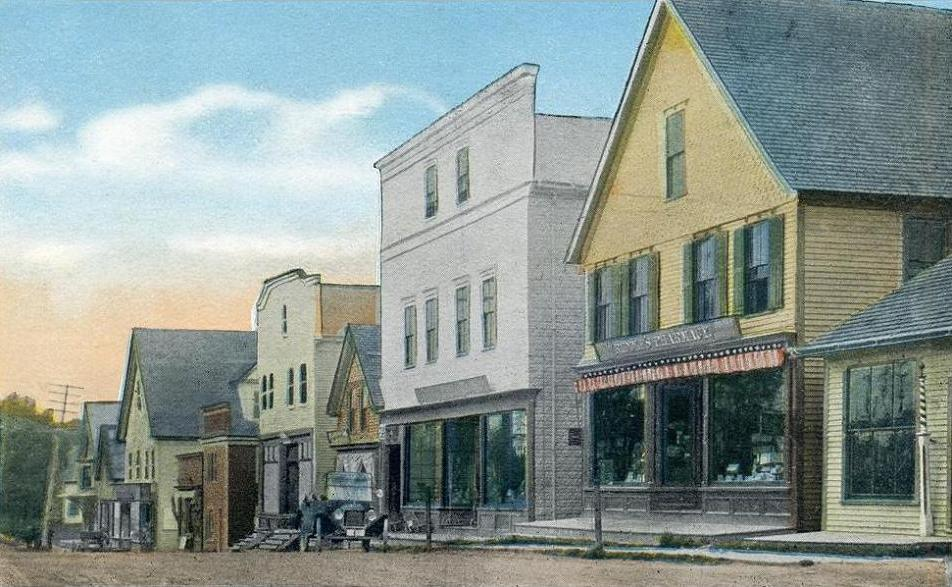
Main Street c. 1915

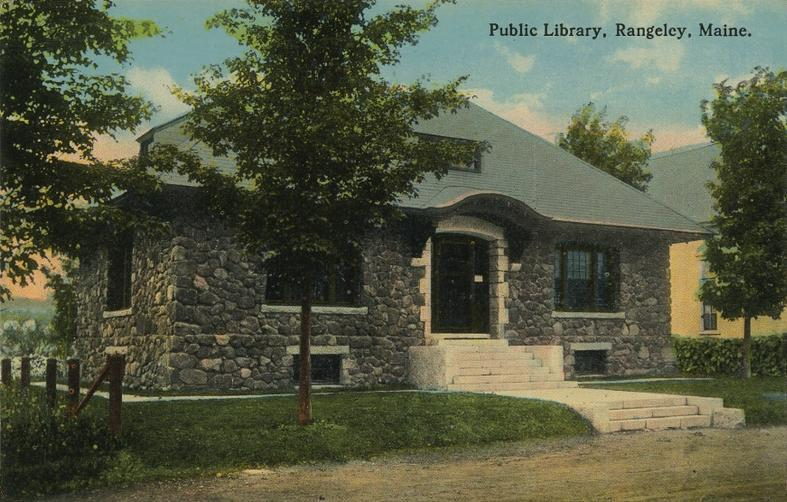
Public Library c. 1912

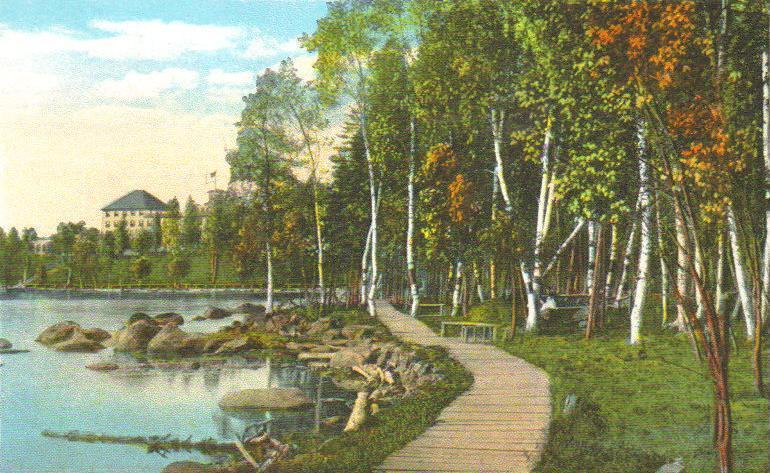
The boardwalk c. 1920

== Geography ==
According to the United States Census Bureau, the town has a total area of 55.62 square miles (144.06 km^{2}), of which 41.48 square miles (107.43 km^{2}) is land and 14.14 square miles (36.62 km^{2}) is water.

Centrally located between the headwaters of both the Androscoggin River and Kennebec River, the town lies on the eastern shores of Rangeley Lake in the Western Maine Mountains. Smalls Falls, lying just south of the town on Route 4, is a popular tourist destination. A sign in town notes that Rangeley is halfway between the Equator and North Pole.

=== Climate ===
This climatic region has large seasonal temperature differences, with warm (and often humid) summers and cold (sometimes severely cold) winters. According to the Köppen Climate Classification system, Rangeley has a humid continental climate, abbreviated "Dfb" on climate maps. Similar to the rest of New England, snowfall is high in Rangeley, but due to the cold mean temperatures in winter, it remains on the ground for several months. Summer temperatures are moderated by the elevation and are thus cooler than other nearby towns.

Rangeley's extreme temperatures since the current station's inception in 1969 have ranged from 94 °F (34 °C) on September 10, 2002, to −45 °F (−43 °C) on January 20, 1994. It is exceptionally rare for a station on the east side of the Americas to have its warmest measured temperature for more than half a century in early fall. Diurnal temperature variation is generally high, which means vast differences between day and night temperatures. Even considering this, Rangeley occasionally gets severe cold also during daytime. The coldest daily high measured was −18 °F (−28 °C) on December 26, 1980, and the mean for the coldest daily maximum during the 1991–2020 normals was in the subzero Fahrenheit range at −2 °F (−19 °C). Warm summer nights are quite rare, with the record high minimum being 70 °F (21 °C) on July 14, 1987, and July 12, 2020, and the 1991–2020 mean for the warmest low being at 65 °F (18 °C). The maximum snow depth measured since regular confirmed recordings were made was at 44 inches (110 cm) on March 8, 1982, and March 31, 2001.

Climate data for Rangeley, Maine, 1991–2020 normals, extremes 1969–present: 1530ft (466m)
Month	Jan	Feb	Mar	Apr	May	Jun	Jul	Aug	Sep	Oct	Nov	Dec	Year
Record high °F (°C)	56 (13)	62 (17)	77 (25)	85 (29)	92 (33)	93 (34)	93 (34)	93 (34)	94 (34)	83 (28)	72 (22)	60 (16)	94 (34)
Mean maximum °F (°C)	44.3 (6.8)	47.0 (8.3)	56.2 (13.4)	70.1 (21.2)	81.6 (27.6)	86.2 (30.1)	87.1 (30.6)	85.4 (29.7)	82.0 (27.8)	72.5 (22.5)	60.7 (15.9)	48.3 (9.1)	89.2 (31.8)
Mean daily maximum °F (°C)	23.0 (−5.0)	26.6 (−3.0)	35.7 (2.1)	48.2 (9.0)	62.5 (16.9)	71.6 (22.0)	76.4 (24.7)	75.2 (24.0)	67.9 (19.9)	53.7 (12.1)	40.4 (4.7)	29.0 (−1.7)	50.9 (10.5)
Daily mean °F (°C)	11.7 (−11.3)	13.2 (−10.4)	22.6 (−5.2)	36.4 (2.4)	49.7 (9.8)	59.6 (15.3)	64.6 (18.1)	63.0 (17.2)	55.8 (13.2)	43.4 (6.3)	31.8 (−0.1)	19.9 (−6.7)	39.3 (4.1)
Mean daily minimum °F (°C)	0.4 (−17.6)	−0.3 (−17.9)	9.4 (−12.6)	24.5 (−4.2)	37.0 (2.8)	47.5 (8.6)	52.7 (11.5)	50.8 (10.4)	43.7 (6.5)	33.2 (0.7)	23.3 (−4.8)	10.7 (−11.8)	27.7 (−2.4)
Mean minimum °F (°C)	−24.1 (−31.2)	−22.4 (−30.2)	−15.9 (−26.6)	9.0 (−12.8)	25.7 (−3.5)	35.1 (1.7)	42.9 (6.1)	40.4 (4.7)	30.5 (−0.8)	21.5 (−5.8)	6.8 (−14.0)	−11.6 (−24.2)	−27.0 (−32.8)
Record low °F (°C)	−45 (−43)	−38 (−39)	−36 (−38)	−9 (−23)	18 (−8)	28 (−2)	32 (0)	30 (−1)	19 (−7)	11 (−12)	−15 (−26)	−33 (−36)	−45 (−43)
Average precipitation inches (mm)	2.82 (72)	2.40 (61)	2.99 (76)	3.27 (83)	3.65 (93)	4.36 (111)	4.04 (103)	4.07 (103)	3.45 (88)	4.61 (117)	3.36 (85)	3.62 (92)	42.64 (1,084)
Average snowfall inches (cm)	24.3 (62)	25.7 (65)	24.4 (62)	8.6 (22)	0.5 (1.3)	0.0 (0.0)	0.0 (0.0)	0.0 (0.0)	0.0 (0.0)	2.3 (5.8)	8.8 (22)	28.7 (73)	123.3 (313.1)
Average extreme snow depth inches (cm)	20.1 (51)	26.4 (67)	27.4 (70)	14.8 (38)	0.2 (0.51)	0.0 (0.0)	0.0 (0.0)	0.0 (0.0)	0.0 (0.0)	2.1 (5.3)	5.4 (14)	15.5 (39)	30.0 (76)
Average precipitation days (≥ 0.01 in)	15.2	12.3	13.1	12.6	14.3	15.1	14.5	13.1	11.2	14.3	14.2	16.6	166.5
Average snowy days (≥ 0.1 in)	14.7	12.3	11.0	4.8	0.3	0.0	0.0	0.0	0.0	1.3	7.1	14.1	65.6
Source: NOAA

Rangeley has another weather station near the Stephen A. Bean Municipal Airport.

Climate data for Rangeley 2 NW, Maine, 1991–2020 normals, extremes 1997–present: 1780ft (543m)
Month	Jan	Feb	Mar	Apr	May	Jun	Jul	Aug	Sep	Oct	Nov	Dec	Year
Record high °F (°C)	55 (13)	65 (18)	74 (23)	83 (28)	90 (32)	90 (32)	90 (32)	89 (32)	91 (33)	77 (25)	70 (21)	59 (15)	91 (33)
Mean maximum °F (°C)	45.2 (7.3)	45.8 (7.7)	52.9 (11.6)	70.5 (21.4)	81.5 (27.5)	83.8 (28.8)	85.7 (29.8)	83.5 (28.6)	80.3 (26.8)	70.6 (21.4)	60.9 (16.1)	48.6 (9.2)	87.1 (30.6)
Mean daily maximum °F (°C)	21.9 (−5.6)	24.6 (−4.1)	33.4 (0.8)	46.4 (8.0)	60.7 (15.9)	69.8 (21.0)	74.6 (23.7)	73.2 (22.9)	65.6 (18.7)	52.2 (11.2)	39.2 (4.0)	27.9 (−2.3)	49.1 (9.5)
Daily mean °F (°C)	12.0 (−11.1)	14.1 (−9.9)	22.5 (−5.3)	36.0 (2.2)	49.2 (9.6)	58.6 (14.8)	63.6 (17.6)	61.9 (16.6)	54.5 (12.5)	42.7 (5.9)	31.0 (−0.6)	19.5 (−6.9)	38.8 (3.8)
Mean daily minimum °F (°C)	2.2 (−16.6)	3.5 (−15.8)	11.6 (−11.3)	25.6 (−3.6)	37.6 (3.1)	47.5 (8.6)	52.7 (11.5)	50.6 (10.3)	43.3 (6.3)	33.2 (0.7)	22.8 (−5.1)	11.0 (−11.7)	28.5 (−2.0)
Mean minimum °F (°C)	−16.4 (−26.9)	−14.1 (−25.6)	−10.5 (−23.6)	12.2 (−11.0)	26.5 (−3.1)	35.0 (1.7)	42.5 (5.8)	39.9 (4.4)	29.4 (−1.4)	21.9 (−5.6)	5.8 (−14.6)	−9.2 (−22.9)	−19.2 (−28.4)
Record low °F (°C)	−28 (−33)	−24 (−31)	−21 (−29)	4 (−16)	21 (−6)	27 (−3)	35 (2)	31 (−1)	21 (−6)	13 (−11)	−8 (−22)	−21 (−29)	−28 (−33)
Average precipitation inches (mm)	2.58 (66)	2.06 (52)	2.67 (68)	3.04 (77)	3.64 (92)	4.50 (114)	4.30 (109)	3.83 (97)	3.58 (91)	4.40 (112)	3.07 (78)	3.12 (79)	40.79 (1,035)
Average snowfall inches (cm)	24.5 (62)	26.1 (66)	21.8 (55)	7.9 (20)	0.6 (1.5)	0.0 (0.0)	0.0 (0.0)	0.0 (0.0)	0.0 (0.0)	2.8 (7.1)	9.1 (23)	24.8 (63)	117.6 (297.6)
Average extreme snow depth inches (cm)	18.6 (47)	24.5 (62)	24.1 (61)	14.0 (36)	0.2 (0.51)	0.0 (0.0)	0.0 (0.0)	0.0 (0.0)	0.0 (0.0)	1.2 (3.0)	5.5 (14)	15.8 (40)	26.7 (68)
Average precipitation days (≥ 0.01 in)	15.5	13.4	13.2	12.7	14.5	16.1	15.3	13.5	12.1	15.0	14.0	18.0	173.3
Average snowy days (≥ 0.1 in)	15.6	13.1	11.6	5.4	0.5	0.0	0.0	0.0	0.0	1.5	7.5	15.7	70.9
Source 1: NOAA
Source 2: XMACIS (mean maxima/minima 2006–2020)

== Demographics ==
Historical population
Census	Pop.	Note	%±
1860	238		—
1870	313		31.5%
1880	563		79.9%
1890	616		9.4%
1900	961		56.0%
1910	1,154		20.1%
1920	1,028		−10.9%
1930	1,472		43.2%
1940	1,464		−0.5%
1950	1,228		−16.1%
1960	1,087		−11.5%
1970	941		−13.4%
1980	1,023		8.7%
1990	1,063		3.9%
2000	1,052		−1.0%
2010	1,168		11.0%
2020	1,222		4.6%
U.S. Decennial Census

=== 2010 census ===
As of the census of 2010, there were 1,168 people, 575 households, and 338 families residing in the town. The population density was 28.2 inhabitants per square mile (10.9/km^{2}). There were 1,829 housing units at an average density of 44.1 per square mile (17.0/km^{2}). The racial makeup of the town was 98.4% White, 0.5% Asian, 0.6% from other races, and 0.5% from two or more races. Hispanic or Latino of any race were 1.0% of the population.

There were 575 households, of which 19.7% had children under the age of 18 living with them, 47.1% were married couples living together, 7.7% had a female householder with no husband present, 4.0% had a male householder with no wife present, and 41.2% were non-families. Of all households, 34.1% were made up of individuals, and 16.1% had someone living alone who was 65 years of age or older. The average household size was 2.03 and the average family size was 2.56.

The median age in the town was 51.4 years. 16.2% of residents were under the age of 18; 4.8% were between the ages of 18 and 24; 18.1% were from 25 to 44; 35.6% were from 45 to 64; and 25.2% were 65 years of age or older. The gender makeup of the town was 50.8% male and 49.2% female.

=== 2000 census ===
As of the 2000 census, there were 1,052 people, 468 households, and 292 families residing in the town. The population density was 25.3 people per square mile (9.8 people/km^{2}). There were 1,561 housing units at an average density of 37.5 per square mile (14.5/km^{2}). The racial makeup of the town was 99.24% White, 0.10% Black or African American, 0.10% Native American, 0.10% from other races, and 0.48% from two or more races. Hispanic or Latino of any race were 0.19% of the population.

There were 468 households, out of which 24.1% had children under the age of 18 living with them, 51.9% were married couples living together, 7.1% had a female householder with no husband present, and 37.6% were non-families. Of all households, 30.3% were made up of individuals, and 14.1% had someone living alone who was 65 years of age or older. The average household size was 2.24 individuals and the average family size was 2.79 people.

In the town, the population was spread out, with 21.3% under the age of 18; 4.4% from 18 to 24; 25.3% from 25 to 44; 28.3% from 45 to 64; and 20.7% who were 65 years of age or older. The median age was 44 years. For every 100 females, there were 100.4 males. For every 100 females age 18 and over, there were 97.1 males.

The median income for a household in the town was $33,382, and the median income for a family was $43,250. Males had a median income of $32,426 versus $19,519 for females. The per capita income for the town was $19,052. About 9.3% of families and 11.7% of the population were below the poverty line, including 15.0% of those under age 18 and 10.1% of those age 65 or over.

== Notable people ==
- Wilhelm Reich, psychiatrist
- Bing Russell, actor
- Kurt Russell, actor
- Arlo West, musician and photographer
