= Mooselookmeguntic Lake =

Lake in Maine, United States

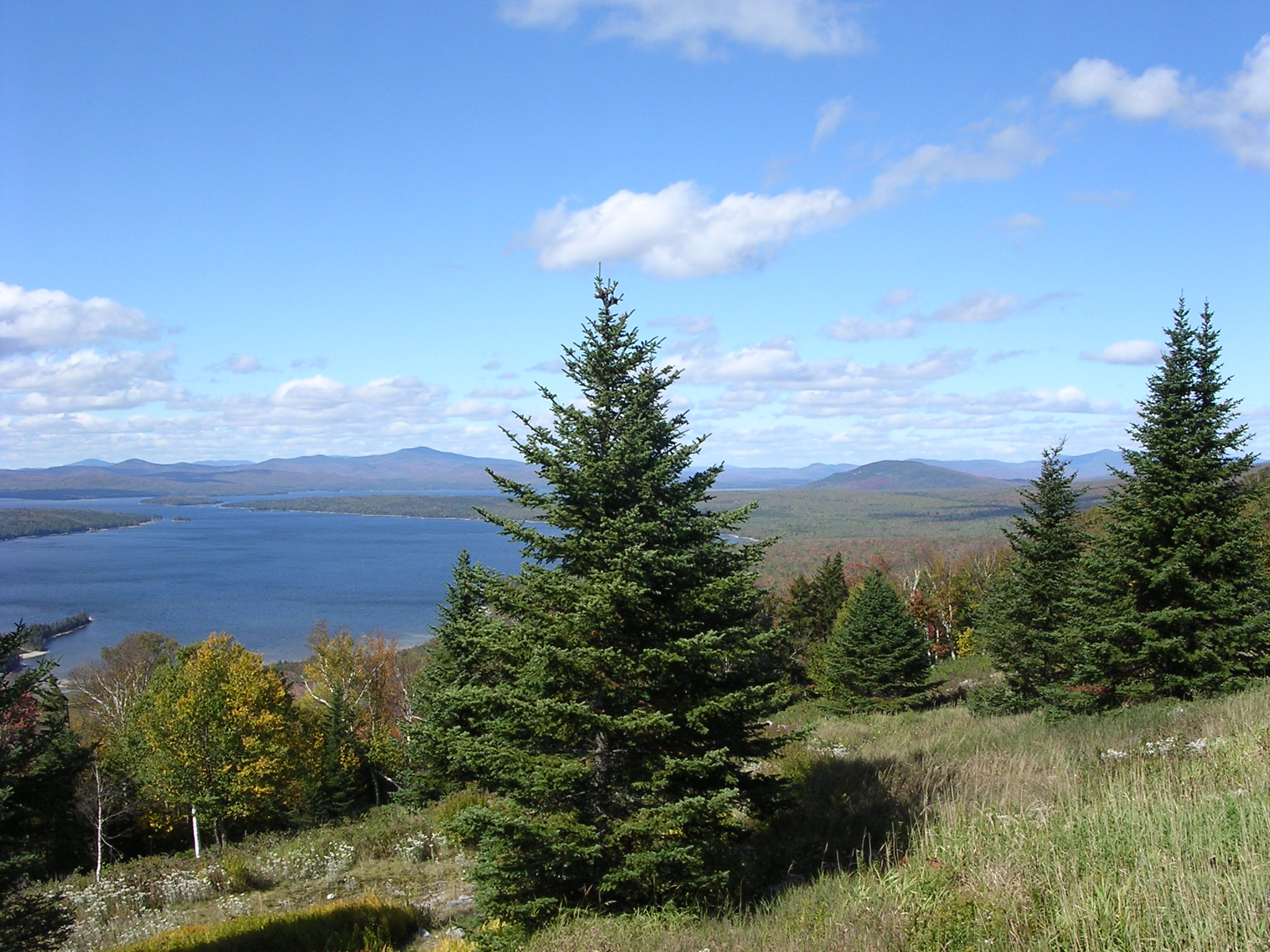
- Mooselookmeguntic Lake from a scenic overlook on Maine State Route 17

- Location within Maine Location within the United States
- Location: Franklin / Oxford counties, Maine, United States
- Coordinates: 44°54′18″N 70°48′32″W
- Type: mesotrophic
- Catchment area: 389 sq mi (1,010 km^{2})
- Basin countries: United States
- Surface area: 16,300 acres (6,600 ha)
- Average depth: 60 ft (18 m)
- Max. depth: 132 ft (40 m)
- Water volume: 562,121 acre⋅ft (693,366,000 m^{3})
- Residence time: 1.1 years
- Shore length^{1}: 57.5 mi (92.5 km)
- Surface elevation: 1,467 ft (447 m)
- Islands: Toothaker Island, Students Island
- ^{1} Shore length is not a well-defined measure.

Mooselookmeguntic Lake is located in Franklin County and Oxford County, Maine, in the United States. It is part of the Androscoggin River watershed. It is located in the western part of Maine, near the border with the state of New Hampshire and the Canadian province of Quebec. The lake is just a few miles from the Appalachian Trail.

There are two islands in the southern portion of Mooselookmeguntic Lake called "Toothaker Island" and "Students Island".

== Name ==
The name "Mooselookmeguntic" is an Abnaki word for "moose feeding place." Variant names listed by the USGS include "Mooselocmaguntic Lake" and "Mooselookmeguntick Lake".

== Hydrology ==
Mooselookmeguntic Lake receives water from several sources. The Cupsuptic River flows into Cupsuptic Lake, which is directly connected with the northern part of Mooselookmeguntic Lake. The Rangeley River and Kennebago River both flow into northeastern Mooselookmeguntic Lake.

The lake's waters flow out to the southwest, into Upper Richardson Lake. There is a dam between the two lakes called "Upper Dam".

Upper Dam, first constructed in 1850 raised the level of Mooselookmeguntic Lake about 6 feet, causing it to become joined to Cupsuptic Lake forming a reservoir. The two lakes had been separate before the dam was built. Upper Dam was rebuilt once in the late 1800s and most recently from 2012 to 2016.

Mooselookmeguntic Lake's maximum depth is 132 feet (40 m) and its surface area is 25.5 square miles (66 km^{2}). It is the sixth largest lake in Maine. Mooselookmeguntic Lake's elevation is 1,467 feet (447 meters) above sea level.

== Environment ==
The lake has a variety of fish, and is a popular tourist attraction for fishing. It is surrounded by the Stephen Phillips Memorial Preserve protected wilderness area.

== In literature ==
Lake Mooselookmeguntic is the location of the action in the book "Magic Thinks Big", an illustrated children's book by Elisha Cooper. The book features paintings of one of the islands in the lake, as well as a panorama of the lake.
