= List of high schools in Maine =

This is a list of high schools in the state of Maine.

== Androscoggin County ==
- Lisbon High School, Lisbon
- Oak Hill High School, Wales
- Poland Regional High School, Poland

=== Auburn ===
- Edward Little High School
- Saint Dominic Academy

=== Lewiston ===
- Lewiston High School
- Lewiston Regional Technical Center

=== Turner ===
- Leavitt Area High School
- Calvary Christian Academy

== Aroostook County ==
- Ashland District School, Ashland
- Central Aroostook High School, Mars Hill
- Easton Senior High School, Easton
- Fort Fairfield High School, Fort Fairfield
- Fort Kent Community High School, Fort Kent
- Hodgdon High School, Hodgdon
- Madawaska High School, Madawaska
- Maine School of Science and Mathematics, Limestone
- Presque Isle High School, Presque Isle
- Southern Aroostook Community School, Dyer Brook
- St. John Valley Technology Center, Frenchville
- Van Buren District High School, Van Buren
- Washburn District High School, Washburn
- Wisdom High School, St. Agatha

=== Caribou ===
- Caribou High School
- Caribou Technology Center

=== Houlton ===
- Greater Houlton Christian Academy
- Houlton High School
- Region Two School of Applied Technology

== Cumberland County ==
- Bridgton Academy, Bridgton
- Bonny Eagle High School, Standish
- Cape Elizabeth High School, Cape Elizabeth
- Falmouth High School, Falmouth
- Freeport High School, Freeport
- Gorham High School, Gorham
- Gray-New Gloucester High School, Gray
- Greely High School, Cumberland
- Pine Tree Academy, Freeport
- Scarborough High School, Scarborough
- South Portland High School, South Portland
- Windham High School, Windham

=== Brunswick ===
- Brunswick High School
- Region 10 Technical High School

=== Naples ===
- Lake Region High School
- Lake Region Vocational Center

=== Portland ===
Public Schools

- Baxter Academy for Technology and Sciences
- Casco Bay High School
- Deering High School
- Portland Arts & Technology High School
- Portland High School

Private Schools

- Cheverus High School
- Waynflete School

=== Westbrook ===
- Westbrook High School
- Westbrook Regional Vocational Center

=== Yarmouth ===
- North Yarmouth Academy
- Yarmouth High School

== Franklin County ==
- Mount Abram Regional High School, Strong
- Rangeley Lakes Regional High School, Rangeley
- Spruce Mountain High School, Jay

=== Farmington ===
- Foster Career and Technical Education Center
- Mount Blue High School

== Hancock County ==
- Bucksport High School, Bucksport
- Deer Isle-Stonington High School, Deer Isle
- George Stevens Academy, Blue Hill
- Mount Desert Island High School, Bar Harbor
- Sumner Memorial High School, Sullivan

=== Ellsworth ===
- Ellsworth High School
- Hancock County Technical Center

== Kennebec County ==
- Erskine Academy, China
- Gardiner Area High School, Gardiner
- Hall-Dale High School, Farmingdale
- Kents Hill School, Kents Hill
- Maranacook Community High School, Readfield
- Messalonskee High School, Oakland
- Monmouth Academy, Monmouth
- Waterville Senior High School, Waterville
- Winslow High School, Winslow
- Winthrop High School, Winthrop

=== Augusta ===
- Capital Area Technical Center
- Cony High School
- Maine Arts Academy

== Knox County ==
- Camden Hills Regional High School, Rockport
- North Haven High School, North Haven
- Vinalhaven High School, Vinalhaven

=== Rockland ===
- Oceanside High School
- Mid-Coast School of Technology

== Lincoln County ==
- Boothbay Region High School, Boothbay Harbor
- Lincoln Academy, Newcastle
- Medomak Valley High School, Waldoboro
- Wiscasset High School, Wiscasset

== Oxford County ==
- Buckfield Senior High School, Buckfield
- Dirigo High School, Dixfield
- Fryeburg Academy, Fryeburg
- Hebron Academy, Hebron
- Mountain Valley High School, Rumford
- Sacopee Valley High School, Hiram
- School of Applied Technology, Mexico

=== Bethel ===
- Gould Academy
- Telstar High School

=== Paris ===
- Oxford Hills Comprehensive High School
- Oxford Hills Technical School

== Penobscot County ==
- Brewer High School, Brewer
- Central High School, Corinth
- Dexter Regional High School, Dexter
- Hampden Academy, Hampden
- Hermon High School, Hermon
- Katahdin High School, Stacyville
- Lee Academy, Lee
- Nokomis Regional High School, Newport
- Old Town High School, Old Town
- Orono High School, Orono
- Penobscot Valley High School, Howland
- Schenck High School, East Millinocket
- Stearns High School, Millinocket
- Tri-County Technical Center, Dexter

=== Bangor ===
==== Public ====
- Bangor High School
- United Technologies Center

==== Private ====
- Bangor Christian High School
- John Bapst Memorial High School

=== Lincoln ===
- Mattanawcook Academy
- Northern Penobscot Technical Center

== Piscataquis County ==
- Foxcroft Academy, Dover-Foxcroft
- Greenville High School, Greenville
- Piscataquis Community High School, Guilford
- Penquis Valley High School, Milo

== Sagadahoc County ==
- Mount Ararat High School, Topsham
- Richmond High School, Richmond
- Chop Point School, Woolwich

=== Bath ===
- Bath Regional Career and Technical Center
- Hyde School
- Morse High School

== Somerset County ==
- Carrabec High School, North Anson
- Forest Hills High School, Jackman
- Lawrence High School, Fairfield
- Madison Junior Senior High School, Madison
- Maine Central Institute, Pittsfield
- Upper Kennebec Valley Memorial High School, Bingham

=== Skowhegan ===
- Skowhegan Area High School
- Somerset Career and Technical Center

== Waldo County ==
- Islesboro High School, Isleboro
- Mount View High School, Thorndike
- Searsport District High School, Searsport

=== Belfast ===
- Belfast Area High School
- Waldo County Technical Center

== Washington County ==
- East Grand High School, Danforth
- Jonesport-Beals High School, Jonesport
- Narraguagus High School, Harrington
- Shead High School, Eastport
- Washington Academy, East Machias
- Woodland Senior High School, Baileyville

=== Calais ===
- Calais High School
- St. Croix Regional Technical Center

=== Machias ===
- Coastal Washington County Institute of Technology
- Machias Memorial High School

== York County ==
- Kennebunk High School, Kennebunk
- Massabesic High School, Waterboro
- Noble High School, North Berwick
- Old Orchard Beach High School, Old Orchard Beach
- Robert William Traip Academy, Kittery
- Thornton Academy, Saco
- Wells High School, Wells
- York High School, York

=== Biddeford ===
- Biddeford High School
- Biddeford Regional Center of Technology

=== Sanford ===
- Sanford Christian Academy
- Sanford High School
- Sanford Regional Technical Center

=== South Berwick ===
- Berwick Academy
- Marshwood High School

== See also ==
- List of school districts in Maine
