= Mt. Ararat High School =

Location
- 68 Eagles Way; Topsham, Maine; United States; 43°56′26″N 69°57′53″W

Information
- Type: Public secondary
- Established: 1973
- School district: M.S.A.D. 75
- Principal: Chris Hoffman
- Teaching staff: 60.00 (FTE)
- Grades: 9–12
- Enrollment: 732 (2024–2025)
- Student to teacher ratio: 12.20
- Colors: Blue, Red, and White
- Mascot: Eagle
- Rivals: Brunswick High School; Morse High School
- Accreditation: New England Association of Schools and Colleges
- Website: mta.link75.org

Mt. Ararat High School is a high school in Topsham, Maine, United States. It is part of Maine School Administrative District 75 and it is the only high school in that district.

== History ==
In 1973, Mt. Ararat High School, then known as Mt. Ararat School, and assigned building number 73 to commemorate the year of launch, opened for the students of its four sending towns: Bowdoin, Bowdoinham, Harpswell, and Topsham, Maine. For the first 22 years of its existence, the school provided education to students in grades 7-12. Starting in fall 1995, due to overcrowding, middle school students in grades 7 and 8 attended school at a newly formed Mt. Ararat Middle School, first housed in the old Brunswick High School building, in the nearby town of Brunswick. At that time, the name of the original school was changed to Mt. Ararat High School. In 2001, middle school students, faculty, and staff moved into a new building, now the Mt. Ararat Middle School. The name Mt. Ararat School was taken from the name of the hill that lies behind the school, the site of a fire tower, with a cell tower at its crest. The old school's address of 73 Eagles Way, was first used in the late 1990s, which remained the name of the old school's address until it was demolished in 2020. The name was in honor of the school's inaugural year and the school's mascot.

In August 2010, MSAD No. 75 received acceptance on an application to the state to either renovate or build a new high school. The then superintendent, Brad Smith, presented the district as hoping to be eligible for building a new school. The location for the new high school was to be the athletic fields. The plans for the new high school were approved in 2017 and construction began in 2018. On September 8, 2020 the new Mt. Ararat High School opened its doors to students for the first time.

The new Mt. Ararat High School was completed in 2020, and the former building was demolished that same year.

== Students and faculty ==
As of 2021, Mt. Ararat High School has approximately 865 students and 126 faculty members. The principal is Dr. Chris Hoffman, and the two assistant principals are currently Mr. Deron Sharp and Ms. Jessica Belanger. The Athletic Director is Heidi Wright.

== Notable alumni ==
- Linda Greenlaw, author and boat captain
- Mark Rogers, former MLB baseball player
- Carter Smith, movie director whose first film, Bugcrush was filmed at the school, later went on to direct The Ruins
- Robert Card, US army soldier and mass shooter gunman; perpetrator of the deadliest shooting in the history of Maine
- Chris Hoffman, current principal

== School colors and mascot ==
Mt. Ararat High School's colors are royal blue, red, and white. Its mascot is the bald eagle.

== Athletics ==
The school is a member of the Kennebec Valley Athletic Conference, and touts a fierce rivalry with Brunswick High School, located on the other side of the Androscoggin River. As well as a rivalry with Morse High School.

Men's soccer - The men's soccer team has reached the Class A State Final six times. The team took home the gold ball in 1994 with a victory over Portland, and in 2003 with a victory over Scarborough.

| Date | Opponent | Result |
|---|---|---|
| 1987 | Cape Elizabeth High School | L: 0-2 |
| 1994 | Portland High School | W: 1-0 |
| 2001 | Cheverus High School | L: 1-2 |
| 2003 | Scarborough High School | W: 1-0 (Penalty Kicks) |
| 2005 | Scarborough High School | L: 0-1 (Penalty Kicks) |
| 2012 | Scarborough High School | L: 0-4 |

Women's Soccer - The women's soccer team has reached the Class A State Final ten times, coming away with the state title seven times. The most recent title came in 2003 with a victory over Greely.

| Date | Opponent | Result |
|---|---|---|
| 1985 | Waterville High School | W: 1-0 |
| 1987 | Gorham High School | W: 1-0 |
| 1989 | Cape Elizabeth High School | L: 0-1 |
| 1990 | Westbrook High School | L: 0-2 |
| 1991 | Greely High School | W: 2-1 |
| 1992 | Cape Elizabeth High School | W: 4-1 |
| 1993 | Greely High School | W: 4-0 |
| 2001 | Edward Little High School | W: 1-0 |
| 2003 | Greely High School | W: 1-0 |
| 2006 | Gorham High School | L: 0-1 |

Men's Baseball - The Eagles have reached the Class A State Title game three times. In 2004, Mt. Ararat pitcher Mark Rogers was drafted 5th overall by the Milwaukee Brewers in the Major League Baseball Draft and was also the 2004 National Gatorade Player of the Year.

| Date | Opponent | Result |
|---|---|---|
| 2003 | Deering High School | L: 1-9 |
| 2004 | Deering High School | L: 1-6 |
| 2025 | Biddeford High School | L: 6-7 |

Softball - The Eagles reached the Maine State Class A title game twice.

| Date | Opponent | Result |
|---|---|---|
| 1977 | Winslow High School | L: 11-15 (Extra Innings) |
| 1978 | Brewer High School | W: 9-1 |

Women's Track & Field - The Eagles have won three different Maine State Class A Titles, coming in 1975, 1992, and 2005. Cuyler Goodwin holds the state record in the Girls 400 m dash (57.17) set in 1994. Jen Moreau held the 1600 m run (4:57.27) record for 10 years until it was broken in 2009 by Abbey Leonardi of Kennebunk with a time of 4:56.64. Additionally, the Eagles have won three different Maine State Class A Indoor titles, coming in 1993, 1994, and 1997. Cuyler Goodwin holds the retired 300-yard state record of 37.37.

Women's cross-country - The women's cross-country team has won two state titles, winning in 1992 and 2004. They have also had three individual Class A state champions: Theresa Lewis in 1982, and twin sisters Jessie Wilcox and Beth Wilcox in 2003 and 2004, respectively.

Men's cross-country – The men's two cross-country team state titles came in 1994 and 2019. Andy Caron won the individual Class A state title in 1999, and Lisandro Berry-Gaviria won in three consecutive years from 2017-2019, a feat accomplished by no other male Class A cross-country runner since 1979. Gymnastics - Though the Eagles have never won a state title, they did have two "All-Around" champions. In 1996, Heather Burke took home the honor, and in 1997, Brianna Fuller did the same.

Men's tennis - Though they have not won a state title, the Eagles' Mike Hill won three Men's Singles state championship titles (2007, 2008, and 2009). Nick Mathieu won back to back Class A State Singles titles in 2016 and 2017, while also visited the finals in both 2014 and 2015.

Women's tennis - The women's tennis team reached the Maine State Class A final match three different times, claiming victory twice. In 2004, they defeated Deering High School, and in 2005, they repeated, defeating Deering High School again. The Eagles finished as runners-up in 2001 to Lewiston High School.

Wrestling - In 1996, the Eagles finished as the Class A State runner-up, falling to Bonny Eagle High School in the state final. A lot of individual wrestlers go to the state championship. In 2019 and 2022 the combined Mt. Ararat/Brunswick wrestling team became Class A State champions.

Women's lacrosse - The women's lacrosse team reached the Maine State Class A Final in 2010, falling to Scarborough High School 11–7. In 2025, the Eagles reached the Maine State Class B Final, falling to Freeport High School 11-9.

Football - The Football team reached the Maine State Class 8 Man state championship in 2019, winning their first ever football state title over Old Orchard Beach High school 58-25. Mt. Ararat's Holden Brannan rushed for over 300 yards with 7 touchdowns.

Women's Basketball - In 2025, the women's basketball team reached their first Maine State Class A Final, beating Hampden Academy 43-31, winning the school's first state championship in men's or women's basketball.
