= Kennebec Valley Athletic Conference =

Kennebec Valley Athletic Conference (KVAC)
- Association: Maine Principals' Association
- Director: Doran Stout
- President: Nathan Priest
- No. of teams: 27
- Region: Maine; Kennebec Valley; Maine Highlands; Mid-Coast; Southern Maine Coast
- Website: www.kvacsports.com

The Kennebec Valley Athletic Conference (KVAC) is a high school athletic organization, featuring schools from the towns that surround the Kennebec River in the state of Maine. It is the largest athletic conference in the state with 27 different schools as members.

== Member schools ==
The KVAC consists of 27 different schools, which are divided into two divisions in three different classes (Class A, Class B, & Class C) in coordination with the Maine Principals' Association (MPA). Membership includes:

Soccer/Baseball/Softball

CLASS A	CLASS B	CLASS C
Bangor	Belfast	Mt. View
Brewer	Gardiner	Winslow
Brunswick	Leavitt	Maine Central Institute
Edward Little	Erskine	
Hampden	Medomak	
Lewiston	Oceanside	
Messalonskee	Nokomis	
Mt. Ararat	Lawrence	
Mt. Blue	Morse	
Oxford Hills	Cony	
Camden Hills	Lincoln	
	Skowhegan	
	Waterville	

Basketball

CLASS AA	CLASS A	CLASS B
Bangor (N)	Belfast (N)	Maine Central Institute (N)
Edward Little (N)	Oceanside (N)	Mt. View (N)
Lewiston (N)	Waterville (N)	Winslow (N)
Oxford Hills (N)	Cony (N)	
Brewer(N)	Erskine (N)	
Hampden (N)	Gardiner (N)	
Messalonskee (N)	Lincoln (S)	
Mt. Ararat (S)	Lawrence (N)	
Brunswick (S)	Leavitt (S)	
Camden Hills (N)	Medomak Valley (N)	
Mt. Blue (N)	Morse (S)	
Skowhegan (N)	Nokomis (N)	

In conjunction with the MPA and its member schools, the KVAC administers the following sports: Football, Soccer, Field Hockey, Golf, Cross Country, Cheerleading, Basketball, Indoor Track, Skiing, Swimming, Wrestling, Ice Hockey, Baseball, Softball, Tennis, Outdoor Track, and Lacrosse. Members schools and athletes compete for team and individual conference championship status between the end of the regular season and the start of the MPA playoffs.

Membership drastically changed in the early-mid 2000s when schools switched regions and classes. In the late 1990s and early 2000s, Class A membership included Waterville, Lawrence, Skowhegan, Mt. Blue, Messalonskee, Cony, Medomak Valley, and Gardiner as Eastern Maine schools and Brunswick, Morse, Mt. Ararat, Oxford Hills, and Leavitt as Western Maine schools in sports like basketball. The five Western Maine schools were moved into Eastern Maine for the 2001–02 season. This was due to two reasons. One, enrollment at EM schools in more northern parts of the state were dropping and schools like Stearns, Caribou, and later Presque Isle were moving down to Class B (all the way down to Class D in the case of Stearns). Another reason was the MPA's failed four division format where Eastern and Western Maine were split into north–south divisions. That format lasted one year. Edward Little and Lewiston, former members of the Southwestern Maine Activities Association, joined in 2003. That move was followed by the decision to move those schools to Eastern Maine. The KVAC also gained former Class A members of the Big East/Penobscot Valley Conference from the Bangor area in 2005 when that league was forced to disband due to loss of membership. 5 schools, Bangor High School, Brewer High School, Nokomis Regional High School, Old Town High School, and Hampden Academy, joined. Bangor, Brewer, and Hampden continue to be members of the Class A division, while Nokomis moved to Class B, and Old Town moved to Class B, but returned to the Big East/PVC. Erskine has jumped between Classes A and B since 2005 but will move back to B in 2013. Gardiner moved to Class B in 2007. Leavitt and Nokomis dropped to B in 2009, with Leavitt moving to the West. Morse dropped from EM Class A to WM Class B in 2011. Rockland District High School merged with nearby Georges Valley High School in 2011 to form Oceanside East/West High School. Oak Hill High School was a Class B member until 2012 when they moved to the Mountain Valley Conference, a Class B/C league in the western mountains. Erskine moved to Class B in 2013, and Maranacook to Class C. Spruce Mountain High School of Jay, a member of the Mountain Valley Conference, briefly joined the league in 2014 school year, but then returned to the MVC in 2017. In 2022 Maranacook moved to the MVC.

Starting with the 2015–16 season, basketball will be divided into five classes and into north and south regions.

The KVAC also holds an annual banquet in May to recognize 10 Senior Scholars from each of its member schools.

== Cross-Country ==
=== Class A Champions ===
==== Women ====
Year	Team Champions		Team Runner-Up		Individual Champion	
Year	School	Points	School	Points	Athlete, School	Time
2021	Bangor High School	52	Brunswick High School	64	Megan Randall, Bangor	20:18.4
2020	Bangor High School	36	Mt. Ararat High School	91	Erin McCarthy, Bangor	20:25
2019	Camden Hills Regional High School	57	Bangor High School	83	Lidia Gilmore, Bangor	19:58.3
2018	Camden Hills Regional High School	58	Mt. Ararat High School	90	Jillian Richardson, Edward Little	19:27.8
2017	Camden Hills Regional High School	40	Mt. Ararat High School	55	Grace Iltis, Camden	19:56.3
2016	Brunswick High School	74	Mt. Blue High School	89	Katherine Leckbee, Mt. Ararat	19:44.2
2015	Mt. Blue High School	71	Brunswick High School	72	Anne Guadalupi, Cony	20:23.2
2014	Hampden Academy	61	Brunswick High School	64	Anne Guadalupi, Cony	20:30.6
2013	Hampden Academy	52	Brunswick High School	65	Teresa Murphy, Brunswick	20:40.4
2012	Mt. Ararat High School	57	Brunswick High School	61	Erzsebet Nagy, Lawrence	19:27.0
2011	Brunswick High School	42	Mt. Ararat High School	43	Erzsebet Nagy, Lawrence	19:55.8
2010	Mt. Ararat High School	27	Brunswick High School	75	Kathleen McMahon, Brunswick	19:55.9
2009	Mt. Ararat High School	54	Mt. Blue High School	63	Kate Spies, Mt. Ararat	20:12.8
2008	Brewer High School	60	Mt. Blue High School	66	Melody Lam, Mt. Blue	20:37.5
2007	Brunswick High School	33	Brewer High School	56	Silver Hunt, Mt. Blue	20:34.9
2006	Brunswick High School	24	Mt. Ararat High School	51	Anna Ackerman, Cony	20:45.31
2005	Brunswick High School	51	Mt. Ararat High School	51	Krystal Douglas, Mt. Ararat	19:37.16
2004	Mt. Ararat High School	45	Mt. Blue High School	54	Elizabeth Wilcox, Mt. Ararat	19:43.56
2003	Mt. Blue High School	70	Waterville High School	82	Lily Hanstein, Mt. Blue	19:52.7
2002			Mt. Ararat High School			
2001	Mt. Blue High School	33	Cony High School	92	Erin Archard, Mt. Blue	18:48.6
1998	Mt. Blue High School	41	Mt. Ararat High School	75		

==== Men ====
Year	Team Champions		Team Runner-Up		Individual Champion	
Year	School	Points	School	Points	Athlete, School	Time
2021	Brunswick High School	51	Hampden Academy	67	Abbott Valentine, Hampden	16:11.0
2020	Bangor High School	37	Mt. Ararat High School	56	Tyler Patterson, Brunswick	16:46
2019	Mt. Ararat High School	34	Brunswick High School	54	Lisandry Berry-Gaviria, Mt. Ararat	16:18.5
2018	Bangor High School	45	Brunswick High School	55	Lisandro Berry-Gaviria, Mt. Ararat	16:33.5
2017	Hampden Academy	52	Bangor High School	76	Lisandro Berry-Gaviria, Mt. Ararat	17:05.1
2016	Mt. Blue High School	74	Hampden Academy	88	Tucker Barber, Mt. Blue	16:43.2
2015	Hampden Academy	77	Bangor High School	102	Osman Doorow, Lewiston	16:38.1
2014	Hampden Academy	53	Mt. Blue High School	75	Aaron Willingham, Mt. Blue	16:56.5
2013	Bangor High School	72	Lewiston High School	86	Josh Horne, Mt. Blue	17:05.4
2012	Lewiston High School	47	Mt. Blue High School	82	Justin Tracy, Mt. Blue	17:14.1
2011	Mt. Ararat High School	80	Bangor High School	89	Harlow Ladd, Messalonskee	17:28.3
2010	Mt. Ararat High School	56	Mt. Blue High School	70	Harlow Ladd, Messalonskee	17:14.0
2009	Edward Little High School	65	Brunswick High School	84	Will Geoghegan, Brunswick	16:09.5
2008	Lewiston High School	60	Brunswick High School	97	Will Geoghegan, Brunswick	16:44.3
2007	Lewiston High School	47	Mt. Blue High School	87	Mohamed Noor, Lewiston	16:37.7
2006	Edward Little High School	56	Brunswick High School	62	Eric Marceau, Mt. Blue	17:04.23
2005	Mt. Blue High School	61	Lewiston High School	64	Adam Deveau, Mt. Blue	17:03.99
2004	Mt. Blue High School	55	Morse High School	60	Adam Deveau, Mt. Blue	17:20.36
2003	Edward Little High School	65	Morse High School	67	Sam Fletcher, Edward Little	16:38.3
2002	Mt. Blue High School	57	Cony High School	84	Matt Dunlap, Mt. Blue	16:37
2001	Mt. Ararat High School	47	Mt. Blue High School	61	Aaron Norton, Morse	15:48

=== Class B Champions ===
==== Women ====
Year	Team Champions		Team Runner-Up		Individual Champion	
Year	School	Points	School	Points	Athlete, School	Time
2021	Lincoln Academy	55	Cony High School	57	Abby Williams, Waterville	21:21.9
2020	Waterville High School	54	Morse High School	64	Olivia Tiner, Winslow	20:33.22
2019	Medomak Valley High School	53	Maranacook Community High School	58	Olivia Tiner, Winslow	21:27.4
2018	Maranacook Community High School	35	Medomak Valley High School	92	Molly McGrail, Maranacook	20:32.3
2017	Maranacook Community High School	26	Morse High School	71	Olivia Tiner, Winslow	20:41.0
2016	Maranacook Community High School	45	Camden Hills Regional High School	63	Molly McGrail, Maranacook	20:40.0
2015	Waterville High School	52	Maranacook Community High School	75	Lauren Brown, Waterville	19:52.4
2014	Morse High School	54	Maranacook Community High School	61	Hannah Despres, Maranacook	21:34.8
2013	Maranacook Community High School	56	Camden Hills Regional High School	84	Abby Hersom, Oceanside	20:49.8
2012	Camden Hills Regional High School	31	Waterville High School	55	Bethanie Brown, Waterville	18:59.4
2011	Camden Hills Regional High School	37	Waterville High School	77	Bethanie Brown, Waterville	20:02.0
2010	Hampden Academy	61	Winslow High School	77	Brittany Bowman, Camden Hills	20:46.6
2009	Medomak Valley High School	54	Maranacook Community High School	77	Abby Mace, Maranacook	19:03.1
2008	Medomak Valley High School	61	Leavitt Area High School	63	Abby Mace, Maranacook	19:24.9
2007	Maranacook Community High School	50	Leavitt Area High School	55	Kasey Eaton, Medomak	20:37.7
2006	Waterville High School	44	Maranacook Community High School	49	Megan Nealey, Belfast	20:04.00
2005	Maranacook Community High School	42	Waterville High School	43	Abby Pullen, Maranacook	19:49.04
2004	Maranacook Community High School	38	Belfast High School	53	Jennifer Monsulick, Maranacook	20:20.57
2003	Camden Hills Regional High School	46	Lincoln Academy	53	Rebecca Twaddel, Camden Hills	20:03.6
2002	Leavitt Area High School	40	Medomak Valley High School	68	Nicole Rodrigue, Camden Hills Regional High School	20:11.00
2001	Camden Hills Regional High School	36	Medomak Valley High School	47		

==== Men ====
Year	Team Champions		Team Runner-Up		Individual Champion	
Year	School	Points	School	Points	Athlete, School	Time
2025	Lincoln Academy	36	Morse High School	62	Levi Riggs, Morse High School	16:37.50
2024	Morse High School	65	Lincoln Academy	73	Levi Riggs, Morse High School	17:38.81
2023	Lincoln Academy	45	Cony High School	62	Eliot O'Mahoney, Lincoln Academy	17:23.00
2022	Lincoln Academy	51	Morse High School	71	Logan Ouellette, Leavitt Area High School	17:25.10
2021	Cony High School	51	Lincoln Academy	68	Connor Daigle, Medomak Valley High School	16:52.70
2020	Morse High School	27	Lincoln Academy	56	Joshua Way, Waterville High School	17:14.01
2019	Lincoln Academy	29	Morse High School	52	Jarrett Gulden, Lincoln Academy	17:12.60
2018	Lincoln Academy	33	Morse High School	47	Sam Russ, Lincoln Academy	17:26.80
2017	Lincoln Academy	21	Maranacook Community High School	93	Sam Russ, Lincoln Academy	17:44.00
2016	Lincoln Academy	38	Maranacook Community High School	87	Nick Dall, Waterville High School	17:14.50
2015	Waterville High School	55	Belfast Area High School	90	Nick Dall, Waterville High School	17:46.10
2014	Maranacook Community High School	87	Camden Hills Regional High School	91	Harrison Knowlton, Leavitt Area High School	17:34.20
2013	Maranacook Community High School	57	Lincoln Academy	81	Ben Trapani, Camden Hills Regional High School	17:17.50
2012	Maranacook Community High School	57	Winslow High School	89	Ben Trapani, Camden Hills Regional High School	17:09.80
2011	Maranacook Community High School	67	Medomak Valley High School	104	Nickolas Shuckrow, Winslow High School	18:02.30
2010	Hampden Academy	42	Winslow High School	60	Eben Hodgkins, Erskine Academy	17:31.50
2009	Hampden Academy	66	Winslow High School	94	Darik Frye, Hampden Academy	16:26.0
2008	Maranacook Community High School	77	Medomak Valley High School	91	Sam Seekins, Erskine Academy	17:05.9
2007	Medomak Valley High School	48	Leavitt Area High School	65	Michael Howland, Lincoln Academy	17:25.5
2006	Maranacook Community High School	35	Waterville High School	64	Michael Howland, Lincoln Academy	17:08.58
2005	Leavitt Area High School	41	Waterville High School	94	Michael Howland, Lincoln Academy	17:20.11
2004	Camden Hills Regional High School	41	Belfast High School	49	Levi Miller, Belfast Area High School	16:17.34
2003	Lincoln Academy	38	Maranacook Community High School	58	Levi Miller, Belfast Area High School	16:29.50
2001	Belfast Area High School	31	Maranacook Community High School	45	Levi Miller, Belfast Area High School	16:04.60
2000	Belfast Area High School	70	Maranacook Community High School	79	Matt Costello-Hurley, Belfast Area High School	16:45.00
1999	Maranacook Community High School	33	Belfast Area High School	63	Andy Hunter, Maranacook Community High School	16:21.00
1998	Maranacook Community High School	36	Erskine Academy	71	Andy Hunter, Maranacook Community High School	16:20.00
1997	Maranacook Community High School	29	Erskine Academy	60	Eben Albert-Knopp, Maranacook Community High School	16:20.00

==== Men (Wheelchair Race) ====
Year	Individual Champion	Time
2021	Jonathan Schomaker, Leavitt	42:01.9
2020	Jonathan Schomaker, Leavitt	34:54.52
2019	Jonathan Schomaker, Leavitt	47:35.6

== Indoor Track & Field ==
=== Class A Champions ===
==== Men ====
Year	Champions	Runner-up
2012	Edward Little High School (98.5 points)	Mt. Ararat High School (86.5 points)
2011	Edward Little High School (113 points)	Brunswick High School (102 points)
2010	Brunswick High School (206.50 points)	Edward Little High School (126 points)
2009	Brunswick High School (219.50 points)	Edward Little High School (126.50 points)
2008	Brunswick High School (250.50 points)	Edward Little High School (88 points)
2007	Brunswick High School (203 points)	Edward Little High School (168 points)
2006	Lewiston High School (137 points)	Edward Little High School (93 points)
2005	Waterville High School (130 points)	Edward Little High School (111 points)
2004	Waterville High School (123 points)	Brunswick High School (95 points)

==== Women ====
Year	Champions	Runner-up
2012	Brunswick High School (149.5 points)	Mt. Ararat High School (119 points)
2011	Brunswick High School (156 points)	Mt. Ararat High School (134 points)
2010	Brunswick High School (132 points)	Edward Little High School (120 points)
2009	Edward Little High School (136 points)	Brunswick High School (107 points)
2008	Brunswick High School (114.50 points)	Mt. Ararat High School (102.50 points)
2007	Brunswick High School (133.50 points)	Mt. Ararat High School (93 points)
2006	Brunswick High School (112 points)	Waterville High School (102 points)
2005	Brunswick High School (92 points)	Mt. Ararat High School (90 points)
2004	Edward Little High School (96 points)	Brunswick High School (77 points)

=== Class B Champions ===
==== Men ====
Year	Champions	Runner-up
2012	Waterville High School (141 points)	Erskine Academy (79 points)
2011	Waterville High School (155 points)	Erskine Academy (98 points)
2010	Waterville High School (223 points)	Erskine Academy (117 points)
2009	Waterville High School (231 points)	Leavitt Area High School (135 points)
2008	Waterville High School (196 points)	Erskine Academy (123 points)
2007	Waterville High School (240 points)	Winslow High School (168 points)

==== Women ====
Year	Champions	Runner-up
2012	Waterville High School (192 points)	Winslow High School (90.50 points)
2011	Waterville High School (177.50 points)	Winslow High School (91 points)
2010	Waterville High School (224 points)	Winslow High School (117 points)
2009	Winslow High School (144 points)	Waterville High School (128 points)
2008	Waterville High School (173 points)	Rockland High School (46 points)
2007	Waterville High School (190 points)	Belfast High School (52 points)

=== Meet Records ===
==== Women ====
Event	Name	School	Time/Distance	Date
55m Dash	Kim Doucette	Old Orchard Beach High School	7.1h	1989
55m Hurdles	Jesse Labreck	Messalonskee High School	8.40	2008
200m Dash	Kristin Slotnick	Brunswick High School	26.07	2008
400m Dash	Clare Franco	Brunswick High School	59.53	2008
800m Run	Bethanie Brown	Waterville High School	2:17.33	2012
1600m Run	Bethanie Brown	Waterville High School	5:08.09	2012
3200m Run	Joanna Green	Brunswick High School	11:11.0h	1985
4 × 200 m Relay	A Ranucci, L. Clavet, A. Chisholm, J. Masters	Edward Little High School	1:49.72	2012
4 × 800 m Relay	E. Woods, B. Wilcox, J. Wilcox, R. Lebel	Mt. Ararat High School	9:57.95	2004
High Jump	Jesse Labreck	Messalonskee High School	5-05.00	2007
Pole Vault	Bethany Dumas	Cony High School	11–05.50	2007
Long Jump	Kathy Crichton	Brunswick High School	17–06.25	1988
Triple Jump	Shelby Tuttle	Waterville High School	37–04.00	2009
Shot Put	Bethany Karter-O'Brien	Waterville High School	42–06.00	2008

==== Men ====
Event	Name	School	Time/Distance	Date
55m Dash	Sean Droney	Brunswick High School	6.4h	1987
	McKenzie Gary	Mt. Ararat High School	6.59	2011
55m Hurdles	Alan Hunt	Brunswick High School	7.4h	1987
200m Dash	Brett McIntyre	Brunswick High School	22.84	2001
400m Dash	Alex Nichols	Brunswick High School	50.85	2012
800m Run	Will Geoghegan	Brunswick High School	1:57.15	2010
1600m Run	Will Geoghegan	Brunswick High School	4:19.77	2010
3200m Run	Bruce Bickford	Lawrence High School	9:13.0h	1975
4 × 200 m Relay	Breton, Houlk, Barnes, McIntyre	Brunswick High School	1:35.45	2000
4 × 800 m Relay	L. Cassidy, M. Black, P. Horan, W. Geoghegan	Brunswick High School	8:23.21	2010
High Jump	Kevin Sawyer	Lawrence High School	6-09.25	1983
Pole Vault	David Slovenski	Brunswick High School	16–02.00	2008
Long Jump	Sean Droney	Brunswick High School	22–02.25	1989
Triple Jump	Connor Harris	Edward Little High School	45–05.25	2012
Shot Put	Rich Harrison	Brunswick High School	58–05.25	1988

== Outdoor Track & Field ==
=== Class A ===
==== Men ====
Year	Champions	Runner-up
2018	Edward Little High School (177 points)	Lewiston High School (137 points)
2017	Messalonskee High School (133.50 points)	Lewiston High School (106.50 points)
2016	Messalonskee High School (163 points)	Edward Little High School (97.83 points)
2015	Lewiston High School (128 points)	Edward Little High School (113.5 points)
2014	Lewiston High School (163 points)	Edward Little High School (88 points)
2013	Edward Little High School (122.5 points)	Lawrence High School (118 points)
2012	Edward Little High School (125 points)	Lewiston High School (125 points)
2011	Edward Little High School (185.5 points)	Lewiston High School (94 points)
2010	Edward Little High School (126 points)	Brunswick High School (124 points)
2009	Edward Little High School (183.75 points)	Lewiston High School (103.75 points)
2008	Edward Little High School (144 points)	Brunswick High School (108 points)
2007	Edward Little High School (206 points)	Brunswick High School (92 points)
2006	Edward Little High School (170 points)	Lewiston High School (161 points)
2005	Edward Little High School (97 points)	Waterville High School (87 points)
2004	Edward Little High School (80 points)	Waterville High School (74 points)
2003	Waterville High School (133 points)	Morse High School (85 points)
1999	Brunswick High School	

==== Women ====
Year	Champions	Runner-up
2018	Edward Little High School (178 points)	Messalonskee High School (125.50 points)
2017	Edward Little High School (133 points)	Messalonskee High School (132.50 points)
2016	Edward Little High School (183.5 points)	Lewiston High School (119.5 points)
2015	Lewiston High School (125 points)	Edward Little High School (95 points)
2014	Edward Little High School (109 points)	Brunswick High School (106 points)
2013	Lawrence High School (127 points)	Edward Little High School (104 points)
2012	Edward Little High School (163 points)	Brunswick High School (122 points
2011	Edward Little High School (134 points)	Mt. Ararat High School (107 points)
2009	Edward Little High School (211 points)	Mt. Ararat High School (137 points)
2009	Edward Little High School (282 points)	Brunswick High School (90 points)
2008	Edward Little High School (133 points)	Brunswick High School (100 points)
2007	Edward Little High School (154.50 points)	Brunswick High School (120 points)
2006	Brunswick High School (103 points)	Mt. Ararat High School (93 points)
2005	Mt. Ararat High School (117 points)	Edward Little High School (102 points)
2004	Edward Little High School (132 points)	Mt. Blue High School (104 points)
2003	Mt. Blue High School (152 points)	Mt. Ararat High School (101 points)
2001	Brunswick High School	

=== Class B ===
==== Men ====
Year	Champions	Runner-up
2010	Waterville High School (122.5 points)	Erskine Academy (119 points)
2009	Waterville High School (198 points)	Belfast Area High School (111 points)
2008	Waterville High School (163 points)	Maranacook Community School (109 points)
2007	Waterville High School (202.333 points)	Maine Central Institute (100 points)
2006	Waterville High School (125.50 points)	Belfast Area High School (106.50 points)
2005	Belfast Area High School (159 points)	Leavitt Area High School (107 points)
2004	Belfast Area High School (179 points)	Maranacook Community School (81 points)
2003	Belfast Area High School (229 points)	Leavitt Area School (125 points)

==== Women ====
Year	Champions	Runner-up
2010	Waterville High School (211.5 points)	Winslow High School (66 points)
2009	Waterville High School (165 points)	Winslow High School (100 points)
2008	Waterville High School (193 points)	Maine Central Institute (74.33 points)
2007	Waterville High School (171.333 points)	Maine Central Institute (66 points)
2006	Waterville High School (169.50 points)	Maranacook Community School (69.50 points)
2005	Belfast Area High School (126.50 points)	Maranacook Community School (100.50 points)
2004	Belfast Area High School (104 points)	Leavitt Area School (74.50 points)
2003	Belfast Area High School (122 points)	Leavitt Area School (119 points)

== Soccer ==
=== Class A ===
==== Men ====
Year	Winners	Score	Runners-up
2018	Mt. Ararat High School	1-1*	Lewiston High School
2017	Bangor High School		
2015	Lewiston High School	4-3	Hampden Academy
2013	Hampden Academy		Lewiston High School
2012	Hampden Academy	1-0	Mt. Ararat High School
2009	Bangor High School	1-1*	Brunswick High School
2008	Brunswick High School	1–0	Bangor High School
2007	Brunswick High School	2–0	Bangor High School
2006	Bangor High School	2–1	Brunswick High School
2005	Mt. Ararat High School	N/A	Waterville High School
2004	Mt. Ararat High School	2–1	Brunswick High School
2003	Mt. Ararat High School	2–1*	Brunswick High School
2002	Mt. Ararat High School		Lawrence High School
2001	Mt. Ararat High School		
1999	Brunswick High School		
1997	Brunswick High School		
1996	Brunswick High School		
1995	Mt. Ararat High School		
1991	Mt. Ararat High School		
1990	Brunswick High School		
1988	Morse High School		
1987	Brunswick High School		
1986	Brunswick High School		
1985	Mt. Ararat High School		
1984	Brunswick High School		
1981	Brunswick High School		

*No KVAC Game held in 2005. Winner determined by record.
* Decided by Penalty Kicks

==== Women ====
Year	Champion	Score	Runner-up
2012	Bangor High School	2-1 OT (2)-PKs 5-3	Brunswick High School
2011	Bangor High School	4–0	Brunswick High School
2010	Brunswick High School	1–0	Bangor High School
2009	Brunswick High School	2–1	Bangor High School
2008	Waterville High School	2–0	Brunswick High School
2007	Waterville High School	4–0	Mt. Ararat High School
2006	Bangor High School	1–0	Morse High School
2005	Mt. Ararat High School	N/A*	Messalonskee High School
2004	Brunswick High School	3–1	Lewiston High School
2003	Lewiston High School	2–0	Waterville High School
2002	Brunswick High School	2–1	Mt. Ararat High School
2000	Brunswick High School	2-2**	Waterville High School
1999	Brunswick High School	1–0	Mt. Ararat High School
1998	Waterville High School	2–0	Brunswick High School
1997	Brunswick High School	4–1	Waterville High School

*No KVAC Game was held in 2005. The winner is determined by their regular season record.
**Co-KVAC Champions - Due to Tie in the Championship Match

=== Class B Champions ===
==== Men ====
Year	Champion	Score	Runner-up
2011	Camden Hills Regional High School	N/A	Winslow High School
2008	Camden Hills Regional High School	4-1	Medomak Valley High School
2005	Maranacook Community School		

==== Women ====
Year	Champion	Score	Runner-up
2008	Winslow High School	3-2	Medomak Valley High School
1998	Camden Hills Regional High School	3-1	Mt. View High School

== Golf ==
Men's Champions

Year	Champion
1997	Brunswick High School
1981	Brunswick High School
1980	Brunswick High School
1978	Brunswick High School

== Basketball ==
=== Men ===
Year	Champion	Score	Runners-up
2010	Edward Little High School	82–57	Brewer High School
2009	Edward Little High School	71–54	Brewer High School
2006	Brunswick High School		
2005	Oxford Hills Comprehensive High School	57–48	Brunswick High School
2004	Brunswick High School		
2003	Brunswick High School	64–53	Cony High School
2002	Brunswick High School	76–31	Lawrence High School
2001	Brunswick High School		
1959	Brunswick High School		
1958	Brunswick High School		
1957	Brunswick High School		

=== Women ===
Year	Champion	Score	Runners-up
2010	Skowhegan High School	48-41	Edward Little High School
2009	Edward Little High School	48-46	Skowhegan High School
2006	Cony High School		
2003	Cony High School		
2002	Cony High School		
2001	Cony High School		
2000			Cony High School
1999	Cony High School		
1998	Cony High School		
1996	Cony High School		
1995	Cony High School		
1994	Cony High School		
1983	Brunswick High School		
1981	Brunswick High School		
1980	Brunswick High School		
1979	Brunswick High School		
