= School Union 47 =

School district in Maine, United States

Coordinates: 43°52′N 69°47′W

School Union 47 covers five towns in the state of Maine. Included in Union 47 is Arrowsic, Georgetown, Phippsburg, West Bath and Woolwich, Maine. All towns have schools serving grades K–6, with the exception of Woolwich, which serves grades K–8. Union 47's population, as of 2006, is approximately 740 students. The school union has no high school and all Ninth through twelfth grade students go to Morse High School in Bath.
