= Mid-Coast School of Technology =

Location
- 1 Main St. Rockland, Maine; United States
- Coordinates: 44°05′25″N 69°06′35″W

Information
- Type: Public Secondary
- Established: September 1, 1973
- School district: Region 8
- Principal: Robert Deetjen
- Faculty: 29
- Teaching staff: 21
- Colors: Royal Blue and Black
- Website: mcst8.org

The Mid-Coast School of Technology also known as MCST, is a CTE School in the city of Rockland, Maine in the United States.

== Students ==
The Mid-Coast School of Technology mainly supports students from the following local high schools: Camden Hills Regional High School, Oceanside High School - East, Oceanside High School - West, and Medomak Valley High School. MCST also supports a smaller collection of students from Lincoln Academy, Islesboro Central School, North Haven Community School, and Vinalhaven School.

== Programs ==
The Mid-Coast School of Technology offers 17 on-site trade programs, including: Auto Collision Repair, Auto Technology, Culinary Arts, Commercial Baking, Design/Technology, Firefighting/EMT, Medical Science, Certified Nursing Assistant, Intro to Applied Technology, Machine Shop, Marine Technology, Small Engine Repair, Principles of Engineering, Digital Electronics, Residential Construction, and Welding/Fabrication. Additionally, MCST provides academic support in the areas of Mathematics, Social Studies and Analytical/Technical Writing and English.

Career and Technical High Schools in Maine have a variety of Early College opportunities for students. Many of the CTE programs have negotiated agreements with Maine colleges that allow students to receive college credit for documented achievement in high school programs. Most MCST programs have articulation agreements with local community colleges and universities such as Eastern Maine Community College, Southern Maine Community College, Central Maine Community College, York County Community College, and Washington County Community College. Some programs offer dual enrollment, in which students directly receive college credit while taking their CTE program.

== Extracurricular activities ==
Extracurricular activities include the following: SkillsUSA, National Technical Honors Society and Media Team.

=== SkillsUSA ===
SkillsUSA is a national nonprofit organization dedicated to ensuring and supporting America's skilled workforce. An annual competition is held at the local, state and national level in which students compete in their respective trade areas. During the 2010–2011 academic year, MCST students won 7 medals at the state competition held in Bangor, ME on March 11 & 12. Post-secondary firefighting student Mike Root won the gold medal and proceeded to the national competition in Kansas City.
