= Brunswick School Department =

School district in Brunswick, Maine, United States

Brunswick High School

The Brunswick School Department is the school district serving Brunswick, Maine, United States.

== History ==
In September 2013, due to the growing population of Harriet Beecher Stowe Elementary School, the district was deciding whether to reassign the fifth grade to Brunswick Junior High School or to add additional mobile classrooms to Coffin Elementary School.

In 2013, the district sent the assistant superintendent to Zhejiang, China for $5,000 for a goodwill trip. The purpose was to find exchange students to cover for population losses. As a result, Greg Bartlett, the assistant superintendent of schools, met with officials of Jinhua No. 1 High School, Brunswick High School's sister school, and signed an agreement with Hangzhou No. 14 High School, another sister school.

There was a formal commitment for the school board to arrange to have a new school built on the location of the closed Jordan Acres Elementary School, but the school district tabled the agreement in December 2013.

== Schools ==
The district's schools include:

- Brunswick High School
- Brunswick Junior High School
- Kate Furbish Elementary School
- Harriet Beecher Stowe Elementary School
- REAL School
- Region 10 Technical High School
