= Messalonskee =

Messalonskee may refer to:

- Messalonskee High School
- Messalonskee Lake
