= Matilda White Riley =

American gerontologist (1911–2004)

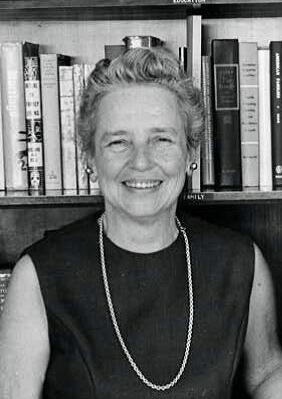
- Born: April 19, 1911; Boston, Massachusetts
- Died: November 14, 2004 (aged 93); Brunswick, Maine
- Education: Radcliffe College
- Known for: Implemented the extramural program in the behavioral and social sciences at the National Institutes of Health
- Scientific career
- Fields: Sociology; Gerontology
- Workplaces: National Institute on Aging

Matilda White Riley (April 19, 1911 – November 14, 2004) was an American gerontologist who began working at Rutgers University as a research specialist before becoming a professor from 1950 to 1973. Here she wrote a textbook and discovered her interest in aging. In 1973, Riley became the first woman full professor at Bowdoin College, where she worked until 1981. She spent much of her career as a sociologist specializing in aging at the National Institute on Aging, part of the National Institutes of Health. Additionally, Riley worked with the Russell Sage Foundation from 1974 to 1977 where she wrote works on the age-stratification paradigm and aging society perspective.

== Life and education ==
Matilda White Riley was born on April 19, 1911, in Boston, Massachusetts. She was raised by her grandmother in Brunswick, Maine. Riley attended Brunswick High School; there she met her husband John (Jack) W. Riley Jr. In 1931, she earned her bachelor's (and later her master's degree) from Radcliffe College in Cambridge, Massachusetts. Later that same year, she and John married. They were married for sixty-nine years until John's death in 2002. Together, the couple had two children, John W. Riley III and Lucy Sallick. Riley and her husband often worked side by side, recurrently co-authoring papers together. Their first joint scientific paper was published in the 1930s and concerned contraceptive behavior. Riley worked as a research assistant at Harvard from 1932 to 1933 while John was a graduate student. From 1942 to 1944, Riley worked as a market researcher and an economist for the War Production Board during World War II. Along with her father, Riley established the Market Research Company of America from 1939 to 1949. Later she began a career in the Sociology of Aging at Rutgers University in New Jersey and then at Bowdoin College in Brunswick, Maine. In 1972, Riley earned her Doctor of Science degree from Bowdoin College and then in 1973 earned her Doctor in Humane Letters from Rutgers University.

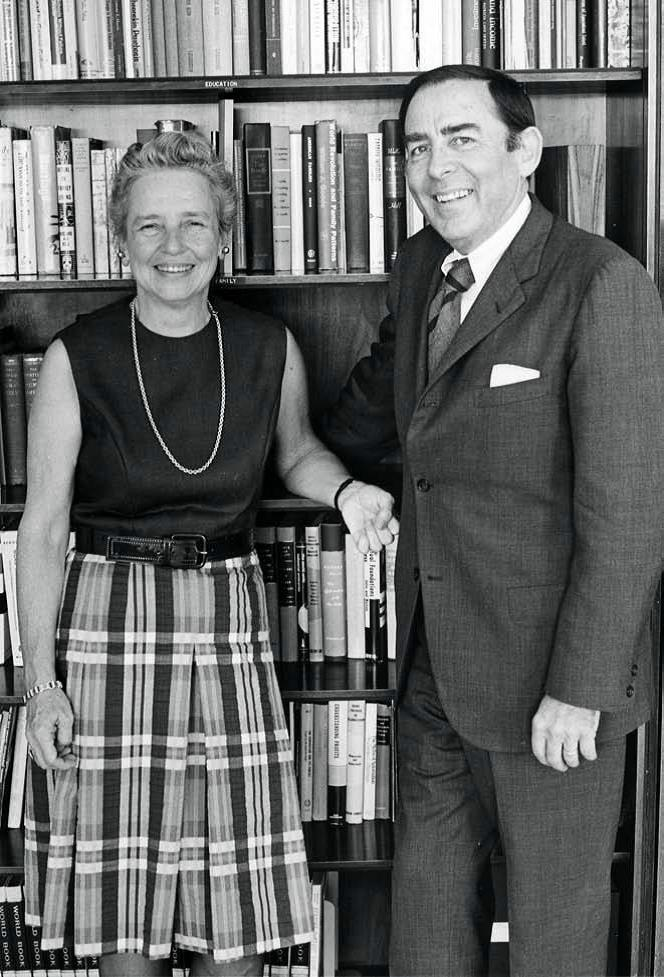
Matilda White Riley and husband, John Riley, Bowdoin College, 1972

== Career highlights and accomplishments ==
Matilda White Riley was in charge of Social Science Research in the National Institute of Aging of the National Institutes of Health. She was one of the main chairpersons for the NIA, who was mostly in charge of the health and behavior. She was also the co-chair of the joint Alcohol, Drug Abuse, and Mental Health Administration (ADAMHA, now SAMSHA)and NIH Steering Committee for the Institute of Medicine's Project on Health and Behavior (1979–1982). She served as a spokesperson for the National Institute of Health (NIH) for behavioral and social science research, coordinating research programs and giving presentations for the institute. She is credited with founding the Behavioral and Social Research Program at the National Institute on Aging. She and her husband were co-presidents of the District of Columbia Sociological Society. From 1949 to 1960 she served as the Executive Officer of the American Sociological Association (ASA), and later became the 77th President of the Association. Matilda White Riley had a total of 16 books that she wrote by herself or edited with other authors. Riley continued her work through her later years, she began focusing on age segregation and solutions to attain age integration. In 2016, the Office of Behavioral and Social Sciences at the National Institutes of Health announced the Matilda White Riley Early Stage Investigator Honors program.

== Awards, honors, and distinctions ==
- Executive director of American Sociological Association (1949–1960)
- President of the Eastern Sociological Society (1976)
- Member of the Institute of Medicine (1979)
- Associate director for behavioral and social research at the National Institute of Aging (1979–1991)
- 77th president of the American Sociological Association (1985–1986)
- Fellow of the American Academy of Arts and Sciences (1987)
- Distinguished Scholar Award (1988)
- ASA Section on Aging (1989)
- Gerontological Society of America Distinguished Creative Contribution to Gerontology (1990)
- Member of the National Academy of Sciences (1994)
- Social scientist emeritus at the NIH (1998)
- Academy of Behavioral Medicine Research

== Dedications ==
On May 8, 1996, the Matilda White Riley House was dedicated in her honor as part of the Department of Sociology and Anthropology at Bowdoin College. In 2016, the Office of Behavioral and Social Sciences at the National Institutes of Health announced the Matilda White Riley Early Stage Investigator Honors program.

== See also ==
- Gerontology
- National Institute of Aging
- Bowdoin College
