= Maine School Administrative District 75 =

School district in Maine, USA

Address
- 50 Republic Avenue Topsham, Maine, 04086; United States
- Coordinates: 43°55′N 70°0′W

District information
- Type: Public
- Grades: PreK–12
- NCES District ID: 2314768

Students and staff
- Students: 2,408 (2020–2021)
- Teachers: 209.0 (on an FTE basis)
- Staff: 252.5 (on an FTE basis)
- Student–teacher ratio: 11.52:1

Other information
- Website: www.link75.org

Maine School Administrative District 75 operates five elementary schools (K–5), one middle school (6–8) and one high school (9–12) in Cumberland and Sagadahoc Counties in the U.S. state of Maine.

== Schools ==
Name	Website	Principal	Description
Mt. Ararat High School	website	Chris Hoffman	Provides public education to students in grades 9 through 12 in the towns of Bowdoin, Bowdoinham, Harpswell, and Topsham. Their school colors are royal blue, white, and red. Their mascot is the eagle.
Mt. Ararat Middle School	website	Megan Hayes Teague	Provides public education to students in grades 6 through 8 in the towns of Bowdoin, Bowdoinham, Harpswell, and Topsham. Attached to the school is the Orion Performing Arts Center which is frequently used by the community. Their school colors are royal blue, white and scarlet. Their mascot is the eagle.
Bowdoin Central School	website	Ryan Keith	Provides public education to students in grades K through 5 from the town of Bowdoin, Maine.
Bowdoinham Community School	website	Chris Lajoie	Provides public education to students in grades K through 5 from the town of Bowdoinham, Maine.
Harpswell Community School	website	Anita Hopkins	Provides public education to students in grades K through 5 from the town of Harpswell, Maine.
Williams-Cone Elementary School	website	Brem Stoner	Provides public education to students in grades K through 5 in the town of Topsham, Maine.
Woodside Elementary School	website	Richard W. Dedek II	Provides public education to students in grades K through 5 in the town of Topsham, Maine.
