= RSU 1 =

School district in Maine, United States

Regional School Unit 1

Address
- 34 Wing Farm Parkway Bath, Sagadahoc County, Maine; United States

District information
- Grades: PreK–12
- Schools: 7
- NCES District ID: 2314772

Students and staff
- Students: 1,808
- Teachers: 172.51 FTE
- Student–teacher ratio: 10.48:1

Other information
- Website: www.rsu1.org

The Regional School Unit 1 (RSU 1) in Bath, Maine, includes seven public schools that were part of the Bath School Department:

- Dike-Newell School (grades K-2), Fisher-Mitchell School (grades 3–5),
- Phippsburg Elementary (grades Pre-K-5),
- Woolwich Central School (Grades Pre-K-8),
- West Bath School (grades Kindergarten-5),
- Bath Middle School (grades 6–8),
- Morse High School (grades 9–12),
- Bath Regional Career and Technical Center.

In 2016, the Bath School Department was consolidated with other area schools (West Bath, Phippsburg and Woolwich) to form RSU 1 .
