= Freeport High School (Maine) =

Public school in the United States

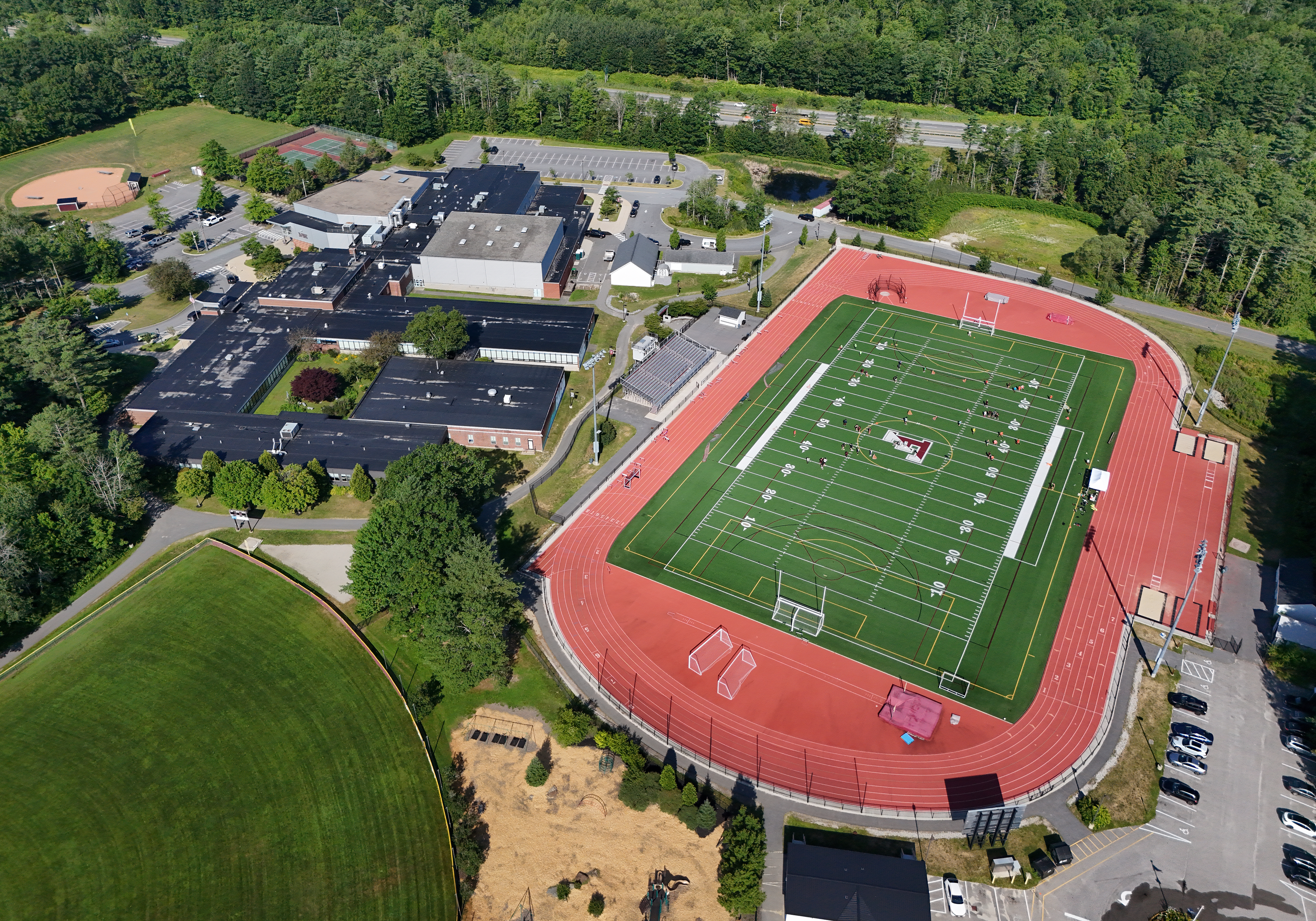
- Aerial view from 2025

Location
- 30 Holbrook Street; Freeport, Maine 04032; United States; 43°51′27″N 70°06′34″W

Information
- Type: Public
- Established: 1961
- School district: Regional School Unit No. 5
- Principal: Timothy Grivois
- Teaching staff: 48.60 (FTE)
- Grades: 9–12
- Enrollment: 593 (2024-2025)
- Student to teacher ratio: 12.20
- Colors: Maroon, Black and White
- Mascot: Freeport Falcons
- Website: fhs.rsu5.org

Freeport High School is a public high school in Freeport, Maine, United States for students in grades 9–12 residing in the towns of Freeport, Durham, and Pownal. Freeport High School is one of four schools in the Freeport School District; the others being Mast Landing School, Morse Street School, and Freeport Middle School.

== Student population ==
The student population at Freeport High School for the 2024-2025 school year was approximately 600 students.

=== Notable alumni ===
- Stephen Gill Spottswood - Bishop of the African Methodist Episcopal Zion Church, Chairman of the NAACP
- Drew Taggart - Member of The Chainsmokers

== Academics ==
=== SAT results ===
As with other districts in the Greater Portland area, the SAT scores of Freeport High School were significantly higher than the state average, coming in 10th in the state for Math and Reading, and 11th in Writing in 2007.

In the Mathematics section, Freeport students had an average score of 485, tying with York High School. In the Reading section, Freeport students had an average score of 492, tying with Scarborough High School. Finally, in the writing section, Freeport students received an average score of 483.

In the 2012–2013 school year, Maine Department of Education reports showed that 50% of students were meeting the standards on the mathematics section of the test, higher than the state average of 48.1 percent. In the reading section, 59.6 percent of students were reading at or above their grade level, higher than the state average of 48.9 percent. While the state average on the SAT writing section had dropped more than three percent from the previous school year, 48.5 percent of Freeport students met the grade-level standard on the writing section, nearly five points higher than the state average.

In 2017, the average SAT score was 1006, higher than the state average of 994. This included a 507 in the reading section and a 499 in the mathematics section.

=== Graduation rates ===
Between the 2010–2011 and 2013–2014 school years, Regional School Unit 5 (of which Freeport High School is the main secondary school) reported graduation rates of 92%.

Year	Graduation Rate
2019	93.2
2018	96.3
2017	90.3
2016	94.3
2015	98.4
2014	92.5
2013	92.1
2012	92.68
2011	92.31
2010	93.41
2009	84.62

=== One-act plays ===
Freeport High School is one of only two schools in the state that consistently enters student written one-act plays into the Maine Principals' Association's annual drama festival, the other being Morse High School.
