= Biddeford Regional Center of Technology =

Vocational School in Biddeford, Maine, United States

Coordinates: 43.4960°N 70.4708°W

Location
- 10 Maplewood Ave; Biddeford, York County, Maine 04005

Information
- School type: Vocational School
- Director: Paulette Bonneau
- Website: https://www.biddefordschools.me/o/brct

Biddeford Regional Center of Technology (BRCOT) is a vocational school located in Biddeford, Maine, United States. It is a secondary vocational school located on the Biddeford High School campus for students enrolled at Biddeford High School, Kennebunk High School, Old Orchard Beach High School and Thornton Academy.

== History ==
The Biddeford Regional Center of Technology was established in 1969 with the goal that students who enroll acquire academic, career and industry-recognized technical skills that will prepare them for entry into the workforce and post-secondary education, which has led to several community projects led and completed by Biddeford Regional Center of Technology students, including creating the 2018 emblem for the Coast Guard Academy. Biddeford Regional Center of Technology has also partnered with York County Community College (YCCC) and Southern Maine Community College (SMCC) to provide college credit and certifications for their programs.
