= Erskine Academy =

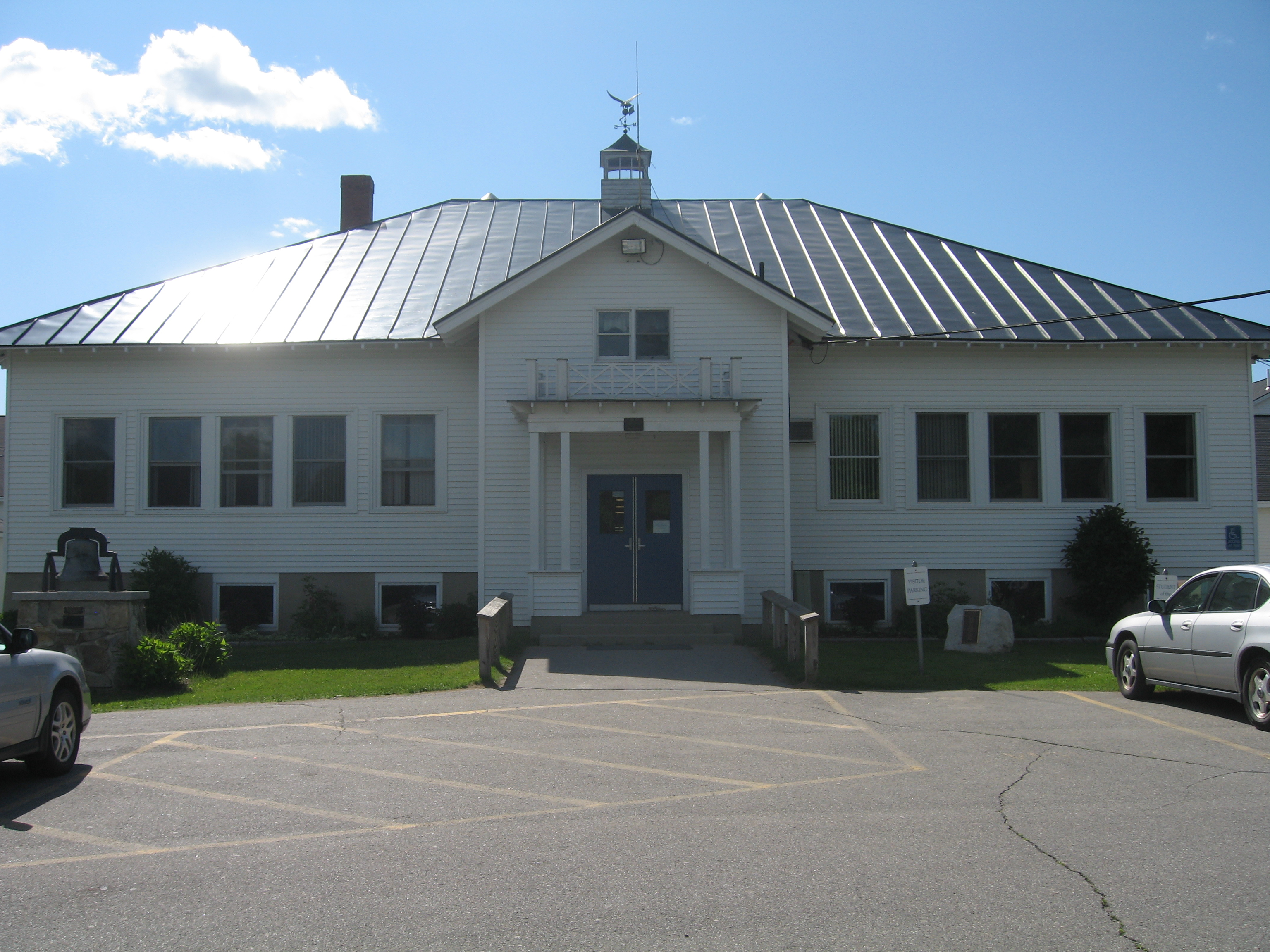

Location
- 309 Windsor Road; South China, Kennebec, Maine 04358; United States; 44.373587°N 69.57522°W

Information
- Motto: Mens Sana in Corpore Sano (A Healthy Mind In A Healthy Body)
- Founded: 1883
- Founder: Estate of Solomon Erskine
- CEEB code: 200945
- Headmaster: Jamie Soule
- Staff: 82
- Enrollment: 552
- Colors: Blue and White
- Mascot: Eagle
- Website: www.erskineacademy.org

Erskine Academy is a private high school located in South China, Maine that serves eight surrounding towns. The campus occupies about 25 acres (100,000 m^{2}) of land and includes several academic buildings as well as various athletic fields. The school's motto is "Mens Sana in Corpore Sano" (A Healthy Mind In A Healthy Body). Erskine Academy's school colors are blue and white, and an eagle is the school's mascot.

== History ==
Erskine was founded as a result of a trust established following the passing of Sullivan Erskine in 1880. John K. Erskine, a nephew of Sullivan, asked Mary Erskine to bequest a portion of the money to the town of China to be placed in some reliable trust, the annual interest to be used to support and control a high school for the town. This school was to be located in school district No. 14.

In this, John Erskine saw a chance by which his dream of a life-time might be realized. In his own youth he had been denied the privilege of a high school education, and he made up his mind that if opportunity ever came his way he would see that the younger generation had this chance.

A body of trustees was established and they went to Augusta, and proceeded to enlist the services of attorneys, Samuel Titcomb, W.S. Choate and Mr. Boardman, editor of the Maine Farmer. These in consultation, drew up a deed of trust that established the school. This being done, the trustees met and organized, choosing Eli Jones, president; J.K. Erskine, vice-president; Dana C. Hanson, secretary, and Samuel C. Starrett, treasurer. The school then secured a building from an old Methodist Church and opened in 1883. Tuition at Erskne Academy is $12,650 a year for non boarding students and $13,650 boarding.

== Faculty ==
Headmaster: Jamie Soule

== Towns ==
Erskine Academy serves the following towns: Chelsea, China, Jefferson, Palermo, Somerville, Vassalboro, Whitefield, Windsor.

== Academic departments ==
- Music Department - The music department consists of one instructor, Jim Johnson. He is aided by his wife, Bridget Convey. She accompanies the Chorus. There are 4 performing Ensembles: Concert Band, Jazz Combo (Audition Required), Percussion Explosion (Teacher Permission Required), and Chorus. There is 1 class: Music Lab.
- Theatre Department - The drama department consists of two classes taught by Ryan Nored. The classes are Introduction to Drama and Advanced Drama. Advanced Drama students must have taken Introduction to Drama or have been a member of the EA Theatre Club.
- English Department - The English Department is a busy department because students need to take four English classes in order to graduate. A.P. Literature and Composition and A.P. Language and Composition are offered.
- Math Department - Students need to take three math classes to graduate. A.P. Calculus and A.P. Statistics are offered.
- Science Department - Students need to take three science classes to graduate. A.P. Biology, AP Chemistry, and AP Physics are sometimes offered.
- Language Department - Students need to take two language classes to graduate. EA offers Spanish, French, Chinese, Russian, German, Latin, and in the past has offered Italian after school. A.P. Spanish is sometimes offered.
- History Department - Students need to take three history classes to graduate. A.P. U.S. History is offered.

== Athletics ==
Erskine Academy offers several sports, and is a member of the Kennebec Valley Athletic Conference.

Fall Season

- Soccer (Varsity Boys, JV Boys, Freshman Boys, Varsity Girls, and JV Girls teams)
- Cross Country (Boys and Girls teams)
- Field Hockey (Varsity Girls and JV Girls teams)
- Golf (One main team open to boys and girls)
- Football (Varsity Boys, JV Boys, and Freshman Boys teams)

Winter Season

- Basketball (Varsity Boys, JV Boys, Varsity Girls, and JV Girls teams)
- Wrestling (One main team open to boys and girls)
- Cheering (Varsity and JV teams open to boys and girls)
- Indoor Track (Girls and Boys teams- a non-cut sport)
- Swimming (Girls and Boys teams- a non-cut sport)

Spring Season

- Baseball (Varsity and JV teams)
- Lacrosse (Varsity and JV teams)
- Softball (Varsity and JV teams)
- Track and Field (Girls and Boys teams- a non-cut sport)
- Tennis (Varsity Boys and Varsity Girls teams)

== See also ==
- Education in Maine
