= Hangzhou No. 14 High School =

Provincial high school in Zhejiang

Hangzhou No.14 High School
- Type: Provincial Level Key High School, Public
- Established: 1904
- Location: Hangzhou, Zhejiang, China
- Principal: Feng Qiu
- Former Name: Hangzhou Girls' High School
- Average Class Size: 50 (non-AP) / 15 (AP)
- Campus (Fengqi): Urban, about 50,000 square metres (12 acres)
- website: www.h14z.com

Hangzhou No.14 High School is a provincial level key high school located at 580 Fengqi Road, Hangzhou, Zhejiang. The school is located at the center of the city in front of Mituo Mountain and near West Lake.

== Honors ==
No.14 second's students are top students of Hangzhou. In 2003, Meng Linyan (孟琳燕) won the gold medal of the International Biology Olympic Olympic competition which was held in Belarus. In 2004 student Lou Tianchen (楼天城) won the gold medal of the 16th middle school students of international information Athens Olympic competition. Along with its accomplishments this school has held diverse activities, including solemn Zhejiang Students Art Festival in October 2013, which this school has won the first prize on chorus with "Snowflake" and Chamber Orchestra with "Folk Dance of Romania". In 2013, the grade of Zhongkao of No.14 high school is 500, it is the fourth in Hangzhou.

== AP center ==
AP center was set in 2012, as the first AP center in Hangzhou. There are 124 students enrolled, including 60 students in grade 10, 60 students in grade 11 and 4 students in grade 12. Up to now, More than 10 AP courses are provided. AP center also have various activities such as Yoga, Kiva, play chess, card game, kickball, Spanish, French, debate, etc. to enrich student's daily life and enable them to study beyond course content. During western festivals such as Christmas, Halloween and Thanksgiving Day, AP center hold parties to celebrate, familiarizing students with western culture. From December 12–16, 2013, Japanese students and teachers visited No.14 AP center.

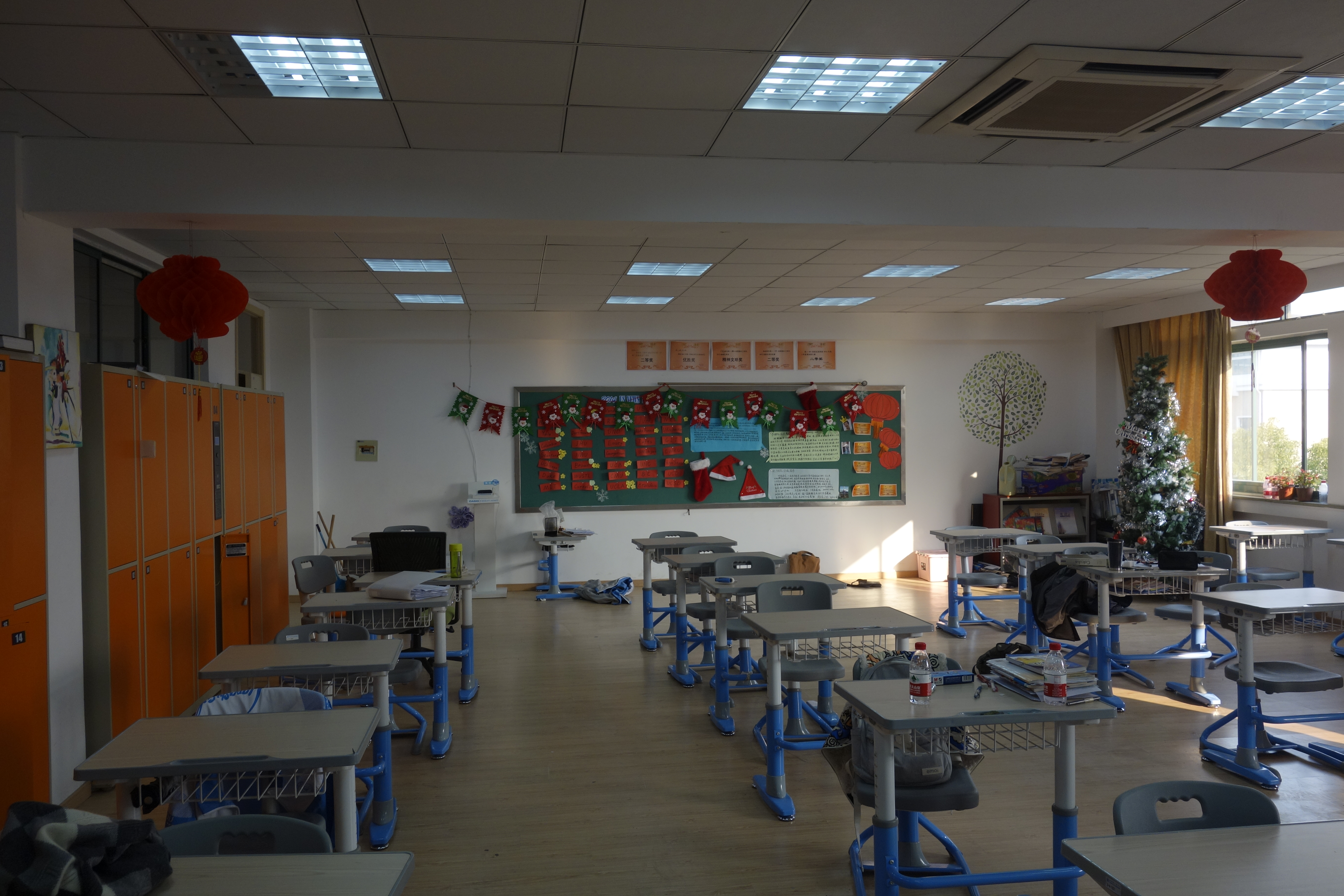
Classroom of AP center

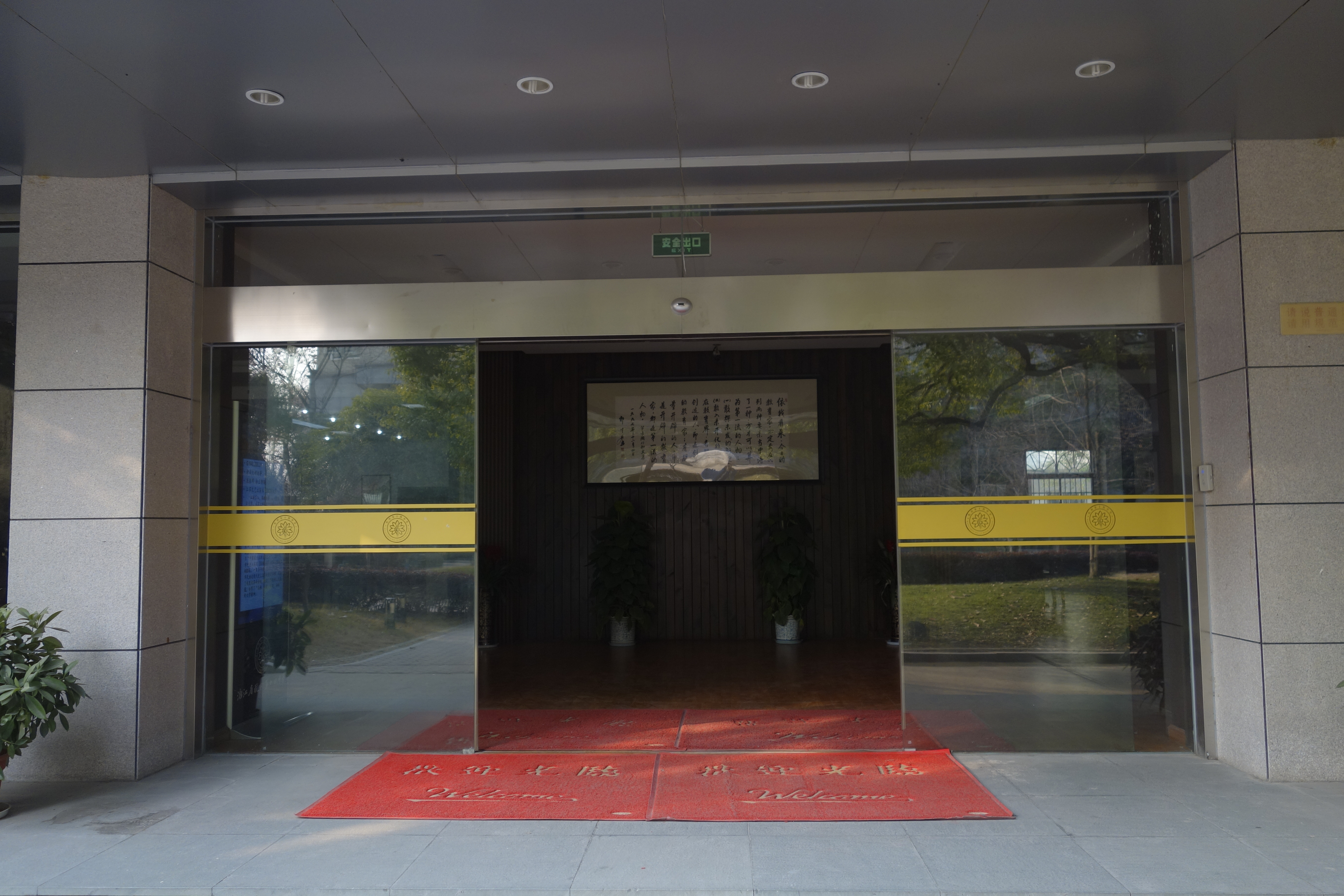
Gate of AP center

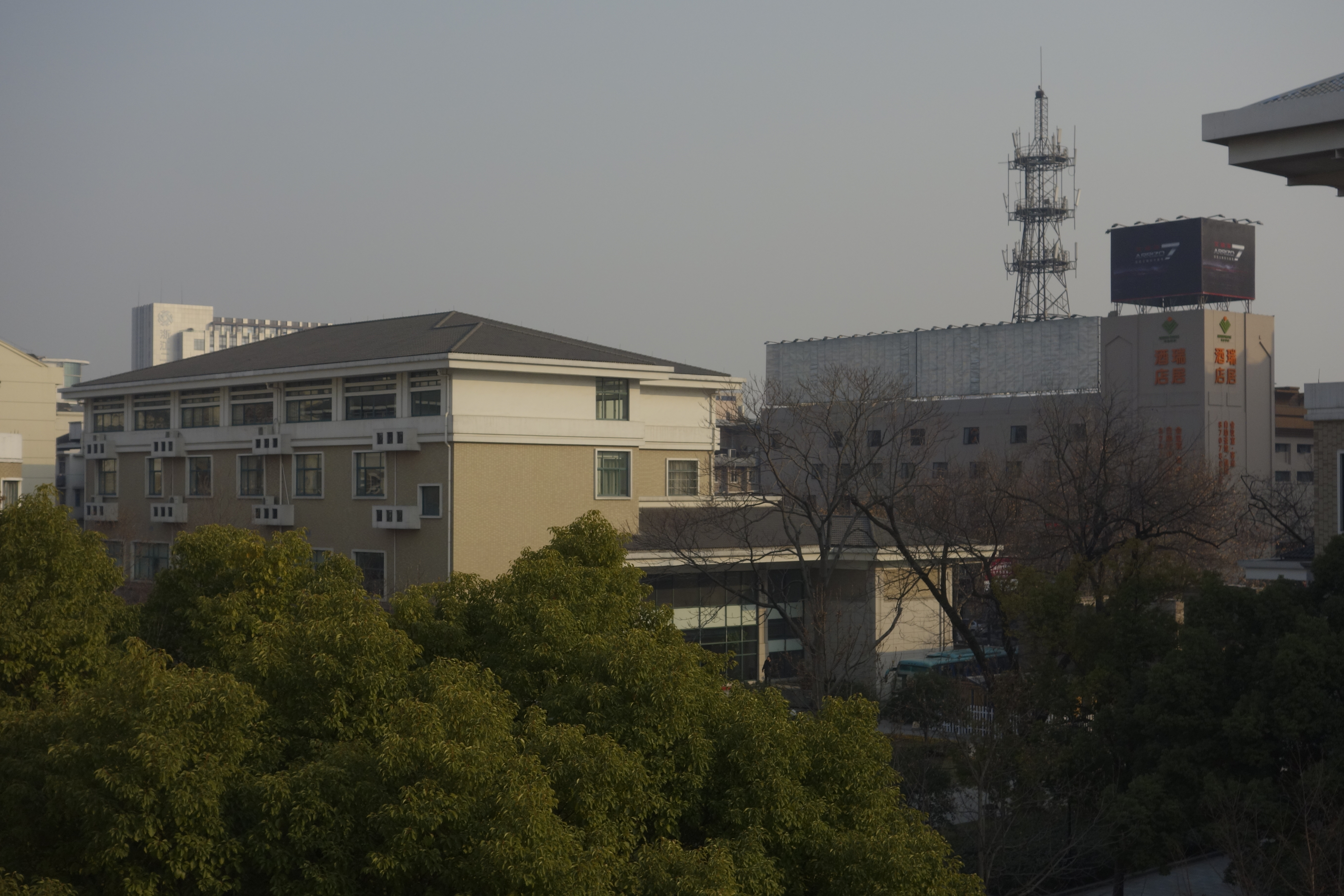
Part of school

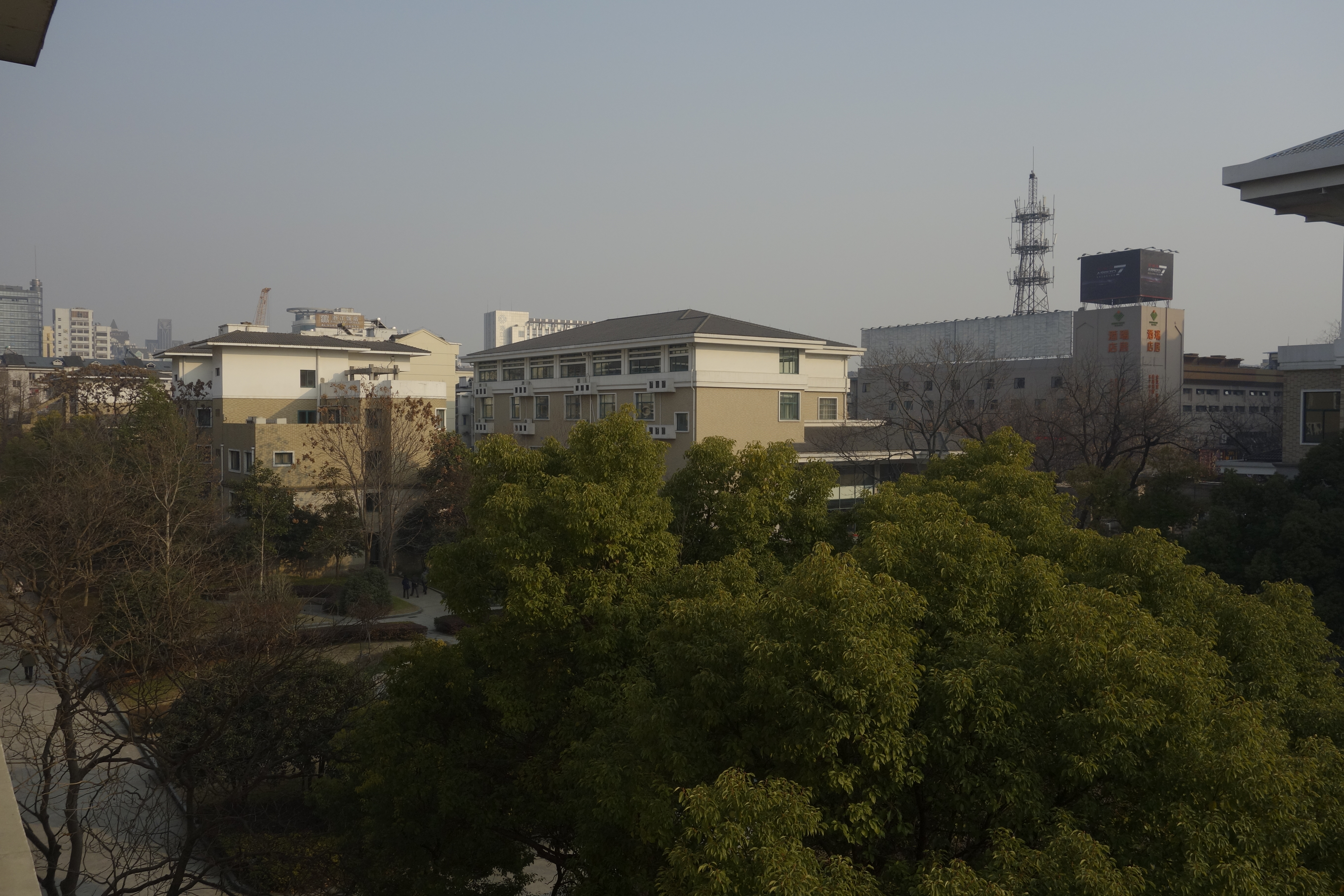
Part of the school

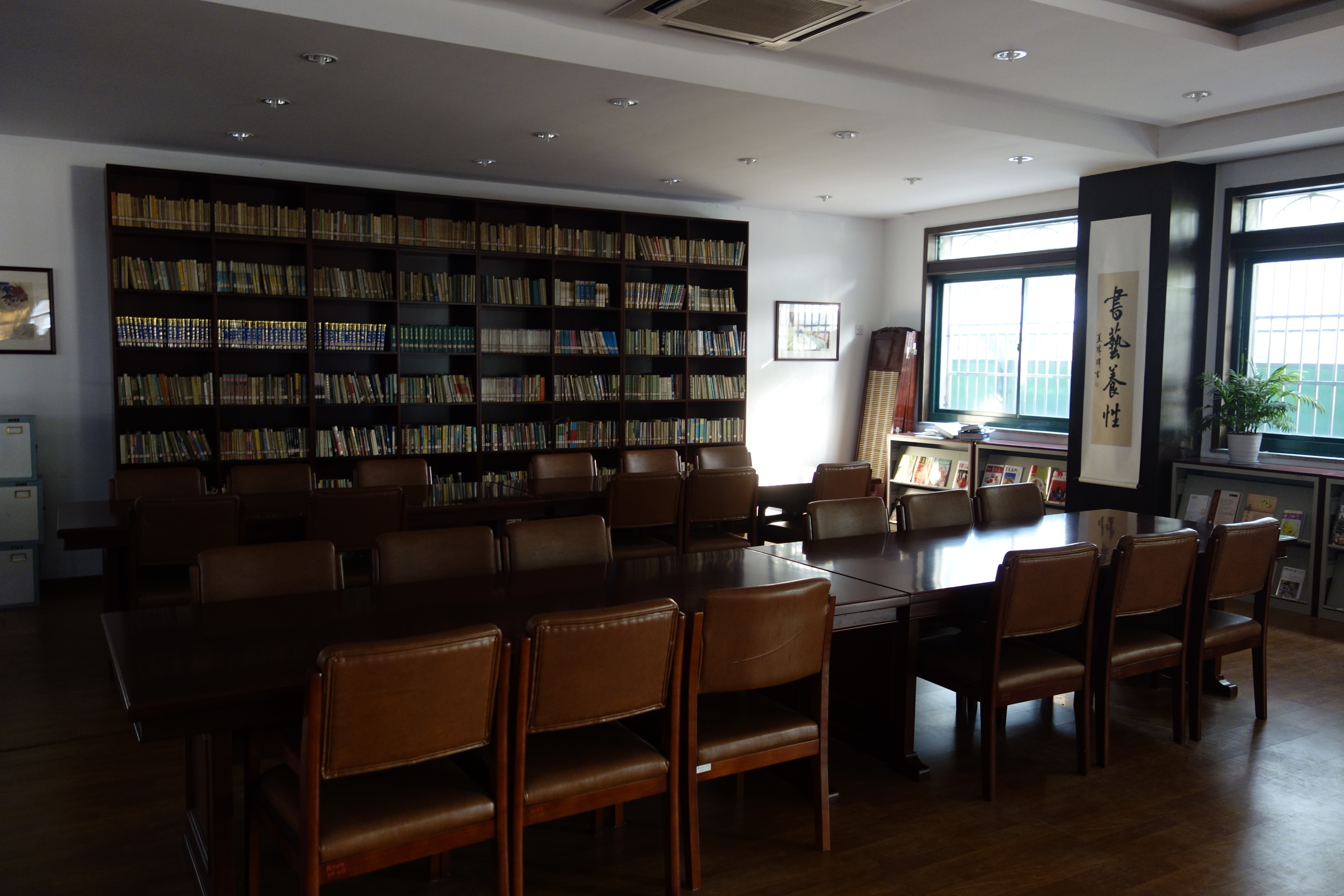
Study hall (2)

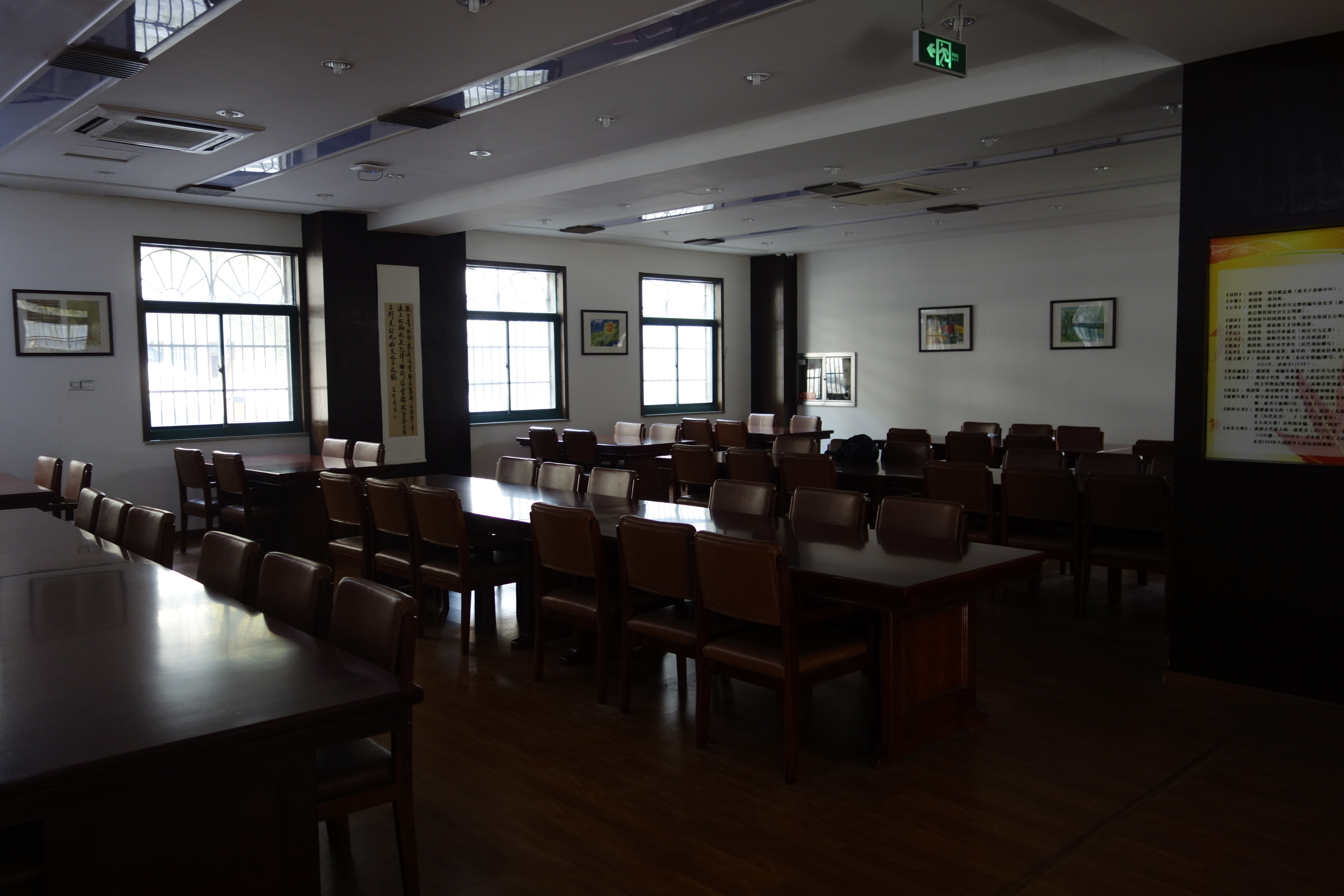
Study hall

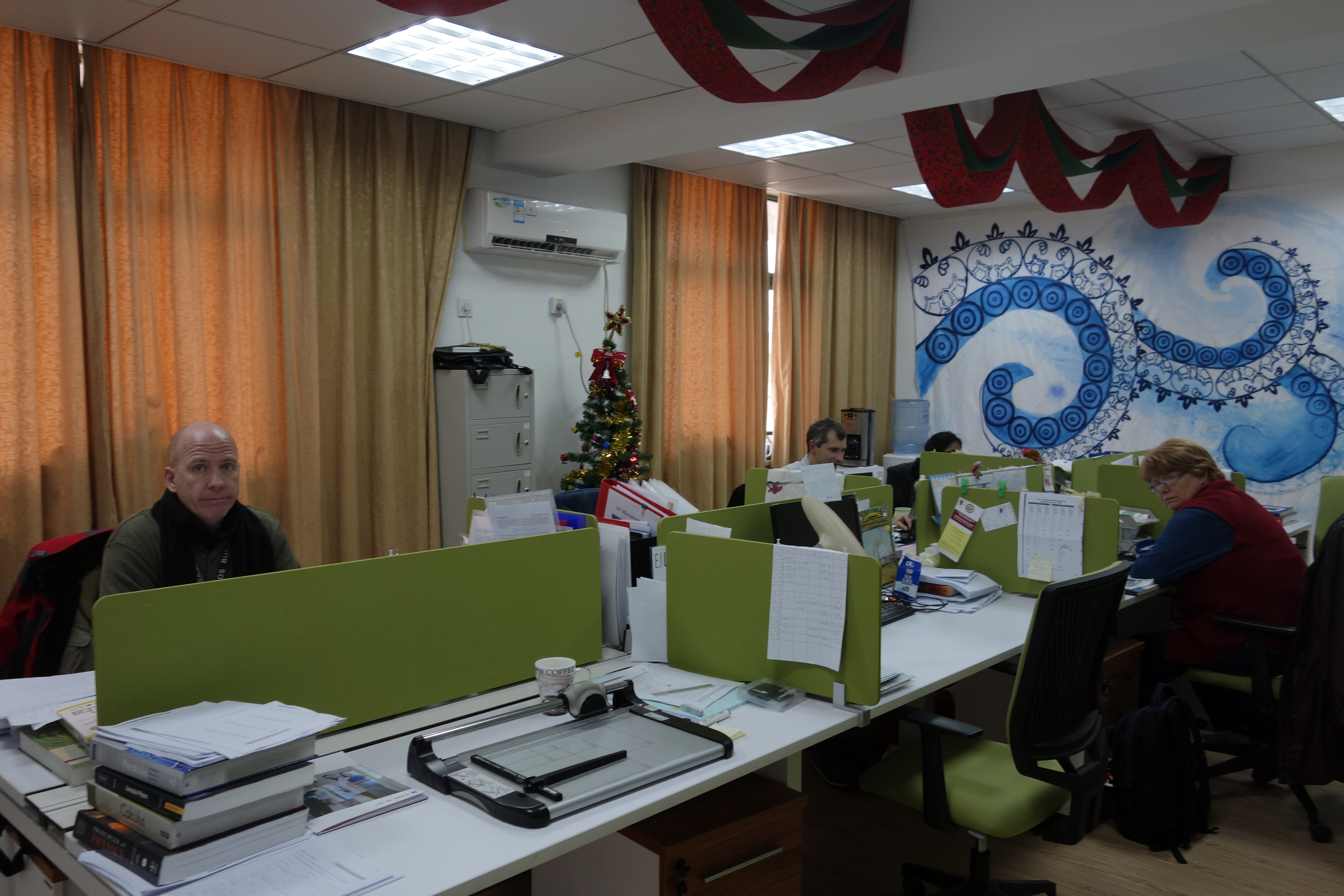
Teachers' office

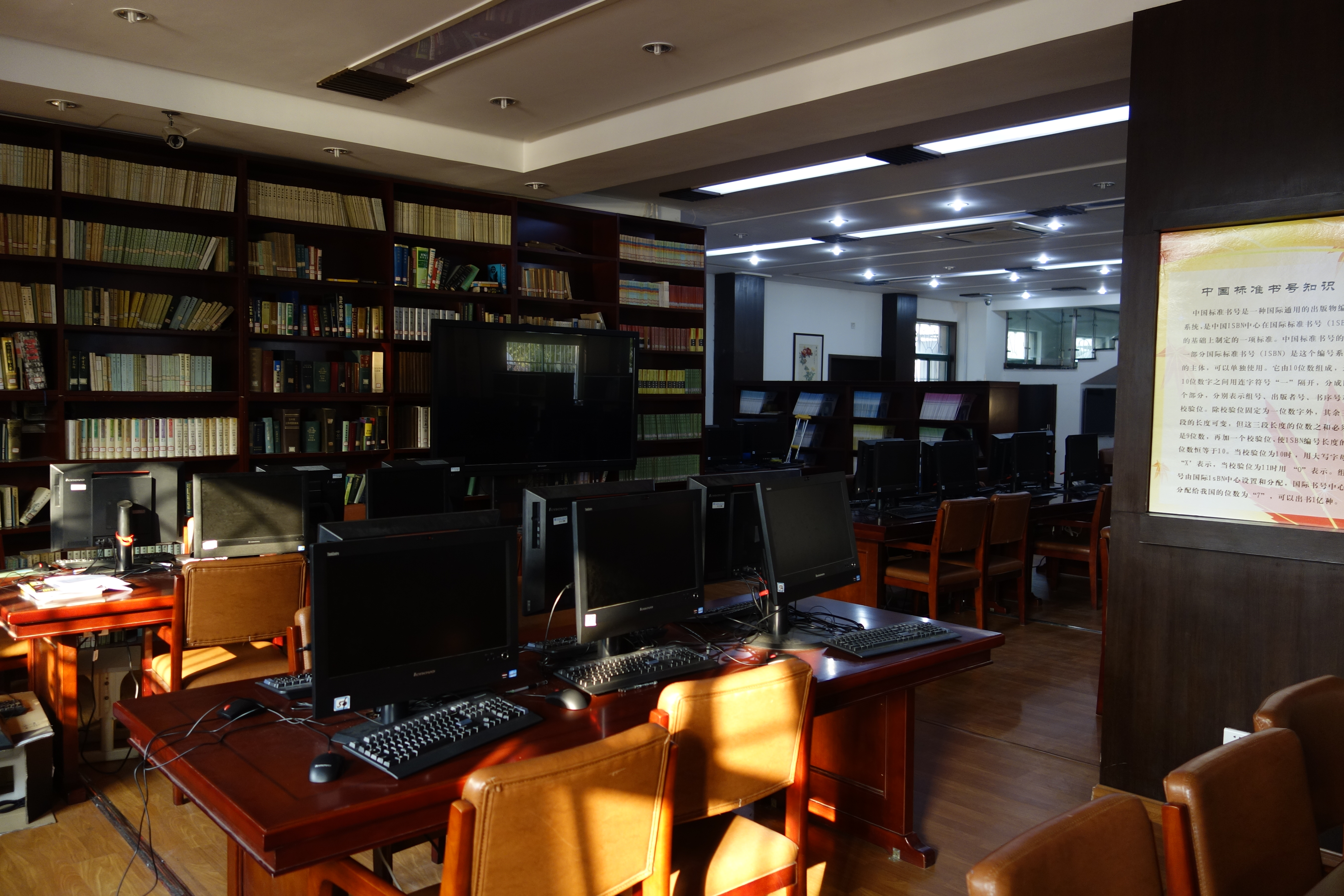
Computer lab

=== Curriculum ===
In AP Center in Hangzhou No.14 High School

=== Students ===
The class size is currently 30. Each grade has 2 classes, 60 students in total. The earliest group of 4 students were transferred from non-AP classes in 2012.

Year	Applicants	Enrolled
2012	Not Applicable	7*
2013	over 200	60
2014	over 650	60
2015	over 300	60
2016	over 300	60
2017	over 300	60

- The class of 2012 was experimental and was not open to applicants outside of school.
