= Mt. Abram Regional High School =

Location
- 1513 Salem Road; Salem, Maine 04983; United States
- Coordinates: 44.9036°N 70.2704°W

Information
- Motto: Fear The Mountain
- Established: November 1969
- School district: Maine School Administrative District 58
- Grades: 9-12
- Enrollment: 216 (2024-2025)
- Colors: Royal blue and gold
- Team name: Roadrunners
- Website: mtabram.msad58.org

Mt. Abram Regional High School (Mt. Abram) is a public school located in Salem Township, Maine, United States. It is a part of Maine School Administrative District 58, and is the only high school in the District.

== History ==
During the early 1940s a study investigated unifying the high schools of the area. Consultants were brought in to address the feasibility of the issue. In 1966 the local towns voted to form a school administrative district.

On July 22, 1966, the Articles of Organization was issued by the State Department of Education, and on August 8, Maine School Administrative District No.58 became operative. On the same day, the Board met and elected Carroll Edgerly of Kingfield, Maine, as Chairman, and David Spaulding of Eustis, Maine, as Vice-Chairman. On September 9, 1968, the contract was given to Fred F. Merrill in order to construct the Mount Abram high school. The building was fully prepared in the first week of November 1969.

Elected by each school's student body, a committee of members from each school was elected to select a name and a school emblem for Mt. Abram. Suggestions were given by each school to this committee. Several names and emblems were selected from the list; the selected names were put on a ballot for the students to select the emblem. The balloting process led to the choice of the school's mascot and name as the Looney Tunes Road Runner.

== Budget ==
Mt. Abram's deficit has increased since 2010, with the approximate debt of the district being $6,000,000.

Several attempts to lower the deficit have taken place; however, most have failed. A protest took place on May 19, 2015 to protest the current budget situation. A $14 operating budget was proposed for the 2015–16 school year.

Despite the previously mentioned attempts to lower the budget, an increased total of approximately $9.7 million was proposed in tandem with the hiring of a new school superintendent and increased faculty. An actual budget of $9.4 million was approved by voters in June of that year.
