= Brunswick High School (Maine) =

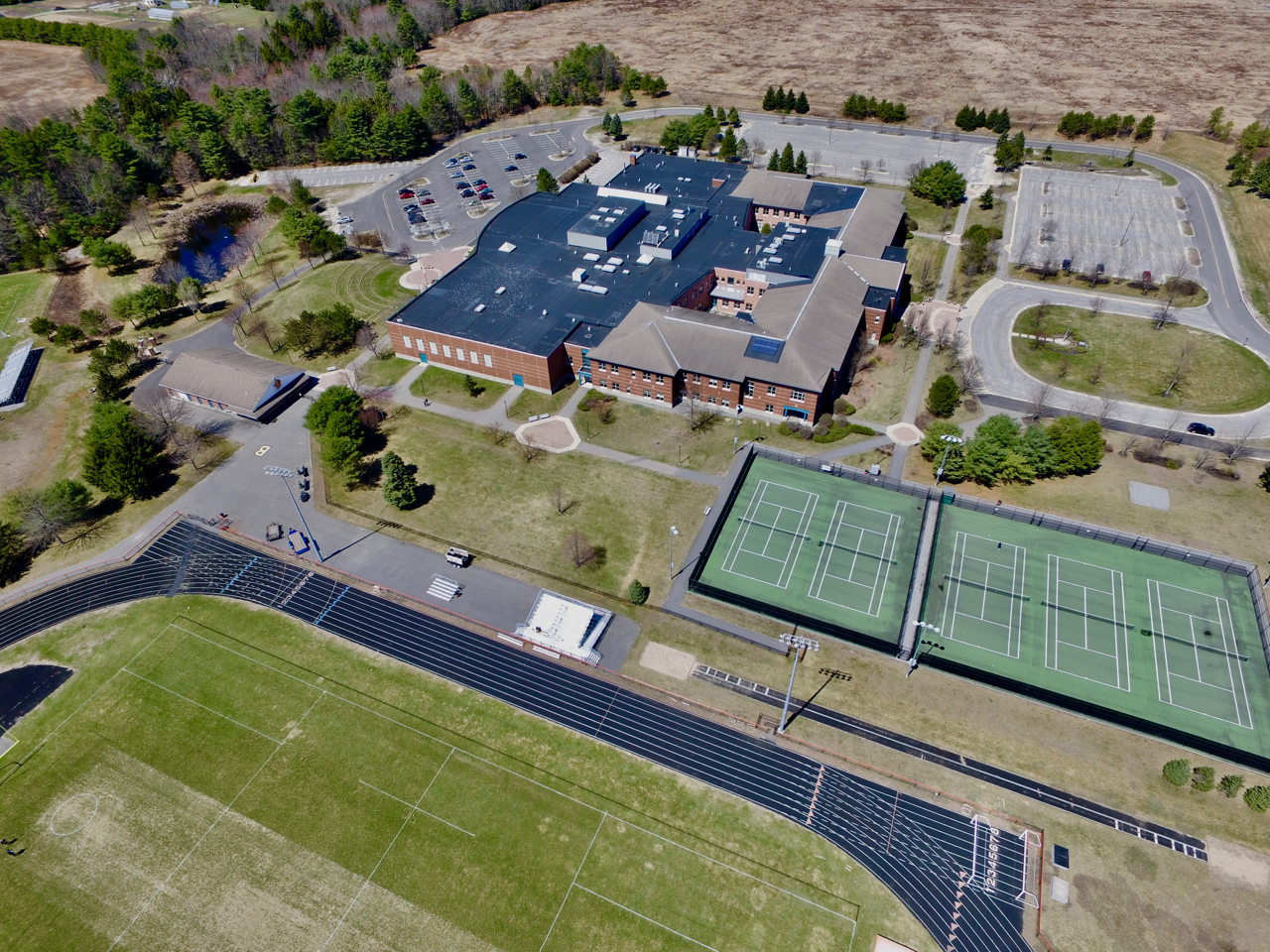
- Aerial view in 2017

Location
- 71 Dragon Drive; Brunswick, Cumberland County, Maine 04011; United States; 43°53′00″N 69°59′14″W

Information
- School type: Public
- Founded: 1851
- School district: Brunswick School Department
- Superintendent: Phil Potenziano
- Principal: Troy Henninger
- Staff: 130
- Teaching staff: 66.50 (FTE)
- Grades: 9-12
- Enrollment: 715 (2023-2024)
- Student to teacher ratio: 10.75
- Language: English
- Colors: Black and orange
- Athletics conference: Kennebec Valley Athletic Conference
- Mascot: Dragon
- Nickname: Dragons
- Yearbook: Dragon Spirit
- Website: www.brunswicksd.org/o/bhs

Brunswick High School is a public high school in Brunswick, Maine, United States. It is a part of the Brunswick School Department.

Brunswick High School has a notable rivalry across the Androscoggin with the Eagles of Mt. Ararat High School.

== History ==
Although a private school operated under the same name in the 1840s, Brunswick High School was founded as a public school in 1851 as a part of a school consolidation and restructuring effort. It has had three different sites in Brunswick, Maine. The first was within a larger school building at the corner of Federal and Green Streets (now 46 Federal Street). Hawthorne Elementary School was at 46 Federal Street until it closed in 2009. Its most recent use is as the Brunswick School Department's central office.

In 1938, a new building was planned by architect Harry S. Coombs and constructed with Works Progress Administration funds on the corner of Spring and McKeen Streets, west of downtown Brunswick. In 1951, a one-story wing of classrooms was constructed off the southern portion of the western side of the original structure. A second floor of classrooms was added to this wing in 1961, along with a new two-floor wing off the northern portion of the original building's western side. The new north wing mirrored the 1951 addition and created a courtyard. The two floors of the north wing provided more classrooms, a new gym, a cafeteria, a wood shop, science labs, and Home Economic rooms. By the 1990s the school was using temporary trailers as classrooms to deal with overcrowding and failed a state inspection. These and other factors contributed to a push to build a new school. The 1937 building and its additions later served temporarily as the location of Mount Ararat Middle School for the neighboring school district (School Administrative District #75) and were demolished in order to construct a new elementary school, Harriet Beecher Stowe School, which opened in 2011.

School front

The current Brunswick High School building opened in 1995 at 116 Maquoit Road (now 71 Dragon Drive), south of downtown Brunswick. In addition to providing expanded student capacity, the school has a television in every classroom and a video announcement system. Crooker Theater, which includes an orchestra pit, hosts the school's performing arts programs. Brunswick High School has been accredited by the state of Maine and the New England Association of Schools and Colleges.

Classes are 85 minutes each with five-minute breaks in between.

== Athletics ==
Brunswick High School, a member of the Kennebec Valley Athletic Conference, has won several state championships in both Class A and Class B (Football) competition.

- Boys' Basketball – 2002
- Cheerleading – 1990
- Girls' Cross Country – 2005–2007, 2023
- Football – 1961, 2016
- Boys' Lacrosse – 2007, 2015, 2017, 2018,2022
- Girls' Lacrosse – 2008–2009
- Boys' Soccer – 1984–1986, 1990–1991, 1999, 2023
- Girls' Soccer – 2004, 2009
- Boys' Swimming – 1961, 1965–1967
- Girls' Swimming – 2000–2001, 2015–2016
- Boys' Tennis – 1955/1956, 1962, 1996–1997, 1999
- Girls' Tennis – 1997–1998, 2012–2013,2023
- Boys' Track (Indoor) – 1975(tie), 1991, 2008, 2010,2023
- Boys' Track (Outdoor) – 1959 (Class L), 1969 (Class LL), 1996, 2010,2023
- Girls' Track (Outdoor) – 1985

== Notable alumni ==
- Mattie Daughtry, politician
- Mike Dumont, Navy vice admiral
- Will Geoghegan, long-distance runner
- Bret Gilliam, technical diver and author
- Michael Lemelin, politician
- Joanne P. McCallie, college basketball coach and advocate for mental health
- Stump Merrill, former Major League Baseball manager
- Ralph Mims, professional basketball player
- Matilda White Riley, gerontologist
- Aly Spaltro (Lady Lamb), musician
- Grant Tremblay, astrophysicist

=== Notable staff ===
- Edwin Hall, physicist and former principal

== Sources ==
- Wheeler, George Augustus. History of Brunswick, Topsham, and Harpswell, Maine: Including the Ancient Territory Known as Pejepscot. Brunswick, Maine: A. Mudge & Sons, 1878.
