= Messalonskee High School =

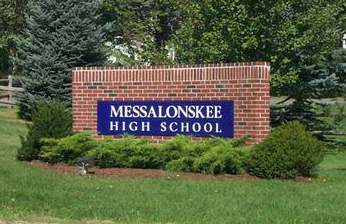

Location
- 131 Messalonskee High Drive; Oakland, Maine 04963; United States
- Coordinates: 44°33′24″N 69°43′01″W

Information
- School type: Public
- Established: 1969
- School district: RSU 18
- Superintendent: Andrew Carlton
- Principal: Scott Hallett
- Faculty: 82
- Grades: 9–12
- Student to teacher ratio: 13:1
- Language: English
- Campus type: Rural
- Colors: Red, White, Blue
- Mascot: Eagle
- Yearbook: The Eagle Talon
- Revenue: $26,829,000 (district in 2004)
- Website: mhs.rsu18.org

Messalonskee High School is a public high school located in Oakland, Maine, United States. It serves all high school students in the RSU 18 school unit, which includes Oakland, Sidney, Belgrade, China and Rome. The school was founded in 1969 and currently has slightly more than 700 students enrolled. The campus features an 826-seat performing arts center that was built for the school in 1993. In 2005, the district dedicated the Performing Arts Center to former superintendent J. Duke Albanese. Messalonskee is a member of the Kennebec Valley Athletic Conference. Notable alumni include: Nick Mayo (American pro basketball player), Dylan Gagne (Analyst for S&P), and Will McPherson (singer/songwriter).

== Notable alumni ==
- Benjamin Koons (2004), cross-country skier, Olympian who represented New Zealand
- Nick Mayo (2015), basketball player who plays in Japan
