= Medomak Valley High School =

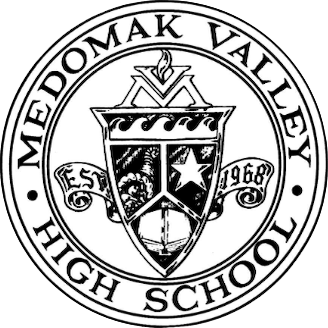

Location
- 320 Manktown Road; Waldoboro, Maine 04572; United States
- 44.12467°N 69.30895°W

Information
- Type: Public high school
- Established: 1968; 58 years ago
- School district: Regional School Unit #40
- Superintendent: Steve Nolan
- Principal: Daniel Joseph
- Teaching staff: 43.30 (FTE)
- Grades: 9–12
- Enrollment: 560 (2023–24)
- Student to teacher ratio: 12.93
- Campus size: 77 acres
- Campus type: Rural
- Colors: Blue and gold
- Athletics conference: Kennebec Valley Athletic Conference
- Mascot: Panther
- Nickname: Panthers
- Rival: Lincoln Academy
- Yearbook: The Valley Echo
- Communities served: Waldoboro, Warren, Union, Washington, Friendship
- Website: rsu40.org/mvhs/

Medomak Valley High School (MVHS) is a public high school in Waldoboro, Maine. The school was established in established in 1968, and educates grades 9–12. The school is part of the Regional School Unit #40, and serves the communities of the Medomak River valley.

== Academics ==
Medomak Valley offers a variety of core courses and electives. The school offers AP Level Courses in English Literature, English Language, Human Geography, U.S. Government & Politics, U.S. History, Microeconomics, Macroeconomics, Calculus, Biology, Physics, and Studio Art. The school also offers a dual enrollment program with Thomas College in which students can earn college credit in a variety of courses including Composition I & II, Literature, Literature & Society, Calculus, Quantitative Analysis, U.S. History, Psychology, Criminal Justice, and Sociology. Medomak Valley also offers Horticulture courses that support the internationally recognized Medomak Valley Heirloom Seed Project. The project was listed as a "117 Projects to Watch in 2017" project by foodtank.com.

== Notable alumni ==
- Aaron Robinson, composer
- Dana Dow, politician
