= Morse High School (Maine) =

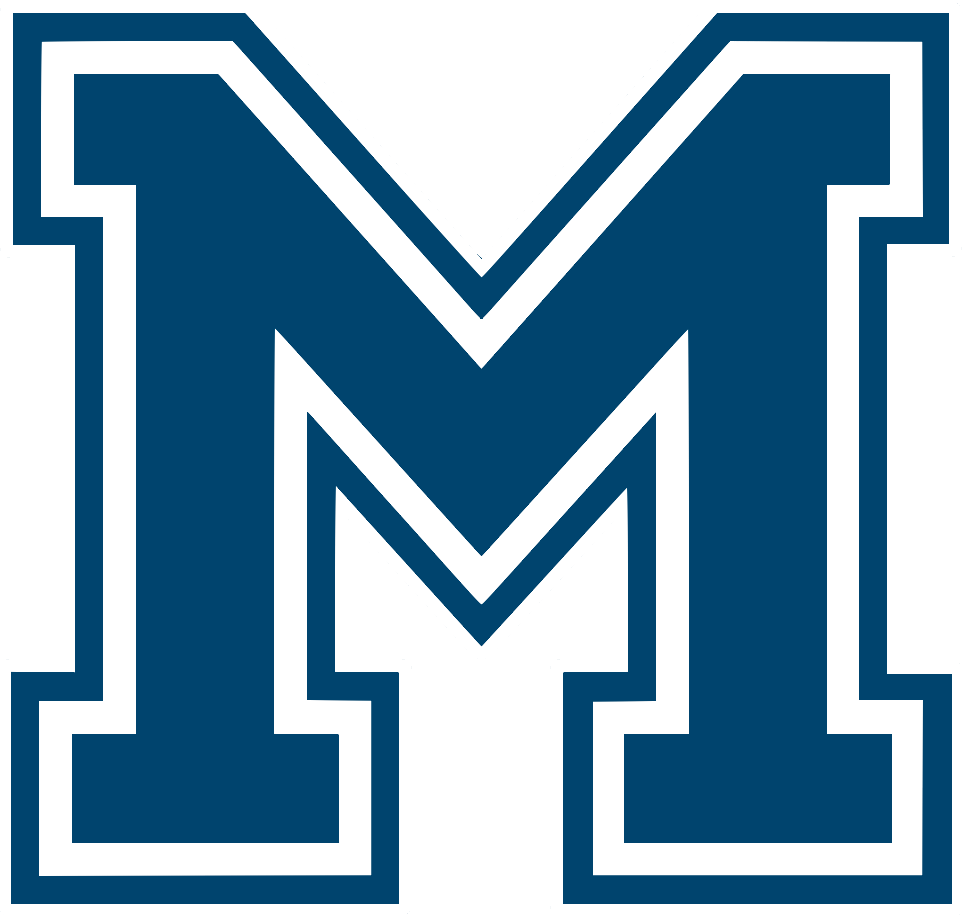

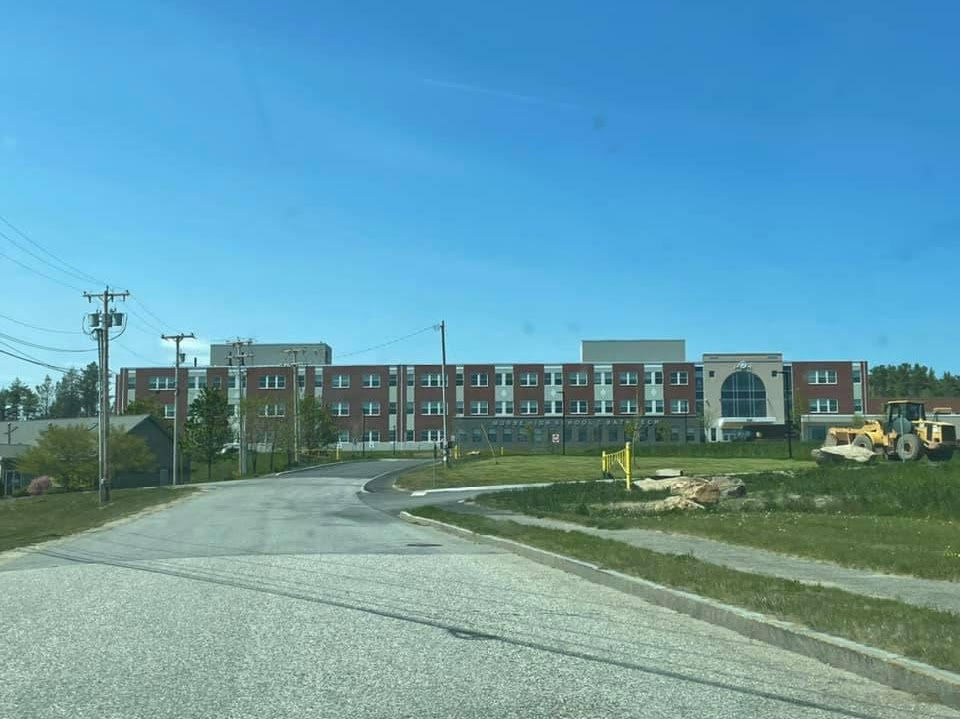

Location
- 826 Shipbuilder Drive; Bath, Maine 04530; United States; 43.9165°N 69.8372°W

Information
- School type: Public secondary school
- Established: 1904
- School district: RSU 1
- Superintendent: Patrick Manuel
- Principal: Eric Varney
- Teaching staff: 41.50 (FTE)
- Grades: 9–12
- Enrollment: 615 (2024–2025)
- Student to teacher ratio: 14.82
- Colors: Royal blue White
- Athletics conference: Kennebec Valley Athletic Conference
- Nickname: Shipbuilders
- Yearbook: Clipper
- Website: mhs.rsu1.org

Morse High School is a public high school in Bath, Maine, and is part of RSU 1. It serves students from Bath, Arrowsic, Phippsburg, Woolwich, Georgetown and West Bath. The school had 615 students in grades 9 through 12 during the 2024–2025 school year.

The school opened under the Morse name in 1904, replacing the earlier Bath High School. It used two different buildings at 826 High Street between 1904 and 2021. In 2021, the school moved to a new campus on Shipbuilder Drive, which it shares with the Bath Regional Career and Technical Center.

== History ==
Secondary education in Bath began before Morse High School was established. Bath Academy, a private school built in 1823, stood on the site that later became the High Street campus and was eventually incorporated into the city school system. A separate Bath High School building opened on High Street in 1860. When Morse High School opened in 1904, the older building became the Central Grammar School.

The Bath High School Alumni Association was created in 1891 and continued to use the Bath High School name after Morse opened. Local sources have said it may be the oldest continuously active high-school alumni association in the United States.

Bath businessman Charles W. Morse gave $75,000 toward construction of a new high school. Maine architect William R. Miller designed the building in 1903 using French Renaissance architectural elements. It opened as Morse High School in 1904.

The first Morse building burned during the night of March 23 and 24, 1928. School records were taken out of the building, but much of the equipment and other material inside was lost.

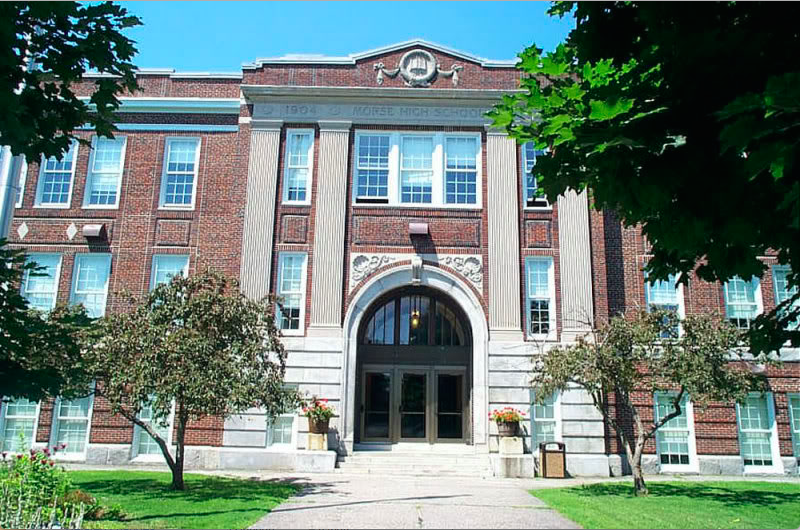
The second Morse High School building at 826 High Street, used from 1929 to 2021.

A replacement building was constructed on the same High Street property and opened in September 1929. It was expanded during World War II, in 1969 and again in 1996.

The building remained in use until partway through the 2020–2021 school year. After the school moved, ownership of the High Street site was transferred to the city of Bath for redevelopment.

Plans for another replacement school moved forward in October 2015, when the RSU 1 board supported constructing a building at a new location. In 2016, the Bath City Council approved an option for the district to purchase 26 acres in the Wing Farm business park.

The new three-story building has about 186,000 square feet (17,300 m^{2}) of space and includes both Morse High School and the Bath Regional Career and Technical Center. It cost $75.3 million. The state provided $67.4 million, with local borrowing and private fundraising covering the remaining cost. Students began classes there on February 25, 2021.

== Programs ==
The Bath Regional Career and Technical Center, often called Bath Tech, is located on the same campus. It offers eleven career and technical education programs for students from Morse High School, Boothbay Region High School, Lincoln Academy and Wiscasset Middle High School.

In October 2024, Morse began allowing some students assigned detention to take part in an optional after-school hike instead. Students need parental permission to participate. The program was created by school counselor Leslie Trundy and received regional and national media attention in 2025.

== Athletics ==
Morse athletic teams are called the Shipbuilders. The school competes in the Kennebec Valley Athletic Conference.
