= Scarborough High School (Maine) =

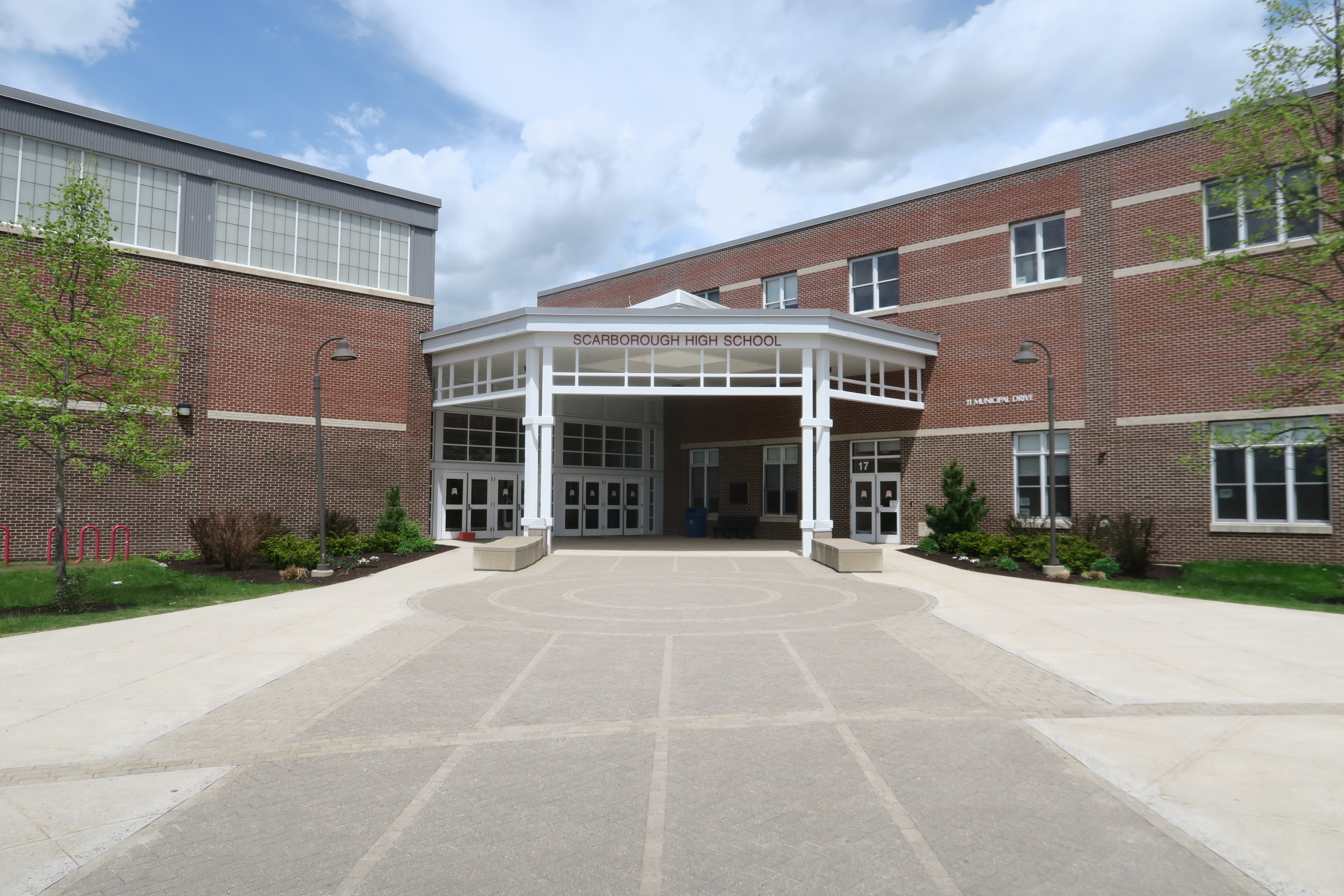
- Scarborough High School

Location
- 11 Municipal Drive; Scarborough, Cumberland County, Maine 04074; United States
- Coordinates: 43°35′30″N 70°20′10″W

Information
- Type: Public high school
- Motto: S T O R M
- Established: 1954
- School district: Scarborough Public Schools
- Superintendent: Geoffrey Bruno
- CEEB code: 200895
- NCES School ID: 231053000325
- Principal: Nathan Theriault
- Staff: 199 (2025)
- Teaching staff: 82.10 (FTE)
- Grades: 9–12
- Gender: Coed
- Age range: 13-22
- Enrollment: 903 (2024-2025)
  - Grade 9: 205
  - Grade 10: 239
  - Grade 11: 241
  - Grade 12: 218
- Student to teacher ratio: 11.00
- Language: English
- Hours in school day: 6:25
- Color
- Mascot: Thunder the lightning bolt
- Nickname: Red Storm
- Team name: Red Storm
- Rival: Thornton Academy
- National ranking: 4971st
- Newspaper: Red Storm Gazette
- Yearbook: Four Corners
- Website: shs.scarboroughschools.org

Scarborough High School is a high school (grades 9–12) located in Scarborough, Maine, United States. The student population was approximately 903 students and around 180 staff and faculty members during the 2024-2025 school year.

== History ==
The first high school in Scarborough was built in 1927 and was named after Elwood G. Bessey, a former principal, and the current high school was built in 1954.

== Athletics ==
Scarborough High School offers 26 varsity teams in 17 sports, with junior varsity/or and freshman teams in 11 sports.

== U.S. News & World Report ==
As of 2025, Scarborough High School is ranked 7th within Maine. Students have the opportunity to take Advanced Placement course work and exams. The AP participation rate at Scarborough High School is 60%. The graduation rate is 93%. The student body makeup is 53% male and 47% female, and the total minority enrollment is 16%. Scarborough High School is the only high school in the Scarborough School Department.
