= Lincoln Academy (Maine) =

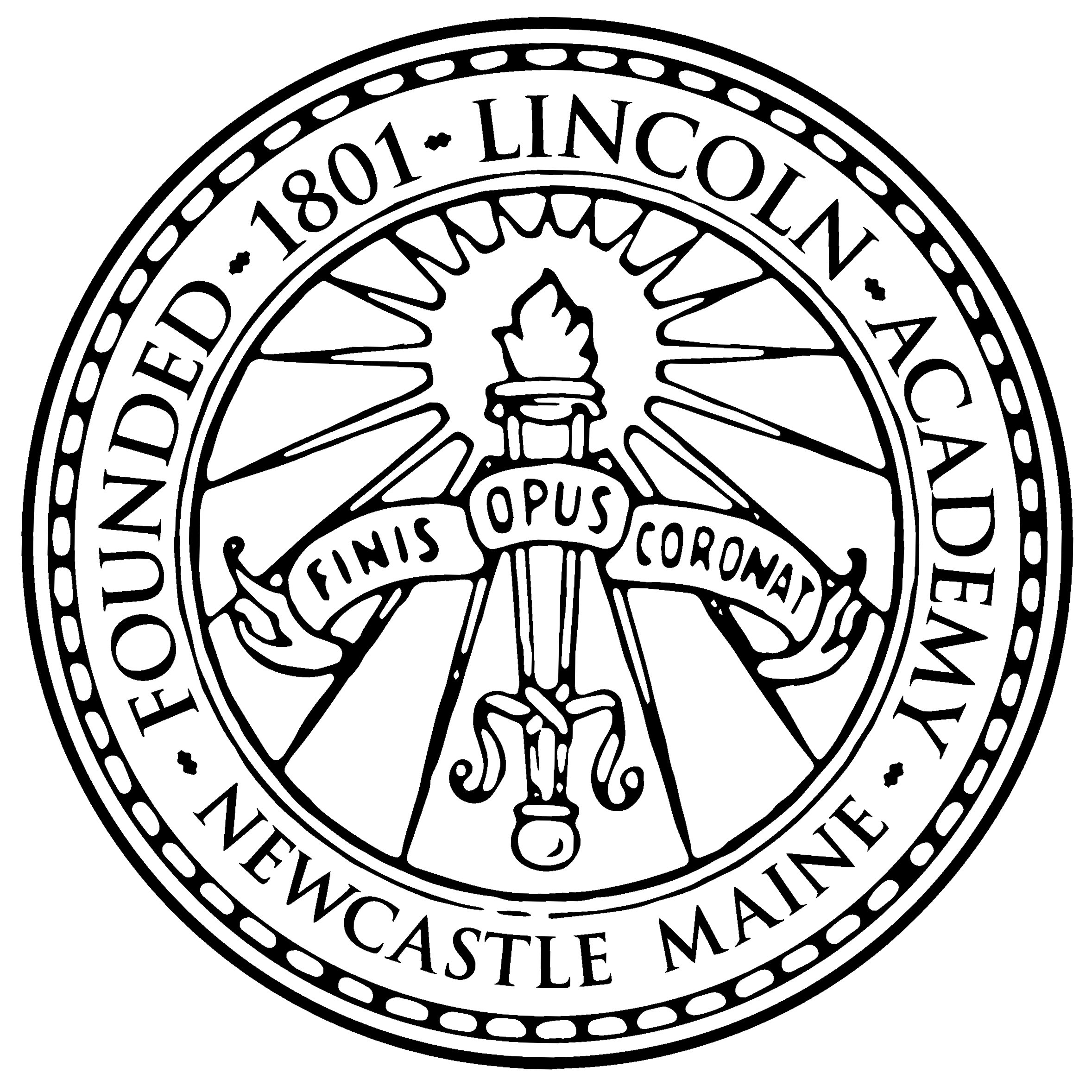

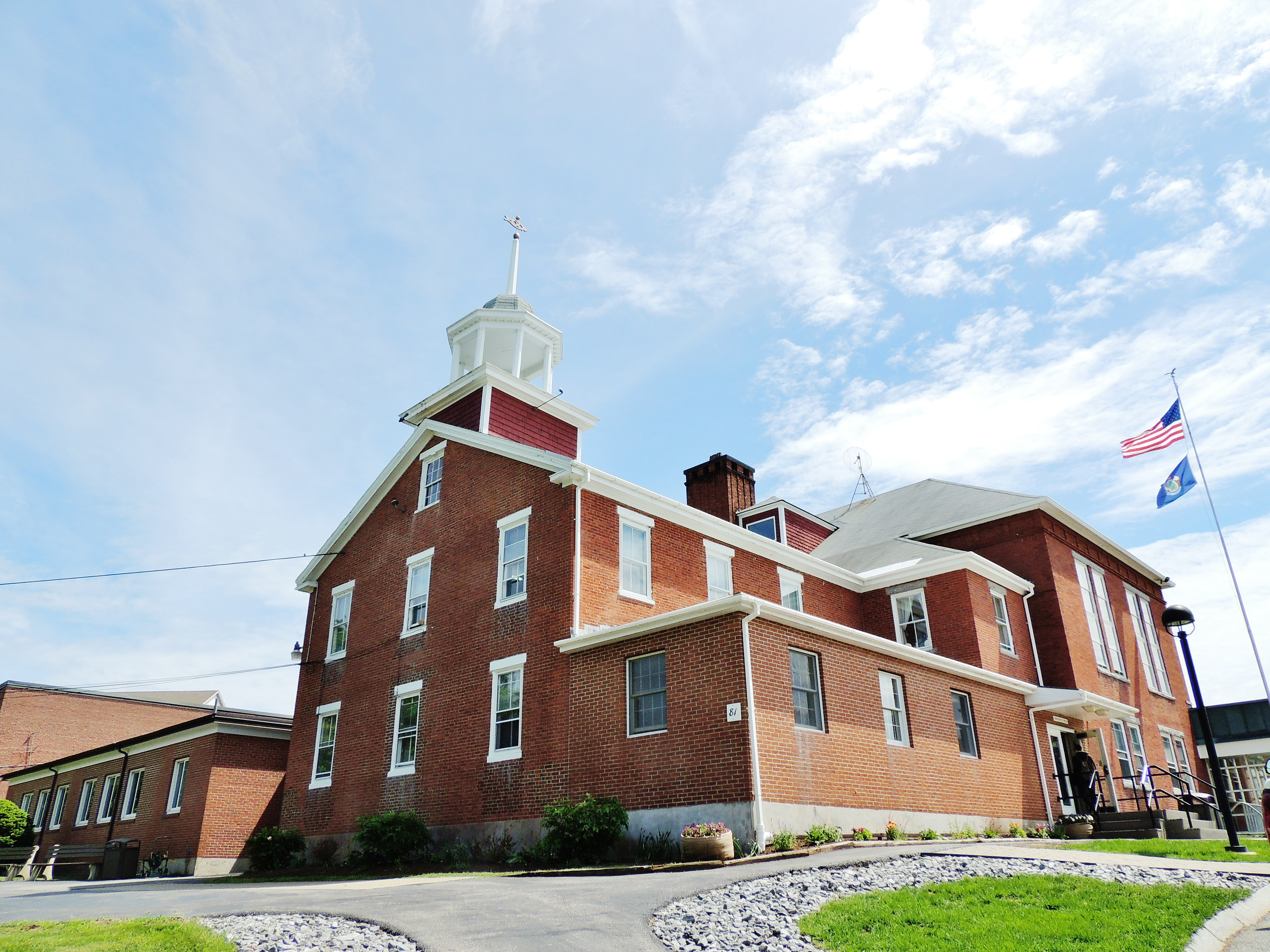

Location
- 81 Academy Hill; Newcastle, Maine 04553; United States; 44°02′20″N 69°32′22″W

Information
- School type: Private, boarding
- Motto: Finis Opus Coronat (The End Crowns the Work)
- Established: 1801; 225 years ago
- Head of school: Jeff Burroughs
- Grades: 9–12
- Enrollment: 570
- Student to teacher ratio: 10:1
- Campus type: Rural
- Colors: Black and white
- Athletics conference: Kennebec Valley Athletic Conference
- Mascot: Eagle
- Nickname: Eagles
- Rival: Medomak Valley High School
- Accreditation: New England Association of Schools and Colleges
- Publication: Aerie Magazine
- Yearbook: Lincolnian
- Tuition: Boarding Students: $49,900; Day Students: $14,500
- Website: lincolnacademy.org

Lincoln Academy is a private boarding and day high school and town academy located in Newcastle, Maine, serving students in Lincoln County, the United States, and other nations around the world. It spans grade levels 9–12. Lincoln Academy is the fourth oldest secondary school in Maine. The majority of Lincoln Academy students live in local "sending towns", including Newcastle, Damariscotta, Bristol, Jefferson, Nobleboro, and South Bristol. The sending towns pay tuition for local students; instead of operating their own public high schools, they pay a private school money to take those students.

== History ==
In 1801, the General Court of Massachusetts established Lincoln Academy to promote "Piety, Religion and Morality". 178 people from nine towns signed the original petition and donated over $3,000 to found the school. Lincoln Academy opened in October 1805 in a wooden building on River Road in Newcastle with 74 students. The tuition cost $257 per year and was paid by students' families. Later in 1828, a fire destroyed the original building and a new one was constructed on Academy Hill road. To this day, the building supporting the bell tower serves as the central building of the high school.

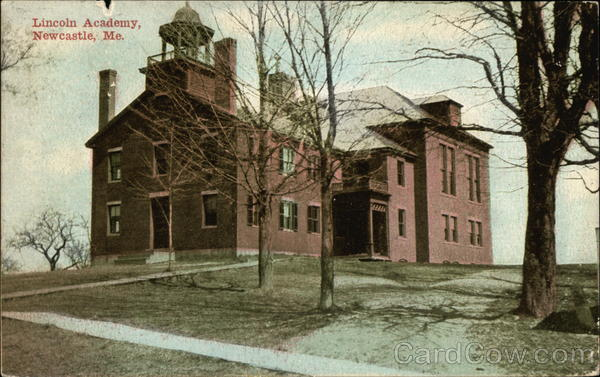
Postcard of Lincoln Academy in 1912

Lincoln Academy formerly served as a "fitting school for Bowdoin College" from 1805 until 1903. The Maine Legislature then passed a law that mandated secondary education be funded by the local towns. As a result, many adults enrolled at LA causing an increase in enrollment and a dramatic change in the nature of the student body. By 1906, the school body was composed of those preparing for Bowdoin College with a required exam for admission. The exam was later discontinued in the 1930s resulting in Lincoln becoming a public high school. Enrollment increased during the 1950s and 1960s and increased again upon the closure of Bristol High School in 1969.

In the 1970s, the school eliminated differentiated diplomas, and course and graduation requirements were increased. Later, the school joined the Bath Regional Vocational Program and then Rockland Vocational Center. Today, Lincoln Academy serves as a private high school for students from surrounding towns. In 2008 the sending towns formed the Central Lincoln County School System or Alternative Organizational Structure 93, which means that now a student in a member town can choose to attend any high school in the state. Circa 2022 most high school students in the AOS 93 area attended Lincoln.

In 2018, the school was met with a dip in enrollment due to fewer Chinese students studying abroad as Lincoln Academy's majority of international students are from China.

The school also stated that "American-style" education models are being used in China, creating less of a demand to study in the United States. Other schools across New England had also suffered from a decline in international student enrollment.

In 2011, Lincoln Academy was $1.25 million in debt with a $5 million endowment. Over several years, the school fell into a $10 million debt with only $7.5 million endowment in 2016. There was conflict within the board of trustees about how to deal with the debt.

Aerial view of the campus with the field and dormitory (bottom middle) opened in 2015

On April 17, 2015, Lincoln Academy opened a newly constructed Cable-Burns Applied Technology and Engineering Center (abbreviated as ATEC) and a new dormitory for residential students. The ATEC building offers flexible, modern classroom space for traditionally-offered courses such as Digital Media Production, Small Engines, Digital Photography, Human Anatomy and Physiology, Computer-Aided Design (CAD), as well as new courses such as Engineering, Invent to Learn, and Metal Sculpture.

The 2015 dorm houses 54 residential students and five faculty families. Having 84 residential students on campus has expanded the diversity of the Lincoln Academy student population and has allowed the school to maintain its budget and wide range of classes during a time of shrinking student population of the Mid Coast.

Also in 2015, a new synthetic surface sports field was opened, named after Lincoln Academy graduate, William A. Clark II. The field's construction was possible because of an anonymous donation. Prior to the construction of the field, Lincoln Academy had "struggled with maintaining an adequate baseball and soccer field". Because of construction of the new dormitory and ATEC building, the conditions of the fields had declined, according to school officials. The school built a new baseball complex on the campus and dedicated Bowers Field in 2016 in honor of a former trustee.

In 2017 the school had a three-week "Eagle Term" where students could take course electives, including those of atypical subjects. This program ended in 2019 due to budget issue.

=== Founders ===
- Rev. Kiah Bayley
- Samuel Nickels
- Rev. Jonathan Ward
- Rev. Alden Bradford
- Hon. Thomas Rice
- Rev. William Riddle
- Thomas McClure
- Rev. John Sawyer
- William McCobb
- David Dennis
- Mr. Matthew Cottrell
- Henry Knox
- Mr. Moses Carlton
- Sir Ashton IV

== Athletics ==
Lincoln Academy has various varsity sports teams, including Baseball, Basketball, Cheerleading, Cross country running, Field hockey, Golf, Lacrosse, Soccer, Swimming, Track and field, Tennis, and Wrestling.

LA is a member of the Kennebec Valley Athletic Conference, and has won several State Championships.

- Boys' Basketball – (Class B) 1989
- Girls' Basketball – (Class B) 1982
- Boys' Cross Country – (Class B) 2017
- Girls' Field Hockey – (Class B) 1987
- Boys' Soccer – (Class B) 1982, 1987
- Boys' Outdoor Track and Field – (Class S) 1959
- Girls' Tennis – (Class B) 2018, 2019, 2022

== Notable alumni ==
- Kate Aldrich (born 1973), mezzo-soprano
- Anna Belknap (active 1996–present), actress
- Glenn Chadbourne (active 1988–present), artist
- Jessica Delfino (born 1976), singer-songwriter and comedian
- Edwin Flye (died 1886), politician and businessman, member of the U.S. House of Representatives
- Ryan Gaul (active 2002–present), actor
- Chloe Maxmin (born 1992), politician, member of the Maine Senate and House of Representatives
- Cameron Reny (active 2022–present), politician, member of the Maine Senate

== See also ==
- Education in Maine

Other private high schools in Maine which take students with public funds (from unorganized areas and/or with agreements with school districts):

- Foxcroft Academy
- George Stevens Academy
- Lee Academy
- Waynflete School
- Washington Academy

Connecticut private academies acting as public high schools:

- Gilbert School
- Norwich Free Academy
- Woodstock Academy

New Hampshire private academies acting as public high schools:

- Coe-Brown Northwood Academy
- Pinkerton Academy
