= Old Orchard Beach High School =

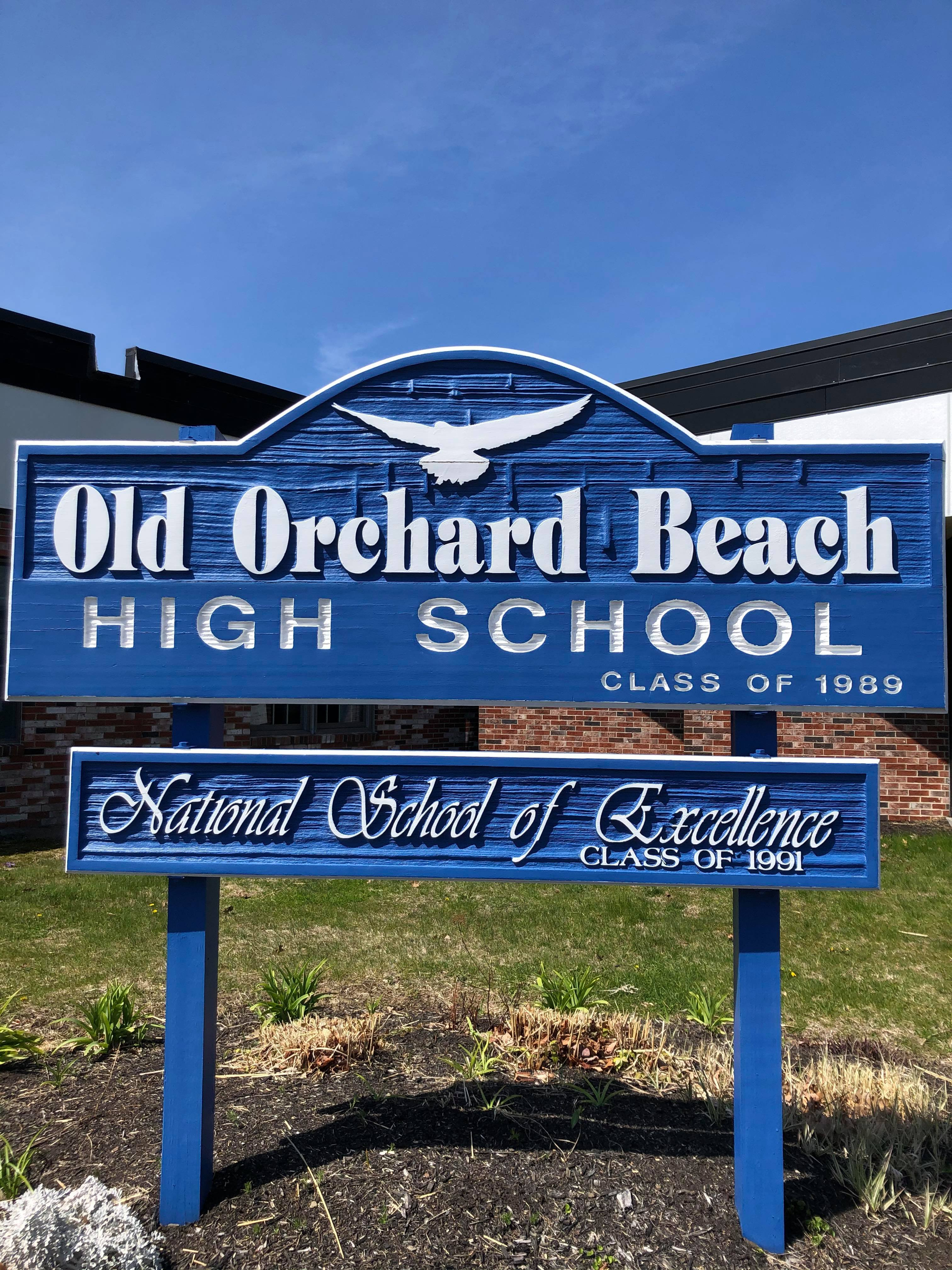
- Building exterior

Location
- 40 E. Emerson Cummings Boulevard; Old Orchard Beach, York, Maine 04064; United States; 43°30′48″N 70°23′32″W

Information
- School type: Public, high school
- School district: Regional School Unit 23
- NCES School ID: 231478400921
- Principal: John Suttie
- Teaching staff: 25.00 (FTE)
- Grades: 9–12
- Student to teacher ratio: 7.96
- Campus size: Small
- Campus type: Suburban
- Colors: Blue and White
- Athletics: Football, Girls Soccer, Golf, X-Country, Boys Basketball, Girls Basketball, Hockey, Baseball, Softball, Track and Field.
- Athletics conference: Class C
- Mascot: Sandy the Seagull
- Nickname: Gulls
- Team name: Seagulls
- Accreditation: NEASC
- Tuition: Free (Public)
- Website: rsu23.org

Old Orchard Beach High School (OOBHS), is a public high school located in Old Orchard Beach, Maine. It is the secondary school for Regional School Unit (RSU) 23, a school district which exclusively serves the town of Old Orchard Beach. It has an enrollment of about 200 students, making it the smallest high school in Southern Maine.

== History ==
The Old Orchard Beach school system was established in 1881 after being separated from the neighboring Saco, Maine school system. Rev. W. W. H. McAllister, who would later be elected the first Supervisor of Schools, lobbied for the establishment of a High School with town officials due to tax incentives from the state. The high school's first day of operation was 25 September 1883.

The school originally resided in what is today Loranger Middle School, another school within RSU 23. The school moved to a new building across from its previous location in the late 1970s.

In 2009, the Saco, Old Orchard Beach, and Dayton school systems combined to form Regional School Unit (RSU) 23 under the state's educational consolidation program. The school systems remained unified until July 2014, when Saco and Dayton withdrew, leaving Old Orchard Beach the sole town in the system. Between 2009 and 2014, OOBHS (with some limited exceptions) still only served residents of Old Orchard Beach, despite being consolidated with the two other townships.

Since 2019, OOBHS has been in a unique situation in that the principal and assistant principal also serve concurrently as superintendent and assistant superintendent, respectively, for the entire RSU 23 school district.

== Notable alumni ==
- Jay Bellerose, drummer
