= List of unorganized territories in Maine =

The unorganized territory (UT) of Maine is the area of Maine that has no local, incorporated municipal government. The unorganized territory consists of 435 townships, primarily heavily forested areas of the state's north, east, and west, along with de-organized municipalities and islands. The UT land area is slightly over one half the area of the entire State of Maine. Year round residents number approximately 9,000, with many more people seasonally residing in the UT.

== List of unorganized territories ==
| Name | County | Population (2020 census) | Land area (sq mil) | Townships within UT |
|---|---|---|---|---|
| Bancroft UT | Aroostook | 57 | 40.4 | Bancroft Township (T1 R2 WELS) |
| Central Aroostook UT | Aroostook | 164 | 594.4 | List: Cox Patent (TD R2 WELS) Dudley Township (T7 R3 WELS) E Township (TE R2 WELS) Oxbow North Township (T9 R6 WELS) Saint Croix Township (T8 R4 WELS) Scopan Township (T10 R4 WELS) Swett Farm Township (T9 R5 WELS) Webbertown Township (T7 R4 WELS) T7 R5 WELS T8 R3 WELS T8 R5 WELS T9 R3 WELS T9 R4 WELS T10 R3 WELS T11 R4 WELS TC R2 WELS TD R2 WELS |
| Connor UT | Aroostook | 418 | 39.3 | Connor Township (TK R2 WELS) |
| Northwest Aroostook UT | Aroostook | 12 | 2,617.5 | List: Big Twenty Township (T20 R11 WELS and T20 R12 WELS) Clayton Lake Township (T11 R14 WELS) T9 R7 WELS T9 R8 WELS T10 R6 WELS T10 R7 WELS T10 R8 WELS T11 R7 WELS T11 R8 WELS T11 R9 WELS T11 R10 WELS T11 R11 WELS T11 R12 WELS T11 R13 WELS T11 R15 WELS T11 R16 WELS T11 R17 WELS T12 R7 WELS T12 R8 WELS T12 R9 WELS T12 R10 WELS T12 R11 WELS T12 R12 WELS T12 R13 WELS T12 R14 WELS T12 R15 WELS T12 R16 WELS T12 R17 WELS T13 R7 WELS T13 R8 WELS T13 R9 WELS T13 R10 WELS T13 R11 WELS T13 R12 WELS T13 R13 WELS T13 R14 WELS T13 R15 WELS T13 R16 WELS T14 R7 WELS T14 R8 WELS T14 R9 WELS T14 R10 WELS T14 R11 WELS T14 R12 WELS T14 R13 WELS T14 R14 WELS T14 R15 WELS T14 R16 WELS T15 R8 WELS T15 R9 WELS T15 R10 WELS T15 R11 WELS T15 R12 WELS T15 R13 WELS T15 R14 WELS T15 R15 WELS T16 R8 WELS T16 R9 WELS T16 R12 WELS T16 R13 WELS T16 R14 WELS T17 R12 WELS T17 R13 WELS T17 R14 WELS T18 R10 WELS T18 R11 WELS T18 R12 WELS T18 R13 WELS T19 R11 WELS T19 R12 WELS |
| South Aroostook UT | Aroostook | 579 | 376.0 | List: Benedicta Township (T2 R5 WELS) Cary Township (T11 R1 WELS) Forkstown Township (T3 R2 WELS) Molunkus Township (TA R5 WELS) North Yarmouth Academy Grant Township (T1 R4 WELS) Silver Ridge Township (T2 R5 WELS) Upper Molunkus Township (T1 R4 WELS) T1 R5 WELS T2 R4 WELS T3 R3 WELS T3 R4 WELS T4 R3 WELS TA R2 WELS |
| Square Lake UT | Aroostook | 706 | 394.0 | List: Cross Lake Township (T17 R5 WELS) Madawaska Lake Township (T16 R4 WELS) Sinclair Township (T17 R4 WELS) Square Lake Township (T16 R5 WELS) Van Buren Cove Township (T17 R3 WELS) T13 R5 WELS T14 R5 WELS T14 R6 WELS T15 R5 WELS T15 R6 WELS T16 R6 WELS |
| East Central Franklin UT | Franklin | 805 | 171.1 | List: Freeman Township (T3 R2 NPC WKR) Madrid Township (T1 R1 WBKP) Mount Abram Township (T4 R1 BKP WKR) Redington Township (T1 R2 WBKP) Salem Township |
| North Franklin UT | Franklin | 41 | 498.9 | List: Alder Stream Township (T2 R5 WBKP) Beattie Township (T2 R8 WBKP) Chain of Ponds Township (T2 R6 WBKP) Coburn Gore (T3 R7 WBKP) Davis Township (T3 R3 WBKP) Gorham Gore (T1 R9 WBKP) Jim Pond Township (T1 R5 WBKP) Kibby Township (T1 R6 WBKP) Lang Township (T2 R3 WBKP) Lowelltown Township (T1 R8 WBKP) Massachusetts Gore (T3 R6 WBKP) Merrill Strip Township (T2 R7 WBKP) Seven Ponds Township (T3 R5 WBKP) Skinner Township (T1 R7 WBKP) Stetsontown Township (T3 R4 WBKP) Tim Pond Township (T2 R4 WBKP) |
| South Franklin UT | Franklin | 60 | 12.4 | Perkins Township; Washington Township |
| West Central Franklin UT | Franklin | 1 | 103.9 | T6 North of Weld; Township D Township E |
| Wyman UT | Franklin | 82 | 20.3 | Wyman Township (T4 R3 BKP WKR) |
| Central Hancock UT | Hancock | 132 | 15.2 | Fletchers Landing Township (T8 SD BPP) |
| East Hancock UT | Hancock | 85 | 443.1 | List: Oqiton Township (T4 ND BPP) T3 ND BPP T7 SD BPP T9 SD BPP T10 SD BPP T16 MD BPP T22 MD BPP T28 MD BPP T34 MD BPP T35 MD BPP T39 MD BPP T40 MD BPP T41 MD BPP |
| Marshall Island UT | Hancock | 0 | 1.6 | Marshall Island |
| Northwest Hancock UT | Hancock | 2 | 40.9 | T32 MD BPP |
| Unity UT | Kennebec | 36 | 10.4 | Unity Township |
| Criehaven UT | Knox | 4 | 0.5 | Criehaven Township |
| Muscle Ridge Islands UT | Knox | 9 | 0.9 | Muscle Ridge Township |
| Hibberts Gore | Lincoln | 1 | 0.7 | Hibberts Gore |
| Louds Island UT | Lincoln | 3 | 1.6 | Louds Island |
| Milton UT | Oxford | 150 | 14.9 | Milton Township |
| North Oxford UT | Oxford | 61 | 557.2 | List: Adamstown Township (T4 R2 WBKP) Andover North Surplus Township Andover West Surplus Township Bowmantown Township (T4 R6 WBKP) C Surplus Township Grafton Township (TA No. 2) Lower Cupsuptic Township (T4 R3 WBKP) Lynchtown Township (T5 R4 WBKP) Magalloway Township (T5 R1 WBKP) Oxbow Township (T4 R5 WBKP) Parkertown Township (T5 R3 WBKP) Parmachenee Township (T5 R5 WBKP) Richardsontown Township (T4 R1 WBKP) Riley Township (TA No. 1) Township C Upper Cupsuptic Township (T4 R4 WBKP) |
| South Oxford UT | Oxford | 591 | 97.1 | Albany Township; Batchelders Grant Township; Mason Township |
| Argyle UT | Penobscot | 255 | 27.3 | Argyle Township (T3 OIP WPR) |
| Drew UT (Note: Following the de-organization of Drew Plantation in 2023, it formed a newly contiguous UT with Kingman and Prentiss. The three will likely be combined into a single UT prior to the 2030 census.) | Penobscot | 26 | 38.0 | Drew Township (T7 R4 NBPP) |
| East Central Penobscot UT | Penobscot | 308 | 114.5 | Grand Falls Township (T2 ND BPP); Greenfield Township (T38 MD BPP); Summit Township (T1 ND BPP) |
| Kingman UT | Penobscot | 137 | 25.0 | Kingman Township (T6 R4 NBPP) |
| North Penobscot UT | Penobscot | 405 | 1,051.9 | List: Cedar Lake Township (T3 R9 NWP) Grindstone Township (T1 R7 WELS) Herseytown Township (T2 R6 WELS) Hopkins Academy Grant Township Long A Township (TA R8 WELS and TA R9 WELS) Mattamiscontis Township (T1 R7 NWP) Soldiertown Township (T2 R7 WELS) T3 Indian Purchase Township (T3 IP) T4 Indian Purchase Township (T4 IP) Veazie Gore T1 R6 WELS T1 R8 WELS T2 R8 NWP T2 R8 WELS T2 R9 NWP T3 R7 WELS T3 R8 WELS T4 R7 WELS T4 R8 WELS T5 R7 WELS T5 R8 WELS T6 R6 WELS T6 R7 WELS T6 R8 WELS T7 R6 WELS T7 R7 WELS T7 R8 WELS T8 R6 WELS T8 R7 WELS T8 R8 WELS TA R7 WELS |
| Prentiss UT | Penobscot | 169 | 38.2 | Prentiss Township (T7 R3 NBPP) |
| Twombly Ridge UT | Penobscot | 0 | 44.0 | Twombly Ridge Township (T3 R1 NBPP) |
| Whitney UT | Penobscot | 6 | 10.9 | Pukakon Township (T5 R1 NBPP) |
| Blanchard UT | Piscataquis | 91 | 44.3 | Blanchard Township (T3 R3 BKP EKR) |
| Northeast Piscataquis UT | Piscataquis | 304 | 1,708.1 | List: Barnard Township (T6 R8 NWP) Bowdoin College Grant East Township (T7 R10 NWP) Bowdoin College Grant West Township (T8 R10 NWP) Ebeemee Township (T5 R9 NWP) Elliottsville Township (T8 R9 NWP) Frenchtown Township (TA R13 WELS) [part] Katahdin Iron Works Township (T6 R9 NWP) Lily Bay Township (TA R14 WELS) [part] Mount Katahdin Township (T3 R9 WELS) Nesourdnahunk Township (T5 R10 WELS) Rainbow Township (T2 R11 WELS) Shawtown Township (TA R12 WELS) Soper Mountain Township (T8 R12 WELS) [part] Trout Brook Township (T6 R9 WELS) Williamsburg Township (T6 R8 NWP) T1 R9 WELS T1 R10 WELS T1 R11 WELS T1 R12 WELS T1 R13 WELS [part] T2 R9 WELS T2 R10 WELS T2 R12 WELS [part] T2 R13 WELS [part] T3 R10 WELS T3 R11 WELS [part] T3 R12 WELS [part] T4 R9 NWP T4 R9 WELS T4 R10 WELS T4 R11 WELS [part] T5 R9 WELS T5 R11 WELS [part] T6 R10 WELS T6 R11 WELS [part] T6 R12 WELS [part] T7 R9 NWP T7 R9 WELS T7 R10 WELS T7 R11 WELS [part] T8 R9 WELS T8 R10 WELS T8 R11 WELS [part] T9 R9 WELS T9 R10 WELS T9 R11 WELS [part] T9 R12 WELS [part] T10 R10 WELS T10 R11 WELS T10 R12 WELS [part] T10 R13 WELS [part] T10 R9 WELS TA R10 WELS TA R11 WELS TB R10 WELS TB R11 WELS |
| Northwest Piscataquis UT | Piscataquis | 134 | 1,370.4 | List: Big Moose Township (T2 R6 BKP EKR) Chesuncook Township (T5 R13 WELS) Cove Point Township Days Academy Grant Township Eagle Lake Township (T8 R13 WELS) East Middlesex Canal Grant Township Frenchtown Township (TA R13 WELS) [part] Harfords Point Township Kineo Township Lily Bay Township (TA R14 WELS) [part] Lobster Township (T3 R14 WELS) Moosehead Junction Township (T3 R5 BKP EKR) Northeast Carry Township (T3 R15 WELS) Piscataquis County Islands Soper Mountain Township (T8 R12 WELS) [part] Spencer Bay Township (T1 R14 WELS) T1 R13 WELS [part] T2 R12 WELS [part] T2 R13 WELS [part] T3 R11 WELS [part] T3 R12 WELS [part] T3 R13 WELS T4 R11 WELS [part] T4 R12 WELS T4 R13 WELS T4 R14 WELS T4 R15 WELS T5 R11 WELS [part] T5 R12 WELS T5 R14 WELS T5 R15 WELS T6 R11 WELS [part] T6 R12 WELS [part] T6 R13 WELS T6 R14 WELS T6 R15 WELS T7 R11 WELS [part] T7 R12 WELS T7 R13 WELS T7 R14 WELS T7 R15 WELS T8 R11 WELS [part] T8 R14 WELS T8 R15 WELS T9 R11 WELS [part] T9 R12 WELS [part] T9 R13 WELS T9 R14 WELS T9 R15 WELS T10 R12 WELS [part] T10 R13 WELS [part] T10 R14 WELS T10 R15 WELS TX R14 WELS |
| Southeast Piscataquis UT | Piscataquis | 487 | 75.1 | Atkinson Township (T2 R6 NWP); Orneville Township (T1 R6 NWP) |
| Perkins UT | Sagadahoc | 0 | 2.3 | Perkins Township Swan Island |
| Central Somerset UT | Somerset | 336 | 76.7 | Concord Township (T1 R1 BKP WKR); Lexington Township (T2 R1 BKP WKR) |
| Northeast Somerset UT | Somerset | 367 | 483.9 | List: Bald Mountain Township (T2 R3 BKP EKR) Brassua Township (T2 R2 NBKP) [part] Chase Stream Township (T1 R6 BKP WKR) East Moxie Township (T2 R4 BKP EKR) Indian Stream Township (T1 R6 BKP EKR) Johnson Mountain Township (T2 R6 BKP WKR) [part] Long Pond Township (T3 R1 NBKP) Mayfield Township (T2 R2 BKP EKR) Misery Gore Misery Township (T2 R7 BKP WKR) Moxie Gore (T1 R5 BKP EKR) Parlin Pond Township (T3 R7 BKP WKR) [part] Rockwood Strip (T1 R1 NBKP) Rockwood Strip (T2 R1 NBKP) Sandbar Tract Township Sandwich Academy Grant Township (T2 R1 NBKP) Sapling Township (T1 R7 BKP WKR) Soldiertown Township (T2 R3 NBKP) [part] Squaretown Township (T2 R5 BKP EKR) Taunton and Raynham Academy Grant Township (T1 R1 NBKP) Thorndike Township (T3 R2 NBKP) [part] Tomhegan Township (T1 R2 NBKP) [part] |
| Northwest Somerset UT | Somerset | 41 | 656.8 | List: Appleton Township (T6 R7 BKP WKR) Attean Township (T5 R1 NBKP) Bigelow Township (T4 R3 BKP WKR) Bowtown Township (T1 R4 BKP WKR) Bradstreet Township (T4 R7 BKP WKR) Carrying Place Township (T1 R3 BKP WKR) Carrying Place Town Township (T2 R3 BKP WKR) Dead River Township (T3 R3 BKP WKR) Flagstaff Township (T4 R4 BKP WKR) Forsyth Township (T6 R2 NBKP) Haynestown Township (T5 R6 BKP WKR) Hobbstown Township (T4 R6 BKP WKR) Holeb Township (T6 R1 NBKP) Johnson Mountain Township (T2 R6 BKP WKR) [part] King and Bartlett Township (T4 R5 BKP WKR) Lower Enchanted Township (T2 R5 BKP WKR) Parlin Pond Township (T3 R7 BKP WKR) [part] Pierce Pond Township (T2 R4 BKP WKR) Rayton Township (T5 R7 BKP WKR) Spencer Township (T3 R5 BKP WKR) Spring Lake Township (T3 R4 BKP WKR) Upper Enchanted Township (T3 R6 BKP WKR) |
| Seboomook Lake UT | Somerset | 23 | 1,400.9 | List: Alder Brook Township (T3 R3 NBKP) Bald Mountain Township (T4 R3 NBKP) Big Six Township (T6 R19 WELS) Big Ten Township (T10 R17 WELS) Big W Township (TW R3 NBKP) Blake Gore (T5 R4 NBKP) Brassua Township (T2 R2 NBKP) [part] Comstock Township (T4 R18 WELS) Dole Brook Township (T3 R5 NBKP) Elm Stream Township (T4 R16 WELS) Hammond Township (T3 R4 NBKP) Little W Township (TW R3 NBKP) Pittston Academy Grant Township (T2 R4 NBKP) Plymouth Township (T1 R4 NBKP) Prentiss Township (T4 R4 NBKP) Russell Pond Township (T5 R16 WELS) Saint John Township (T6 R16 WELS) Sandy Bay Township (T5 R3 NBKP) Seboomook Township (T4 R4 NBKP) Soldiertown Township (T2 R3 NBKP) [part] Thorndike Township (T3 R2 NBKP) [part] Tomhegan Township (T1 R2 NBKP) [part] West Middlesex Canal Grant Township (T1 R3 NBKP) T4 R17 WELS T4 R5 NBKP T5 R17 WELS T5 R18 WELS T5 R19 WELS T5 R20 WELS T6 R17 WELS T6 R18 WELS T7 R16 WELS T7 R17 WELS T7 R18 WELS T7 R19 WELS T8 R16 WELS T8 R17 WELS T8 R18 WELS T8 R19 WELS T9 R16 WELS T9 R17 WELS T9 R18 WELS T10 R16 WELS |
| East Central Washington UT | Washington | 724 | 207.2 | List: Berry Township (T18 ED BPP) Cathance Township (T14 ED BPP) Edmunds Township (T10 ED BPP) Marion Township (T13 ED BPP) Trescott Township (T9 ED BPP) T19 ED BPP |
| North Washington UT | Washington | 518 | 975.5 | List: Big Lake Township (T21 ED BPP) Brookton Township (T9 R3 NBPP) Centerville Township (T23 MD BPP) Codyville Township (T9 R2 NBPP) Day Block Township (T31 MD BPP) Devereaux Township (T29 MD BPP) Dyer Township (T1 R2 TS) Forest Township (T10 R3 NBPP) Forest City Township (T9 R4 NBPP) Fowler Township (T1 R1 TS) Greenlaw Chopping Township (T27 ED BPP) Hillgrove Township (T11 R3 NBPP) Kossuth Township (T7 R2 NBPP) Lambert Lake Township (T1 R3 TS) Sakom Township (T5 ND BPP) T6 ND BPP T6 R1 NBPP T8 R3 NBPP T8 R4 NBPP T18 MD BPP T19 MD BPP T24 MD BPP T25 MD BPP T26 ED BPP T30 MD BPP T36 MD BPP T37 MD BPP T42 MD BPP T43 MD BPP |

== Education ==
The Maine Department of Education takes responsibility for coordinating school assignments in the unorganized territories.

The department itself operates the following public schools in unorganized territories. As of 2025 state-operated schools in unorganized territory are:

- Connor Consolidated School - Connor Township, Aroostook County
- Edmunds Consolidated School - Edmunds Township, Washington County
- Kingman Elementary School - Kingman, Penobscot County

The department previously operated:

- Benedicta Elementary School in Benedicta Township, Aroostook County.
- Brookton Elementary School in Brookton, Washington County. - Closed in 1995.
- Rockwood Elementary School in Rockwood Township, Somerset County.
- Patrick Therriault School in Sinclair Township, Aroostook County.

As of 1998 these schools do not have their own school boards.

== See also ==
- List of municipalities in Maine
