= Lee Academy (Maine) =

Location
- 26 Winn Road; Lee, Maine 04455; United States; 45°21′40″N 68°17′10″W

Information
- Type: Private
- Established: 1845; 181 years ago
- Head of school: Kevin Ritchie
- Grades: 9–12
- Sports: Basketball, Soccer, Baseball, Softball, Tennis, Volleyball, Cross Country, and Ski Team
- Mascot: Panda
- Newspaper: Entropy
- Website: www.leeacademy.org

Lee Academy (LA) is a private boarding and day high school in Lee, Maine, United States, founded in 1845 as a teacher training school, and now serving grades 9–12. The school is paid by the area school district for Lee, Maine School Administrative District 30, to take students at the high school level. Additionally, in the case of unorganized areas, the Maine Department of Education pays the school to take students for high school.

Due to these factors, Nick Sambides Jr. of the Bangor Daily News described the school as "semi-public".

== History ==
=== Overseas expansion ===
In 2005 Bruce Lindberg became the headmaster of the school. The board of trustees told him that the school may close if he does not find ways of the school getting additional money. Lindberg decided to get international students to accomplish this goal.

In 2005, Lee Academy signed an agreement with officials in the People's Republic of China to establish the first American-style high school in China. The agreement called for schools to be established in Shenzhen, Shijiazhuang and Chengdu.

In September 2009, the Shenzhen American International School, a satellite school of Lee Academy, opened in Shenzhen, China. It had a principal from Orono, Maine and five teachers.

Lee Academy operates Daegu International School, Daegu, Korea in a partnership with the City of Daegu. Daegu International School is a K–12 High School servicing 317 International and Korean Students.

In 2013, the school had 270 students, with 128 originating from outside of the United States. Sambides characterized Lindberg as having accomplished a lot for the school. That year, Gus LeBlanc became the headmaster.

In more recent years Lee Academy has expanded further into China opening a Fine Arts Specialty High School in Shanghai, China. American Lee Academy International School - Shanghai is a four-year college preparatory high school providing students in Shanghai, China with a US high school education with concentrations in animation, art, music, dance and theater. Lee Academy also has a 3 + 0 partnership with Lishui Foreign Language International School in Lishui, China. The Lishui program has Lee Academy staff stationed at the school in China where students take Lee Academy courses. A summer program on the Lee Academy campus in Lee, Maine is also a requirement of the program.

== Faculty & staff ==
As of September 2015, Lee academy has 39 faculty and Staff members, 23 of which are teachers.

== Catchment ==
Maine School Administrative District 30, which covers the towns of Lee, Lakeville, Springfield, and Winn, and the plantations of Carroll, Macwahoc, Reed, and Webster (and which covered Drew when it was a plantation), directly operates elementary and middle schools but assigns all high school students to Lee Academy with tuition paid to that school. MSAD 30 specifically has a contract with Lee to have high school students educated.

In 2012 there were students from Greenbush, Topsfield, Vanceboro, and Passamaquoddy areas who attended Lee.

As of 2025 the Maine Department of Education, which takes responsibility for coordinating school assignments in the unorganized territories, assigns the Drew, Kingman, Prentiss, and Whitney (Pukakon Township) areas in Penobscot County to Lee Academy, along with some parts of Aroostook County. It also assigns Lambert Lake in Washington County to Lee. It also lists Lee Academy as one option for residents of Brookton, also in Washington County. When Bancroft, Maine de-organized, its secondary students were assigned by the state to the Lee schools.

In 1997 the Maine Labor Relations Board stated that the school is classified as private under Maine Education Law while "it performs most of the educational functions that would be performed by a public high school."

== Student body ==
As of September 2016, Lee Academy has 82 international students, 135 local students, making 217 overall. Lee Academy has a diverse student body with students from twenty-six countries and sixteen Maine communities.

== Operations ==
In 2012 Lindberg stated that almost all high schools in the northern part of the state have "no-growth budgeting" but Lee Academy does not automatically do this due to the revenue from international students.

== Academic performance ==
In 2012 the Maine Department of Education made a grading regimen where it only measured the academic performance of the MSAD contract students and did not include the performances of any other students, including international students, and gave Lee Academy an "F" grade solely based on the MSAD students. This is because the state counted students who were in a sort of public school system (that is the MSAD students) but did not count students who were not in a public school system (in other words, the other students). Both LeBlanc and Lindberg criticized the grading mechanism.

== Extracurricular activities ==
As of 2015, Lee Academy offers seasonal sports. The fall sports at Lee Academy are Soccer, Cross Country, and Volleyball. The winter sports are Basketball, Cheering and Skiing. The spring sports are Baseball, Softball, and Tennis. Lee Academy offers a fall musical. In March the French club goes to Quebec City. Lee Academy also has of variety of other activities including Math team, photography club, ethnic cooking, and Entropy, to name a few. Most recently, the Academy has offered an Outing Club to students providing an opportunity to explore and enjoy the great Maine outdoors.

Lee Academy has an annual Lee Academy Sports Hall of Fame celebrate to recognize outstanding alumni who have distinguished themselves as significant contributors to Lee Academy athletic teams.

The Arts are a focus of the additional offerings as Lee Academy. The Academy has been a perennial top performer in the One Act competition through the Maine Principals' Association. Concert and Jazz Band are both important and strong components of the fine arts offerings at Lee Academy. The Academy has Studio Arts and Digital Photography offerings as part of the arts offerings. Each year Lee Academy sponsors a celebration of the arts through All for the Arts night.

Lee Academy has a successful Post Graduate Basketball team which fields both an A and B team which compete in the NEPSEC athletic conference.

== Notable people ==
- Tobi Lawal, NBA player for Dallas Mavericks, college basketball player
- Everett McLeod, State Representative and Trustee

== See also ==
- Education in Maine

Other private high schools in Maine which take students with public funds (from unorganized areas and/or with agreements with school districts):

- Foxcroft Academy
- George Stevens Academy
- Lincoln Academy
- Waynflete School
- Washington Academy

Connecticut private academies acting as public high schools:

- Gilbert School
- Norwich Free Academy
- Woodstock Academy

New Hampshire private academies acting as public high schools:

- Coe-Brown Northwood Academy
- Pinkerton Academy
