= North Washington, Maine =

- Unorganized territory
- Location within Maine Location within the United States
- Coordinates: 45°10′51″N 67°45′50″W
- Country: United States
- State: Maine
- County: Washington

Area
  - Total: 979.6 sq mi (2,537.2 km^{2})
  - Land: 886.1 sq mi (2,295.0 km^{2})
  - Water: 93.5 sq mi (242.2 km^{2})
- Elevation: 446 ft (136 m)

Population (2020)
  - Total: 505
  - Density: 0.570/sq mi (0.220/km^{2})
- Time zone: UTC-5 (Eastern (EST))
  - Summer (DST): UTC-4 (EDT)
- ZIP Codes: 04413 (Brookton); 04454 (Lambert Lake); 04490 (Topsfield); 04491 (Vanceboro; 04623 (Columbia Falls); 04622 (Cherryfield); 04654 (Machias); 04686 (Wesley); 04668 (Princeton)
- Area code: 207
- FIPS code: 23-53500
- GNIS feature ID: 582637

North Washington is an unorganized territory in Washington County, Maine, United States. The population was 505 at the 2020 census.

== Geography ==
According to the United States Census Bureau, the unorganized territory has a total area of 979.6 square miles (2,537.2 km^{2}), of which 886.1 square miles (2,295.0 km^{2}) is land and 93.5 square miles (242.2 km^{2}), or 9.55%, is water.

The territory consists of 29 townships:

- Big Lake
- Brookton
- Centerville
- Codyville
- Day Block
- Devereaux
- Dyer
- Forest
- Forest City
- Fowler
- Greenlaw Chopping
- Kilgore (T11 R3)
- Kossuth
- Lambert Lake
- Sakom
- T6 ND BPP
- T6 R1 NBPP (Lennox)
- T8 R3 NBPP (Stetson)
- T8 R4 NBPP (East Drew, not be confused with West Drew in Penobscot County)
- T18 MD BPP
- T19 MD BPP (Montegail)
- T24 MD BPP
- T25 MD BPP
- T26 ED BPP
- T30 MD BPP
- T36 MD BPP
- T37 MD BPP
- T42 MD BPP
- T43 MD BPP

== Demographics ==
Historical population
Census	Pop.	Note	%±
1970	500		—
1980	393		−21.4%
1990	496		26.2%
2000	547		10.3%
2010	499		−8.8%
2020	505		1.2%
U.S. Decennial Census

As of the census of 2000, there were 547 people, 232 households, and 157 families residing in the unorganized territory. The population density was 0.6 inhabitants per square mile (0.23/km^{2}). There were 1,044 housing units at an average density of 1.2 per square mile (0.46/km^{2}). The racial makeup of the unorganized territory was 95.25% White, 0.18% Black or African American, 3.47% Native American, 0.55% from other races, and 0.55% from two or more races. Hispanic or Latino of any race were 0.73% of the population.

There were 232 households, out of which 26.7% had children under the age of 18 living with them, 56.0% were married couples living together, 5.6% had a female householder with no husband present, and 32.3% were non-families. 28.0% of all households were made up of individuals, and 10.3% had someone living alone who was 65 years of age or older. The average household size was 2.36 and the average family size was 2.85.

In the unorganized territory the population was spread out, with 22.3% under the age of 18, 6.6% from 18 to 24, 26.1% from 25 to 44, 29.6% from 45 to 64, and 15.4% who were 65 years of age or older. The median age was 42 years. For every 100 females, there were 105.6 males. For every 100 females age 18 and over, there were 105.3 males.

The median income for a household in the unorganized territory was $29,135, and the median income for a family was $30,375. Males had a median income of $38,375 versus $16,705 for females. The per capita income for the unorganized territory was $15,687. About 18.9% of families and 21.7% of the population were below the poverty line, including 24.3% of those under age 18 and 21.6% of those age 65 or over.

== Education ==
The Maine Department of Education takes responsibility for coordinating school assignments in the unorganized territory.
