= Bancroft, Maine =

- Unorganized territory
- Location of Bancroft, Maine
- Coordinates: 45°43′07″N 67°58′30″W
- Country: United States
- State: Maine
- County: Aroostook
- Villages: Bancroft; North Bancroft; South Bancroft

Area
  - Total: 40.99 sq mi (106.16 km^{2})
  - Land: 40.43 sq mi (104.71 km^{2})
  - Water: 0.56 sq mi (1.45 km^{2})
- Elevation: 469 ft (143 m)

Population (2020)
  - Total: 57
  - Density: 1.3/sq mi (0.5/km^{2})
- Time zone: UTC-5 (Eastern (EST))
  - Summer (DST): UTC-4 (EDT)
- ZIP Codes: 04497 (Bancroft); 04424 (Danforth)
- Area code: 207
- FIPS code: 23-02760
- GNIS feature ID: 582339

Bancroft is a township in Aroostook County, Maine, United States. The population was 57 at the 2020 census. On July 1, 2015, the town voted to deorganize and become unorganized territory.

== History ==
Prior to de-organization, the population was decreasing in size. Multiple residents in the community had already served terms in town government. Residents reported being exhausted of having to do duties, as the ages of the town residents increased, and that there were fewer and fewer people qualified and interested in holding such positions. Attendance at town meetings had declined too.

== Geography ==
According to the United States Census Bureau, the township has a total area of 40.99 square miles (106.16 km^{2}), of which 40.43 square miles (104.71 km^{2}) is land and 0.56 square miles (1.45 km^{2}) is water.

== Demographics ==
Historical population
Census	Pop.	Note	%±
1850	157		—
1860	304		93.6%
1870	177		−41.8%
1880	220		24.3%
1890	264		20.0%
1900	318		20.5%
1910	344		8.2%
1920	315		−8.4%
1930	245		−22.2%
1940	216		−11.8%
1950	165		−23.6%
1960	94		−43.0%
1970	53		−43.6%
1980	61		15.1%
1990	66		8.2%
2000	61		−7.6%
2010	68		11.5%
2020	57		−16.2%
U.S. Decennial Census

=== 2010 census ===
As of the census of 2010, there were 68 people, 34 households, and 20 families living in the town. The population density was 1.7 inhabitants per square mile (0.7/km^{2}). There were 94 housing units at an average density of 2.3 per square mile (0.9/km^{2}). The racial makeup of the town was 100.0% White. Hispanic or Latino of any race were 2.9% of the population.

There were 34 households, of which 8.8% had children under the age of 18 living with them, 52.9% were married couples living together, 2.9% had a female householder with no husband present, 2.9% had a male householder with no wife present, and 41.2% were non-families. 41.2% of all households were made up of individuals, and 17.7% had someone living alone who was 65 years of age or older. The average household size was 2.00 and the average family size was 2.65.

The median age in the town was 55 years. 16.2% of residents were under the age of 18; 5.9% were between the ages of 18 and 24; 10.3% were from 25 to 44; 32.4% were from 45 to 64; and 35.3% were 65 years of age or older. The gender makeup of the town was 51.5% male and 48.5% female.

=== 2000 census ===
As of the census of 2000, there were 61 people, 24 households, and 16 families living in the town. The population density was 1.5 inhabitants per square mile (0.58/km^{2}). There were 82 housing units at an average density of 2.1 per square mile (0.81/km^{2}). The racial makeup of the town was 100.00% White.

There were 24 households, out of which 29.2% had children under the age of 18 living with them, 45.8% were married couples living together, 12.5% had a female householder with no husband present, and 33.3% were non-families. 33.3% of all households were made up of individuals, and 16.7% had someone living alone who was 65 years of age or older. The average household size was 2.54 and the average family size was 3.25.

In the town the population was spread out, with 37.7% under the age of 18, 24.6% from 25 to 44, 24.6% from 45 to 64, and 13.1% who were 65 years of age or older. The median age was 40 years. For every 100 females, there were 103.3 males. For every 100 females age 18 and over, there were 100.0 males.

The median income for a household in the town was $16,250, and the median income for a family was $21,250. Males had a median income of $17,500 versus $18,750 for females. The per capita income for the town was $9,760. There were 8.3% of families and 17.5% of the population living below the poverty line, including 33.3% of under eighteens and none of those over 64.

== Education ==
The Maine Department of Education takes responsibility for coordinating school assignments in the unorganized territories. As of 2025 the state assigns Bancroft to the East Grand School in Danforth.

When Bancroft was a town, it was under the Bancroft School District. When Bancroft de-organized, eight children were at an age where they could go to school. At the time, the state assigned elementary students to Kingman Township, Maine schools and secondary students to Lee, Maine schools. The school in Kingman Township is Kingman Elementary School (a school in the unorganized territory operated by the Maine Department of Education). The secondary schools of the Lee system are Mt. Jefferson Junior High School (of Maine School Administrative District 30), and Lee Academy (a private school paid by MSAD 30 to educate high school students).
