= Centerville, Maine =

- Township
- Interactive map of Centerville, Maine
- Coordinates: 44°42′26″N 67°39′13″W
- Country: United States
- State: Maine
- County: Washington

Area
  - Total: 43.0 sq mi (111.3 km^{2})
  - Land: 41.9 sq mi (108.6 km^{2})
  - Water: 1.0 sq mi (2.7 km^{2})
- Elevation: 105 ft (32 m)

Population (2000)
  - Total: 26
  - Density: 0.52/sq mi (0.2/km^{2})
- Time zone: UTC-5 (Eastern (EST))
  - Summer (DST): UTC-4 (EDT)
- ZIP code: 04623
- Area code: 207
- FIPS code: 23-11755
- GNIS feature ID: 0582399

Centerville is a township in Washington County, Maine, in the United States. As of the 2000 census, the town population was 26.

As of 2003, the town meeting voted to dissolve the town government and return it to unincorporated territory; the disincorporation was effective as of July 1, 2004. The former town is now included in the North Washington Unorganized Territory.

== History ==
Prior to de-organization, residents were facing exhaustion with the task of running a municipality, and they found a decreasing number of qualified, interested people in holding such positions.

== Geography ==
According to the United States Census Bureau, the town had a total area of 111.3 km^{2} (43.0 sq mi). 108.6 km^{2} (41.9 sq mi) of it is land and 2.7 km^{2} (1.0 sq mi) of it (2.47%) is water.

== Demographics ==
As of the census of 2000, there were 26 people, 12 households, and 6 families residing in the town. The population density was 0.2 people/km^{2} (0.52 people/mi^{2}). There were 24 housing units at an average density of 0.2 units/km^{2} (0.52 units/mi^{2}). The racial makeup of the town was 100.00% White.

There were 12 households, out of which 25.0% had children under the age of 18 living with them, 50.0% were married couples living together, 8.3% had a female householder with no husband present, and 41.7% were non-families. 41.7% of all households were made up of individuals, and none had someone living alone who was 65 years of age or older. The average household size was 2.17 and the average family size was 2.71.

In the town, the population was spread out, with 23.1% under the age of 18, 30.8% from 25 to 44, 38.5% from 45 to 64, and 7.7% who were 65 years of age or older. The median age was 44 years. For every 100 females, there were 85.7 males. For every 100 females age 18 and over, there were 100.0 males.

The median income for a household in the town was $26,458, and the median income for a family was $27,500. Males had a median income of $16,250 versus $18,750 for females. The per capita income for the town was $19,958. None of the population and none of the families were below the poverty line.

== Education ==
The Maine Department of Education takes responsibility for coordinating school assignments in the unorganized territories. The state assigns Centerville to the Maine School Administrative District 37: Schools include Harrington Elementary, DW Merritt School, Milbridge Elementary School, and Narraguagus High School.
