= Prentiss, Maine =

- Unorganized territory
- Location within Maine Location within the United States
- Coordinates: 45°29′30″N 68°04′54″W
- Country: United States
- State: Maine
- County: Penobscot

Area
  - Total: 38.4 sq mi (99.4 km^{2})
  - Land: 38.3 sq mi (99.3 km^{2})
  - Water: 0.039 sq mi (0.1 km^{2})
- Elevation: 660 ft (200 m)

Population (2020)
  - Total: 169
  - Density: 4.41/sq mi (1.70/km^{2})
- Time zone: UTC-5 (Eastern (EST))
  - Summer (DST): UTC-4 (EDT)
- ZIP code: 04487
- Area code: 207
- FIPS code: 23-60790
- GNIS feature ID: 2378265

Prentiss is an unorganized territory (township) in Penobscot County, Maine, United States. The township was named for Henry Prentiss, an early landowner. The population was 169 at the 2020 census.

== Geography ==
According to the United States Census Bureau, the unorganized territory has a total area of 38.4 square miles (99.4 km^{2}), of which 38.3 square miles (99.3 km^{2}) is land and 0.04 square miles (0.1 km^{2}), or 0.10%, is water.

== Demographics ==
Historical population
Census	Pop.	Note	%±
1860	226		—
1870	387		71.2%
1880	416		7.5%
1890	401		−3.6%
1900	502		25.2%
1910	472		−6.0%
1920	373		−21.0%
1930	330		−11.5%
1940	337		2.1%
1950	315		−6.5%
1960	227		−27.9%
1970	159		−30.0%
1980	205		28.9%
1990	245		19.5%
2000	214		−12.7%
2010	214		0.0%
2020	169		−21.0%
U.S. Decennial Census

As of the census of 2000, there were 214 people, 82 households, and 61 families living in the unorganized territory. The population density was 5.6 inhabitants per square mile (2.2/km^{2}). There were 113 housing units at an average density of 2.9 per square mile (1.1/km^{2}). The racial makeup of the unorganized territory was 97.66% White, 0.47% Black or African American, 1.40% Native American, and 0.47% from two or more races. Hispanic or Latino of any race were 1.40% of the population.

There were 82 households, out of which 35.4% had children under the age of 18 living with them, 62.2% were married couples living together, 4.9% had a female householder with no husband present, and 24.4% were non-families. 18.3% of all households were made up of individuals, and 4.9% had someone living alone who was 65 years of age or older. The average household size was 2.61 and the average family size was 2.95.

In the unorganized territory the population was spread out, with 25.7% under the age of 18, 7.5% from 18 to 24, 29.0% from 25 to 44, 24.3% from 45 to 64, and 13.6% who were 65 years of age or older. The median age was 39 years. For every 100 females, there were 122.9 males. For every 100 females age 18 and over, there were 112.0 males.

The median income for a household in the unorganized territory was $15,938, and the median income for a family was $21,250. Males had a median income of $28,750 versus $18,750 for females. The per capita income for the unorganized territory was $8,809. About 30.0% of families and 32.9% of the population were below the poverty line, including 27.9% of those under the age of 18 and 46.2% of those 65 or over.

== Education ==
The Maine Department of Education takes responsibility for coordinating school assignments in the unorganized territories. As of 2025 it assigns Prentiss to: Kingman Elementary School (a school in the unorganized territory operated by the Maine Department of Education), Mt. Jefferson Junior High School (of Maine School Administrative District 30), and Lee Academy (a private school paid by the state).
