= Perkins Township =

Perkins Township may be either of the following places in the United States:

- Perkins Township, Maine
- Perkins Township, Erie County, Ohio
