= Criehaven, Maine =

Criehaven, Maine Ragged Island
- Unorganized territory
- Location within the state of Maine
- Coordinates: 43°50′02″N 68°53′21″W
- Country: United States
- State: Maine
- County: Knox

Area
  - Total: 131.8 sq mi (341.3 km^{2})
  - Land: 0.73 sq mi (1.9 km^{2})
  - Water: 131.1 sq mi (339.5 km^{2})

Population (2020)
  - Total: 4
- Time zone: UTC-5 (Eastern (EST))
  - Summer (DST): UTC-4 (EDT)
- Area code: 207
- FIPS code: 23-15125
- GNIS feature ID: 2378260

Criehaven is an alternative name for Ragged Island, an unorganized territory in Knox County, Maine, United States. Criehaven was formerly a plantation including Ragged Island just south of Matinicus Isle in outer Penobscot Bay, plus Matinicus Rock to its southeast, and Seal Island, the location of Seal Island National Wildlife Refuge, to its northeast. Criehaven surrendered its organization and reverted to an unorganized territory in 1925, but the name persists.

== History ==
Criehaven is pronounced "cree-haven", after Robert Crie (1826–1901), an early landowner. He and his wife, Harriet Hall (1829–1919), moved in 1849 to Ragged Island, where Robert became successful in farming and lumbering. Island chronicler Charles McLane wrote that in 1879, Robert owned the whole island, and in 1896, all of their five children with their wives and husbands and children lived there, too. He incorporated Ragged Island as the plantation of Criehaven in that year, and for the next few decades it was a thriving small community. In addition to fishing, sheep raising, and farming, Mr. Crie for many years kept a general store at Criehaven. McLane asserts that after Crie's death, the "vigor of the community was gradually drained by natural disasters and changing times."

With its population dwindling, Criehaven plantation dissolved in 1925 to revert to a 'wild land' obviating the need for town meetings and further taxation. The school continued to operate until 1941. After the school's closing, the accelerating departure of year-round families cost the island its general store and post office as well. A "lively summer community of fishermen and vacationers" continues to occupy Ragged Island according to McLane, but there has "rarely been year round habitation in recent years."

Ragged Island on early charts in 1754, 1776, and 1819 is shown as "Ragged Arse Island". McLane asserts the name "Ragged Arse Island" might have been an attempt to render "Racketash", Abnaki for "island rocks". Charts in the mid-19th century began calling it Ragged Island but, McLane asserts, the Matinicus lobstermen continue calling the island Ragged Arse "out of perversity". Ragged Island dubs itself the "Island of Lobsters", and boasts of being the farthest offshore inhabited island on the East Coast.

The island is the former home of writer Elisabeth Ogilvie and the inspiration for her "Tide Trilogy." Writer Dorothy Simpson lived on Criehaven for many years. A fictionalized version of Criehaven is the setting for the web series "Ragged Isle."

== Geography ==
According to the United States Census Bureau, the location has a total area of 131.8 square miles (341.3 km^{2}), of which 0.7 square mile (1.9 km^{2}) is land and 131.1 square miles (339.5 km^{2}) (99.46%) is water.

== Demographics ==
Historical population
Census	Pop.	Note	%±
1900	47		—
1910	46		−2.1%
1920	63		37.0%
2010	1		—
2020	4		300.0%
U.S. Decennial Census

As of the 2010 Census, there was one person living in the location. There are people who have houses on Ragged Island and some stay all summer and some people stay just part of every week. Seasonally there are ten lobster-fishing families and ten non-fishing families.

== Education ==
The Maine Department of Education takes responsibility for coordinating school assignments in the unorganized territories.

== See also ==
- List of islands of Maine
