= Whitney, Maine =

- Unorganized territory
- Location within Maine Location within the United States
- Coordinates: 45°18′01″N 67°58′51″W
- Country: United States
- State: Maine
- County: Penobscot

Area
  - Total: 18.1 sq mi (46.9 km^{2})
  - Land: 10.9 sq mi (28.3 km^{2})
  - Water: 7.2 sq mi (18.6 km^{2})
- Elevation: 341 ft (104 m)

Population (2020)
  - Total: 6
  - Density: 0.55/sq mi (0.21/km^{2})
- Time zone: UTC-5 (Eastern (EST))
  - Summer (DST): UTC-4 (EDT)
- ZIP Code: 04487 (Springfield)
- Area code: 207
- FIPS code: 23-85230
- GNIS feature ID: 582813

Whitney is an unorganized territory in Penobscot County, Maine, United States. It is designated as Township 5 Range 1 of the North of Bingham's Penobscot Purchase. The population was 6 at the 2020 census. T5 R1 NBPP is also known as Pukakon Township.

== Geography ==
According to the United States Census Bureau, Whitney has a total area of 18.1 square miles (46.9 km^{2}), of which 10.9 square miles (28.3 km^{2}) is land and 7.2 square miles (18.6 km^{2}), or 39.74%, is water. Much of the area of the township is occupied by several lakes at the headwaters of the West Branch of the St. Croix River, including Scraggly Lake and Junior Lake.

== Demographics ==
Historical population
| Census | Pop. | Note | %± |
|---|---|---|---|
| 2010 | 5 | | — |
| 2020 | 6 | | 20.0% |
U.S. Decennial Census

As of the 2020 Census, there were six people living in the location.

== Education ==
The Maine Department of Education takes responsibility for coordinating school assignments in the unorganized territories. Pukakon Township is assigned to: Kingman Elementary School (a school in the unorganized territory operated by the Maine Department of Education), Mt. Jefferson Junior High School (of Maine School Administrative District 30), and Lee Academy (a private school paid by the state).
