= Muscle Ridge Islands, Maine =

- Unorganized territory
- Location in Knox County and the state of Maine.
- Coordinates: 44°2′31″N 69°2′19″W
- Country: United States
- State: Maine
- County: Knox

Area
  - Total: 49.7 sq mi (128.6 km^{2})
  - Land: 0.95 sq mi (2.45 km^{2})
  - Water: 48.7 sq mi (126.2 km^{2})

Population (2020)
  - Total: 9
- Time zone: UTC-5 (Eastern (EST))
  - Summer (DST): UTC-4 (EDT)
- ZIP Code: 04854 (Owls Head)
- Area code: 207
- FIPS code: 23-47962
- GNIS feature ID: 1934678

Muscle Ridge Islands is an archipelago and unorganized territory off the coast of South Thomaston in Knox County, Maine, United States. The population was 9 at the 2020 census.

== Geography ==
According to the United States Census Bureau, the unorganized territory has a total area of 49.7 square miles (128.6 km^{2}), of which 0.95 square miles (2.45 km^{2}) is land and 48.7 square miles (126.2 km^{2}) is water (98%). The archipelago includes over a dozen islands, including Andrews, Dix, Fisherman, Pleasant, Graffam, and Two Bush Island, which is home to the Two Bush Island Light.

== Education ==
The Maine Department of Education takes responsibility for coordinating school assignments in the unorganized territories.
