= Drew, Maine =

- Township
- Location within Maine Location within the United States
- Coordinates: 45°35′N 68°06′W
- Country: United States
- State: Maine
- County: Penobscot

Area
  - Total: 39.1 sq mi (101.3 km^{2})
  - Land: 38.0 sq mi (98.5 km^{2})
  - Water: 1.1 sq mi (2.8 km^{2})
- Elevation: 318 ft (97 m)

Population (2020)
  - Total: 26
  - Density: 0.68/sq mi (0.26/km^{2})
- Time zone: UTC-5 (Eastern (EST))
  - Summer (DST): UTC-4 (EDT)
- ZIP Codes: 04497 (Wytopitlock); 04451 (Kingman)
- Area code: 207
- FIPS code: 23-18580
- GNIS feature ID: 0582447

Drew is a township in Penobscot County, Maine, United States. The population was 26 at the 2020 census. It is part of the Bangor Metropolitan Statistical Area. The Surety of Sinners Orthodox Mission, a Russian Orthodox church, is located in Drew. A former plantation, Drew completed the de-organization process in 2023 to become part of Maine's unorganized territory.

== Geography ==
According to the United States Census Bureau, the plantation has a total area of 39.1 square miles (101.3 km^{2}), of which 38.0 square miles (98.5 km^{2}) is land and 1.1 square miles (2.8 km^{2}), or 2.75%, is water. The Mattawamkeag River flows through the plantation.

== Demographics ==
Historical population
Census	Pop.	Note	%±
1870	85		—
1880	137		61.2%
1890	110		−19.7%
1900	120		9.1%
1910	247		105.8%
1920	286		15.8%
1930	110		−61.5%
1940	93		−15.5%
1950	72		−22.6%
1960	43		−40.3%
1970	32		−25.6%
1980	57		78.1%
1990	43		−24.6%
2000	57		32.6%
2010	46		−19.3%
2020	26		−43.5%
U.S. Decennial Census

At the 2000 census there were 57 people in 17 households, including 12 families, in the plantation. The population density was 1.5 people per square mile (0.6/km^{2}). There were 37 housing units at an average density of 1.0 per square mile (0.4/km^{2}). The racial makeup of the plantation was 91.23% White, 5.26% African American, and 3.51% from two or more races. Of the 17 households 35.3% had children under the age of 18 living with them, 70.6% were married couples living together, and 29.4% were non-families. 23.5% of households were one person and 23.5% were one person aged 65 or older. The average household size was 3.35 and the average family size was 4.00.

The age distribution was 33.3% under the age of 18, 5.3% from 18 to 24, 28.1% from 25 to 44, 17.5% from 45 to 64, and 15.8% 65 or older. The median age was 35 years. For every 100 females, there were 119.2 males. For every 100 females age 18 and over, there were 90.0 males.

The median household income was $26,667 and the median family income was $43,125. Males had a median income of $32,500 versus $100,000 for females. The per capita income for the plantation was $15,249. There were no families and 3.1% of the population living below the poverty line, including no under eighteens and none of those over 64.

== Education ==
The Maine Department of Education takes responsibility for coordinating school assignments in the unorganized territory. As of 2025 it assigns Drew to Kingman Elementary School (a school in the unorganized territory operated by the Maine Department of Education), Mt. Jefferson Junior High School (of Maine School Administrative District 30), and Lee Academy (a private school paid by the state).

When Drew was a plantation, it was in Maine School Administrative District 30, which also operates an elementary school in Winn, and which sends all of its students to Lee Academy.
