= Lakeville =

Lakeville may refer to:

== Canada ==
- Lakeville, a local service district north of Woodstock, New Brunswick
  - Lakeville, Carleton County, New Brunswick, a community within the local service district
- Lakeville, Westmorland County, New Brunswick, a community near Moncton
- Lakeville, Nova Scotia

== United States ==
- Lakeville, California
- Cartago, California, formerly Lakeville, California
- Lakeville, Connecticut
- Lakeville, Indiana
- Lakeville, Maine
- Lakeville, Massachusetts
- Lakeville, Minnesota
- Lakeville, New York
- Lakeville, Ohio
- Lakeville, Pennsylvania
