= Romanzo Kingman House =

Historic house in Maine, United States

- Formerly listed on the U.S. National Register of Historic Places
- Location within Maine Location within the United States
- Location: Main St., Kingman, Maine
- Coordinates: 45°32′57″N 68°11′58″W
- Area: 0.3 acres (0.12 ha)
- Built: 1871
- Architectural style: Italianate
- NRHP reference No.: 82000775

Significant dates
- Added to NRHP: February 19, 1982
- Removed from NRHP: November 25, 2020

The Romanzo Kingman House was a historic house on Main Street (Maine State Route 170) in Kingman, Maine. Built in 1871, it was the unincorporated community's most sophisticated example of 19th-century architecture. It was built for Romanzo Kingman, the area's namesake and owner of a locally important tannery. The house was listed on the National Register of Historic Places in 1982. It was destroyed by fire about 2005, and was delisted in 2020.

== Description and history ==
The Kingman House was located on Main Street in the rural town center of Kingman, an unincorporated community in southeastern Penobscot County. It was two stories in height, with a hip roof, central chimney, and clapboard siding. Its main facade, facing southwest, was three bays wide, with the entrance in the left bay, sheltered by a portico support by square posts and pilasters. It had a denticulated cornice and a low balustrade on the sides. First floor windows were crowned by gabled pediments with consoles, while the second floor windows had flat pediments with consoles. A two-story ell extended northeast from the main block, joining the house to a carriage barn.

Romanzo Kingman and his brother-in-law, Fayette Shaw, established a tannery in Kingman in the 1860s, which was billed for a time as one of the largest in the nation. The tannery was a major local industry until it was destroyed in a massive explosion in the 1920s. Kingman and Shaw, both bachelors at the time, built this house, the only house of architectural distinction in the small community, in 1871–72. Kingman left the area a few years later to open a second tannery in Wisconsin; when the community incorporated as a plantation, it was named in his honor. His home was destroyed by fire about 2005.

== See also ==
- National Register of Historic Places listings in Penobscot County, Maine
