= Marshall Island, Maine =

- Unorganized territory
- Location within Maine Location within the United States
- Coordinates: 44°06′47″N 68°29′42″W
- Country: United States
- State: Maine
- County: Hancock

Area
  - Total: 5.4 sq mi (14.1 km^{2})
  - Land: 1.6 sq mi (4.1 km^{2})
  - Water: 3.9 sq mi (10.1 km^{2})
- Elevation: 46 ft (14 m)

Population (2020)
  - Total: 0
- Time zone: UTC-5 (Eastern (EST))
  - Summer (DST): UTC-4 (EDT)
- Area code: 207
- FIPS code: 23-43578
- GNIS feature ID: 2378263

Marshall Island is an island and unorganized territory in Hancock County, Maine, United States. It lies where Penobscot Bay and Blue Hill Bay meet, between Swan's Island and Isle au Haut. Uninhabited, it is one of the largest undeveloped islands surrounding the contiguous United States.

== History ==
Development of the island was explored in the 1980s, with wells drilled for 14 potential properties, but these plans fell through due to a weak real estate market. The island was purchased in three parcels by the Maine Coast Heritage Trust in 2003 and 2004 for a total cost of $6.3 million.

== Geography ==
According to the United States Census Bureau, the unorganized territory has a total area of 5.5 square miles (14.1 km^{2}), of which 1.6 square miles (4.1 km^{2}) is land and 3.9 square miles (10.1 km^{2}) is water (71%).

Covering 985 acres, Marshall Island is the 11th largest island in Maine. It is almost entirely forested, apart from a pair of discontinued runways. While it has a primarily rocky coast, it also has more than ten beaches, the largest of which is located on the southeastern side of the island in Sand Cove.

== Activities ==
Maine Coast Heritage Trust has turned the island into Ed Woodsum Preserve, which is open to the public. The land trust has campsites available on the island, and maintains hiking trails that surround and cross the island. It also advertises the island as an ideal location for boating, birdwatching and swimming at its sandy beaches. The island is also open to hunting and fishing.

== Education ==
The Maine Department of Education is responsible for school assignments in unorganized territories.
