= Matinicus Rock Light =

Lighthouse in Maine, US

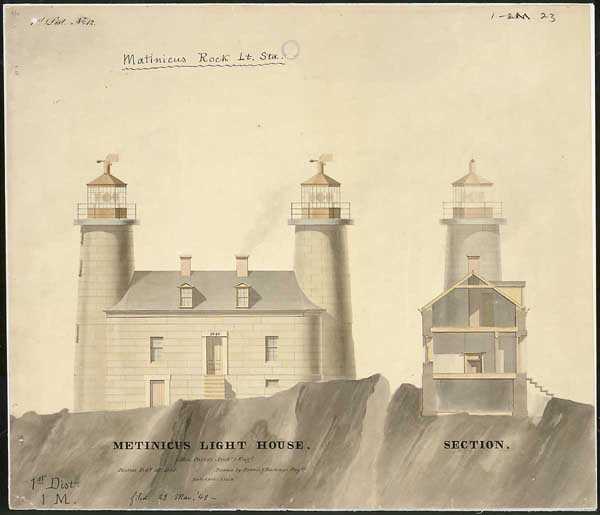
- Matinicus Lighthouse, drawn in March 1848
- Location: 6 miles south of Matinicus Island, Town of Criehaven, Maine
- Coordinates: 43°47′.502″N 68°51′18.119″W

Tower
- Constructed: 1827
- Foundation: Natural emplaced
- Construction: Granite blocks
- Automated: 1983
- Height: 14.5 m (48 ft)
- Shape: Cylindrical twin towers
- Markings: Natural
- Power source: solar cell
- Heritage: National Register of Historic Places listed place
- Fog signal: HORN: 1 every 15s, operates continuously.

Light
- First lit: 1846 (current tower)
- Focal height: 90 feet (27 m)
- Lens: Third order Fresnel lens (original), VRB-25 (current)
- Range: 20 nautical miles (37 km; 23 mi)
- Characteristic: Flashing white 10s
- Matinicus Rock Light Station
- U.S. National Register of Historic Places
- U.S. Historic district
- Nearest city: Matinicus Isle, Maine
- Built: 1847
- Architect: US Army Corps of Engineers; Alexander Parris
- MPS: Light Stations of Maine MPS
- NRHP reference No.: 88000149
- Added to NRHP: March 14, 1988

Matinicus Rock Light is a lighthouse on Matinicus Rock, a windswept rock 25 miles (40 km) off the coast of Maine. It is one of eleven seacoast lights off the coast of Maine. First established in 1827, the present surviving structures date to 1857. The lighthouse was added to the National Register of Historic Places as Matinicus Rock Light Station on March 14, 1988.

== Description ==
Matinicus Rock is a windswept and treeless rock, projecting out of the Gulf of Maine several miles south of the main islands of Matinicus Isle, Maine, an island community that is a 20-mile (32 km) ferry ride from Rockland. The light station occupies the center of the rock, and includes two towers, a keeper's house, shed, and boathouse. The dock is located on the northwest side of the rock. The two towers are 41 feet (12 m) in height, built out of ashlar granite stone. Only the southern one is active, and has a twelve-sided lantern house, while the other has lost its lantern house. Connected to the active tower is the keeper's house, a single-story frame structure whose end walls are semicircular granite structures, remnants of the older lighthouses.

== History ==
In 1827 the United States Lighthouse Service erected a pair of wooden light towers and a cobblestone keeper's residence on Matinicus Rock. The lights guided sea traffic until 1848 when they were replaced by the granite structure (see picture). In 1857 the government rebuilt the towers and placed them 180 feet (55 m) apart to make them more effective; the north light was deactivated in 1924. Alexander Parris, the architect who designed the 1848 lighthouses, also designed many stone buildings in New England including the 1825 Quincy Market in Boston, Massachusetts.

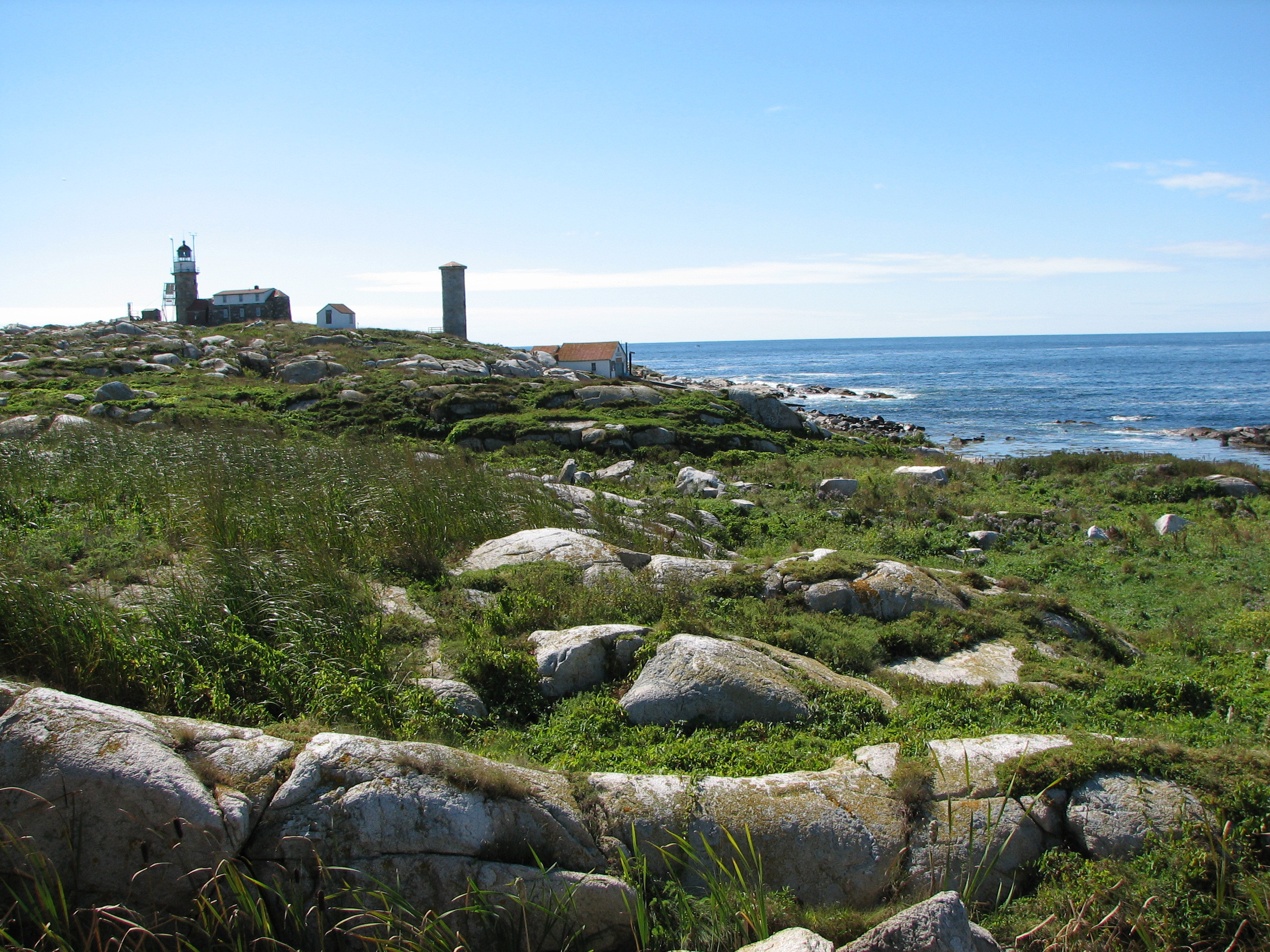
2006 US FWS photo

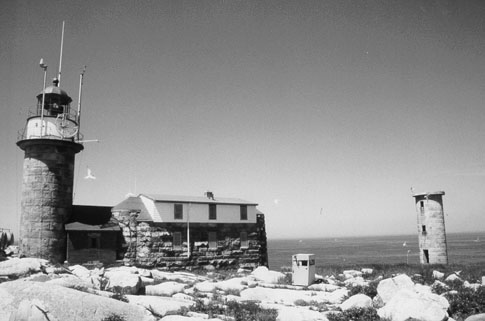
US Coast Guard photo c. 1980

Matinicus Light is famous for the story of Abbie Burgess, who as a young girl maintained the light for several weeks while her father, the lighthouse keeper, was on the mainland. Winter storms prevented his timely return. Her mother was also very sick.

Matinicus Rock is now fully automated. A diesel generator used for power was replaced by solar panels in 2007. Matinicus Rock is known as being the southernmost nesting site for the Atlantic puffin and as of 2009, the common murre. The Audubon Society often has observers on island during nesting season.

== See also ==
- National Register of Historic Places listings in Knox County, Maine
