= Northwest Hancock, Maine =

- Unorganized territory
- Location within Maine Location within the United States
- Coordinates: 44°57′11″N 68°25′37″W
- Country: United States
- State: Maine
- County: Hancock

Area
  - Total: 41.4 sq mi (107.3 km^{2})
  - Land: 41.4 sq mi (107.1 km^{2})
  - Water: 0.077 sq mi (0.2 km^{2})
- Elevation: 259 ft (79 m)

Population (2020)
  - Total: 2
  - Density: 0.048/sq mi (0.019/km^{2})
- Time zone: UTC-5 (Eastern (EST))
  - Summer (DST): UTC-4 (EDT)
- ZIP Code: 04408 (Aurora)
- Area code: 207
- FIPS code: 23-53620
- GNIS feature ID: 582639

Northwest Hancock is an unorganized territory (township) in Hancock County, Maine, United States. The population was 2 at the 2020 census. The territory is designated as Township 32 Middle Division.

== Geography ==
According to the United States Census Bureau, the unorganized territory has a total area of 41.4 square miles (107.3 km^{2}), of which 41.3 square miles (107.1 km^{2}) is land and 0.1 square mile (0.2 km^{2}) is water (0.22%).

== Demographics ==
Historical population
| Census | Pop. | Note | %± |
|---|---|---|---|
| 2000 | 4 | | — |
| 2010 | 2 | | −50.0% |
| 2020 | 2 | | 0.0% |
U.S. Decennial Census

As of the census of 2000.there were 4 people, 2 households, and 1 family residing in the unorganized territory. The population density was 0.1 inhabitants per square mile (0.039/km^{2}). There were 20 housing units at an average density of 0.5 per square mile (0.19/km^{2}). The racial makeup of the unorganized territory was 100.00% White.

There were 2 households, out of which 1 was a married couple living together, and 1 was a non-family. No households were made up of individuals, and none had someone living alone who was 65 years of age or older. The average household size was 2 and the average family size was 2.

All of the inhabitants were 45 to 64 years old. The median age was 50 years. For every 100 females, there were 100 males. For every 100 females age 18 and over there were 100 males.

== Education ==
The Maine Department of Education is responsible for school assignments in unorganized territories.
