= Winn, Maine =

Town in Maine, United States

- Town
- Logo

- Location within Maine Location within the United States
- Coordinates: 45°27′20″N 68°19′45″W
- Country: United States
- State: Maine
- County: Penobscot

Area
  - Total: 43.84 sq mi (113.55 km^{2})
  - Land: 43.70 sq mi (113.18 km^{2})
  - Water: 0.14 sq mi (0.36 km^{2})
- Elevation: 266 ft (81 m)

Population (2020)
  - Total: 399
  - Density: 9.1/sq mi (3.5/km^{2})
- Time zone: UTC-5 (Eastern (EST))
  - Summer (DST): UTC-4 (EDT)
- ZIP code: 04495
- Area code: 207
- FIPS code: 23-86305
- GNIS feature ID: 582819
- Website: townofwinn.org

Winn is a town in Penobscot County, Maine, United States, on the east bank of the Penobscot River. The town was named for John M. Winn, an early landholder. The population was 399 at the 2020 census.

== History ==
Henry Poor & Son, a large leather firm in Boston, owned a tannery in Winn which burned down in 1892, bankrupting the company.

== Geography ==
According to the United States Census Bureau, the town has a total area of 43.84 square miles (113.55 km^{2}), of which 43.70 square miles (113.18 km^{2}) is land and 0.14 square miles (0.36 km^{2}) is water.

== Demographics ==
Historical population
Census	Pop.	Note	%±
1830	43		—
1860	853		—
1870	714		−16.3%
1880	898		25.8%
1890	936		4.2%
1900	688		−26.5%
1910	655		−4.8%
1920	638		−2.6%
1930	560		−12.2%
1940	585		4.5%
1950	497		−15.0%
1960	526		5.8%
1970	516		−1.9%
1980	503		−2.5%
1990	479		−4.8%
2000	420		−12.3%
2010	407		−3.1%
2020	399		−2.0%
U.S. Decennial Census

=== 2010 census ===
As of the census of 2010, there were 407 people, 175 households, and 122 families living in the town. The population density was 9.3 inhabitants per square mile (3.6/km^{2}). There were 210 housing units at an average density of 4.8 per square mile (1.9/km^{2}). The racial makeup of the town was 98.3% White, 0.2% African American, and 1.5% from two or more races. Hispanic or Latino of any race were 0.2% of the population.

There were 175 households, of which 26.3% had children under the age of 18 living with them, 56.6% were married couples living together, 7.4% had a female householder with no husband present, 5.7% had a male householder with no wife present, and 30.3% were non-families. 22.9% of all households were made up of individuals, and 9.2% had someone living alone who was 65 years of age or older. The average household size was 2.33 and the average family size was 2.67.

The median age in the town was 46.4 years. 19.4% of residents were under the age of 18; 8.2% were between the ages of 18 and 24; 20.8% were from 25 to 44; 32% were from 45 to 64; and 19.7% were 65 years of age or older. The gender makeup of the town was 50.6% male and 49.4% female.

=== 2000 census ===
As of the census of 2000, there were 420 people, 170 households, and 133 families living in the town. The population density was 9.5 people per square mile (3.7/km^{2}). There were 193 housing units at an average density of 4.4 per square mile (1.7/km^{2}). The racial makeup of the town was 98.81% White, 0.24% Native American, 0.48% from other races, and 0.48% from two or more races. Hispanic or Latino of any race were 0.71% of the population.

There were 170 households, out of which 23.5% had children under the age of 18 living with them, 67.1% were married couples living together, 7.6% had a female householder with no husband present, and 21.2% were non-families. 18.8% of all households were made up of individuals, and 9.4% had someone living alone who was 65 years of age or older. The average household size was 2.47 and the average family size was 2.75.

In the town, the population was spread out, with 21.7% under the age of 18, 4.8% from 18 to 24, 25.7% from 25 to 44, 27.1% from 45 to 64, and 20.7% who were 65 years of age or older. The median age was 44 years. For every 100 females, there were 102.9 males. For every 100 females age 18 and over, there were 101.8 males.

The median income for a household in the town was $28,409, and the median income for a family was $33,393. Males had a median income of $27,500 versus $25,000 for females. The per capita income for the town was $14,792. About 12.3% of families and 12.8% of the population were below the poverty line, including 14.6% of those under age 18 and 15.1% of those age 65 or over.

== Education ==
It is in Maine School Administrative District 30. It operates Lee/Winn Elementary School in Winn and Mount Jefferson Junior High School in Lee. MASD 30 does not operate a high school, but instead pays Lee Academy in Lee to educate its students at the high school level.
