= Argyle, Maine =

- Unorganized territory
- Location within Maine Location within the United States
- Coordinates: 45°05′15″N 68°40′32″W
- Country: United States
- State: Maine
- County: Penobscot

Area
  - Total: 26.7 sq mi (69.2 km^{2})
  - Land: 26.7 sq mi (69.2 km^{2})
  - Water: 0 sq mi (0 km^{2})
- Elevation: 194 ft (59 m)

Population (2020)
  - Total: 255
  - Density: 9.54/sq mi (3.68/km^{2})
- Time zone: UTC-5 (Eastern (EST))
  - Summer (DST): UTC-4 (EDT)
- ZIP code: 04468
- Area code: 207
- FIPS code: 23-01500
- GNIS feature ID: 2378257

Argyle is an unorganized territory (township) in Penobscot County, Maine, United States. The population was 255 at the 2020 census.

== Geography ==
According to the United States Census Bureau, the unorganized territory has a total area of 26.7 square miles (69.2 km^{2}), all land. It is located by the Penobscot River, to the north of Orono and Old Town.

== Demographics ==
Historical population
Census	Pop.	Note	%±
1830	326		—
1840	527		61.7%
1850	338		−35.9%
1860	379		12.1%
1870	307		−19.0%
1880	285		−7.2%
1890	263		−7.7%
1900	320		21.7%
1910	233		−27.2%
1920	170		−27.0%
1930	120		−29.4%
1940	128		6.7%
1950	133		3.9%
1960	128		−3.8%
1970	155		21.1%
1980	225		45.2%
1990	202		−10.2%
2000	253		25.2%
2010	277		9.5%
2020	255		−7.9%
U.S. Decennial Census

As of the census of 2000, there were 253 people, 95 households, and 64 families residing in the unorganized territory. The population density was 9.5 inhabitants per square mile (3.7/km^{2}). There were 124 housing units at an average density of 4.6 per square mile (1.8/km^{2}). The racial makeup of the unorganized territory was 95.65% White, 3.95% Native American and 0.40% Asian.

There were 95 households, out of which 33.7% had children under the age of 18 living with them, 58.9% were married couples living together, 4.2% had a female householder with no husband present, and 32.6% were non-families. 23.2% of all households were made up of individuals, and 4.2% had someone living alone who was 65 years of age or older. The average household size was 2.66 and the average family size was 3.19.

In the unorganized territory the population was spread out, with 26.1% under the age of 18, 11.9% from 18 to 24, 30.0% from 25 to 44, 22.5% from 45 to 64, and 9.5% who were 65 years of age or older. The median age was 34 years. For every 100 females, there were 102.4 males. For every 100 females age 18 and over, there were 105.5 males.

The median income for a household in the unorganized territory was $35,714, and the median income for a family was $43,750. Males had a median income of $27,250 versus $28,750 for females. The per capita income for the unorganized territory was $14,359. About 5.0% of families and 8.1% of the population were below the poverty line, including 4.3% of those under the age of eighteen and 29.4% of those 65 or over.

== Education ==
The Maine Department of Education takes responsibility for coordinating school assignments in the unorganized territory. As of 2025 it assigns Argyle to Regional School Unit 34.

== Notable people ==
- Solomon Gilman Comstock (1842-1933); was born in Argyle and moved to Minnesota, where he became a U.S. congressman (1889–91).
- Philip Foster (1805-1884), noteworthy early pioneer of Oregon.
