= Daegu International School =

International school in Daegu, South Korea

Coordinates: 35.92038°N 128.64432°E

- Korean: 대구국제학교

Information
- Established: 13 August 2010; 15 years ago
- Sister school: Lee Academy
- Grades: K-12
- Language: English
- Affiliation: South Korean Association of International Schools

Daegu International School (DIS; Korean: 대구국제학교) is an international school in Dong-gu, Daegu, South Korea. It was established on August 13, 2010, and serves Kindergarten through grade 12.

It is a joint venture between the City of Daegu and Lee Academy, an American private school in Lee, Maine.

Daegu International School provides a U.S. curriculum taught entirely in English to students in grades K-12. Daegu International School is fully licensed by the Ministry of Education, Republic of Korea and is recognized by the Department of Education, Maine, USA as an associated school of Lee Academy (Lee, Maine, USA). DIS is accredited by the Western Association of Schools and Colleges (WASC). DIS offers a rigorous program based on the Common Core State Standards, Maine Learning Results, and Advanced Placement courses of the College Board. DIS provides an education to students from 15 countries. The DIS goal is to prepare all students academically, socially, and emotionally to enter post-secondary education in the finest universities and colleges in the US and worldwide. Students are strongly encouraged to be involved in all aspects of DIS life. A variety of athletic teams and a plethora of after-school activities are provided for students to join.

Daegu International School is a part of the South Korean Association of International Schools (SKAIS) with Atherton International School, Busan Foreign School, Gyeongnam International Foreign School, Hyundai Foreign School, and International School of Busan. Daegu International School also participates in the invitational Korea International School Activities Conference hosted on Jeju Island.
