= Brookton, Maine =

- Village
- Location within Maine
- Coordinates: 45°31′47″N 67°45′56″W
- Country: United States
- State: Maine
- County: Washington
- Elevation: 449 ft (137 m)
- Time zone: UTC-5 (Eastern (EST))
  - Summer (DST): UTC-4 (EDT)
- ZIP code: 04413
- Area code: 207
- GNIS feature ID: 563022

Brookton is an unincorporated village in Washington County, Maine, United States. It lies within the North Washington unorganized area and is not part of any township. The community is located along U.S. Route 1, 33.5 miles (53.9 km) northwest of Calais. Brookton has a post office, with ZIP code 04413.

== Education ==
The Maine Department of Education takes responsibility for coordinating school assignments in the unorganized territories. As of 2025 it lists three schools for Brookton: East Grand School, a Pre-Kindergarten to Grade 12 school in Danforth, East Range II CSD School, a Pre-Kindergarten to grade 8 in Topsfield (of the Eastern Maine Area School System Alternative Organizational Structure 90), and Lee Academy, a private school in Lee.

Previously the Maine Department of Education operated an elementary school in Brookton. Brookton Elementary School closed in 1995, and a community center moved into the building.
