= Matinicus Isle, Maine =

Matinicus Island, Maine
- Plantation
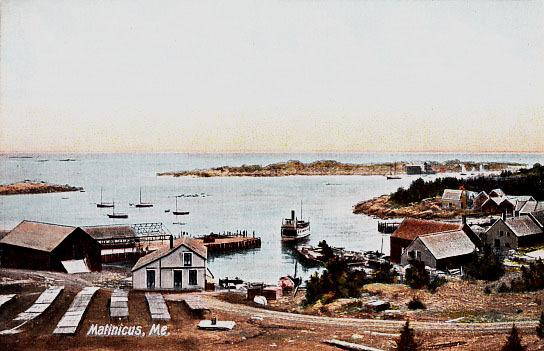
- View of the harbor c. 1908

- Logo

- Location in Knox County and the state of Maine.
- Coordinates: 43°53′48″N 69°03′49″W
- Country: United States
- State: Maine
- County: Knox
- Organized: 1840

Area
  - Total: 10 sq mi (26 km^{2})
  - Land: 2.3 sq mi (6 km^{2})
  - Water: 7.7 sq mi (20 km^{2})
- Elevation: 0 ft (0 m)

Population (2020)
  - Total: 53
  - Density: 23/sq mi (8.8/km^{2})
- Time zone: UTC-5 (Eastern (EST))
  - Summer (DST): UTC-4 (EDT)
- Zip code: 04851
- Area code: 207
- FIPS code: 23-44165
- GNIS feature ID: 582584
- Website: matinicusplantation.com

Matinicus Isle is an island plantation in Knox County, Maine, United States. The island is located within Penobscot Bay approximately 20 miles (32 km) east of the mainland coast and is accessible by state ferry service from Rockland or by air taxi from Knox County Regional Airport. The plantation is both a year-round island community and a summer colony. The population was 53 at the 2020 census.

== History ==
Early documentation of the island comes from John Josselyn's 1671 account of New England:

Sagadehock to Nova Scotia is called the Duke of York's Province. Here Pemaquid, Matinicus, Monhegan, Cape Anawhagen…are all filled with dwelling houses and stages for fishermen, and have plenty of cattle, arable lands and marshes.

The island is also mentioned in the May 1717 deposition of two sailors whose trading ship was commandeered off of Cape Cod by pirates from the ship Whydah. They testified that they were forced to sail north with the pirates (under captain Richard Noland of the Whydah's sister ship Anne Galley), who then took a launch "to Matinicus, where they took a sloop belonging to Colonel [Stephen] Minot, one shallop belonging to Captain [John] Lane and three schooners."

In March 1726, Lieutenant Governor Dummer of the Massachusetts Bay Colony documented the early tension between the Native Americans and Europeans in a letter to Captain John Giles:

I very much resent this liberty [the Native Americans at Matinicus] have taken in killing the [livestock] which belong to the English, which is contrary to the Articles of Peace and that common justice which the English and Indians owe to one another.

In 1750, Ebenezer Hall became the island's first permanent settler. Accompanied by his family, he built a house, commenced fishing and farming, and claimed territorial rights to the island. He burned the grass on nearby Green Island to produce hay for his livestock, infuriating the Penobscot tribe, who still used the islands for fishing and sealing. Twice the tribe wrote letters to Royal authorities in Boston, complaining about Hall. In the second, delivered for forwarding on April 25, 1753, to Fort Richmond, they warned, "if you don't remove him in two months, we shall be obliged to do it ourselves." Though Hall was ordered to leave Matinicus, he continued his residence there, and the Penobscots waited not two months but a little over four years before taking action. After a multiple day siege on his house, they killed and scalped Hall on June 10, 1757.

In the following decades several families, including that of Ebenezer Hall's son, moved to the island, and at the census of 1790 there was a total population of 59. The population continued to grow, and on October 22, 1840, the island was formally organized as a plantation.

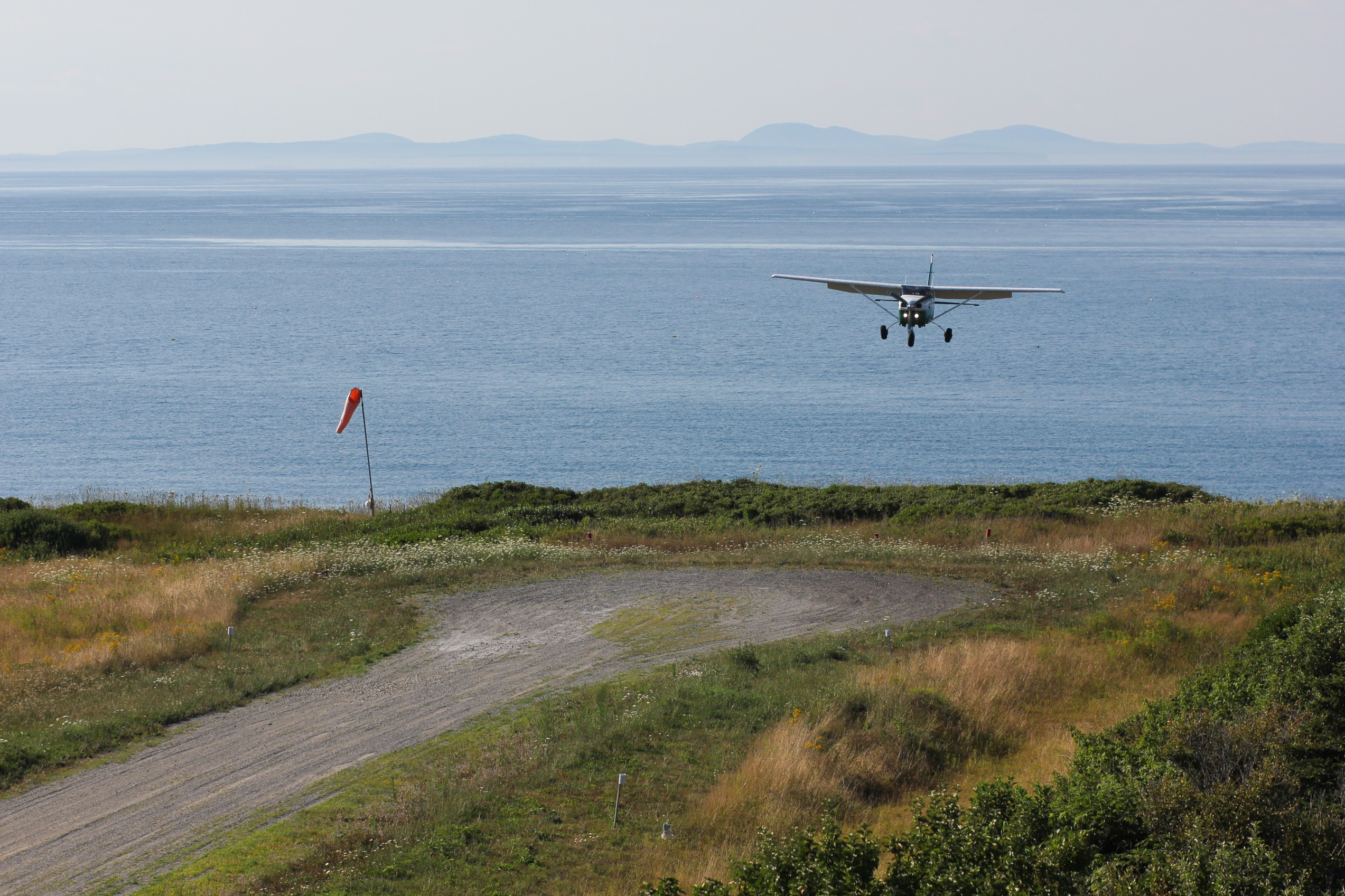
Air taxi landing at Matinicus Island Airport

As a maritime community, the residents of Matinicus have long worked as sailors and fishermen. The early days of fishing for cod, mackerel, and herring gradually gave way to lobster fishing, which continues as the dominant industry on the island today. The importance of this industry to the livelihood of island residents has led to territorial disputes. In July 2009, an island fisherman shot and wounded a fellow fisherman in a dispute over the locations of individual lobster-fishing rights.

The plantation has one church, the Congregational Church of Matinicus, which was built in 1906 and currently holds Sunday services during the summer months and serves as a general community function hall. The island is a routine stop for the Maine Seacoast Mission's vessel the Sunbeam, which offers pastoral care as well as nursing and telemedicine facilities.

The island's inhabitants have served as first responders to emergencies in the waters of Penobscot Bay. On January 16, 1992, residents of Matinicus responded to a distress call from the O.A. Harkness, a nearby sinking tugboat, ultimately rescuing the three crew members. On July 17, 2011, island fishermen rescued 4 occupants of an airplane that ditched into the waters off of Matinicus.

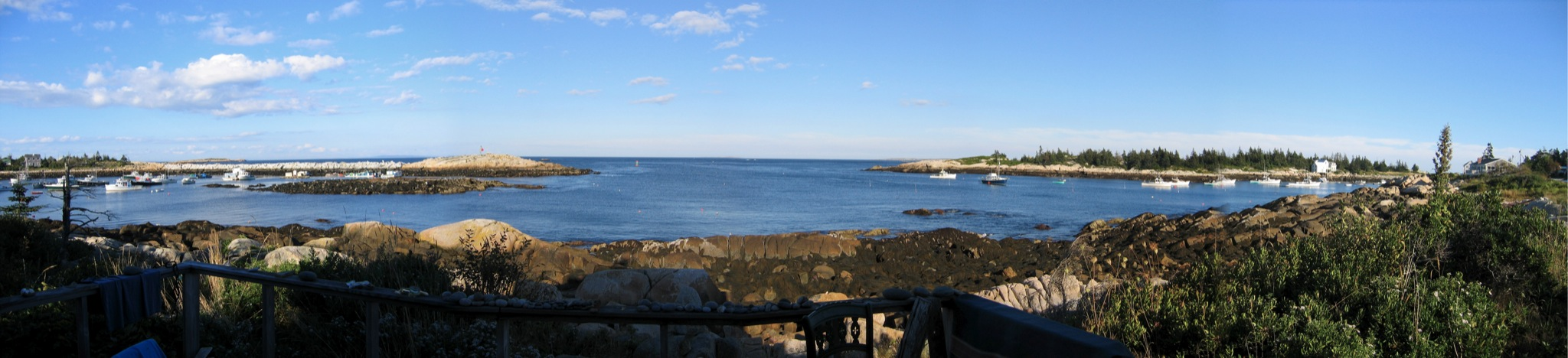
Panorama of the harbor in 2006

Matinicus Island Library, founded in 2016, was featured by Smithsonian Magazine in 2022 for buying books banned by other organizations in the United States. The library is run by volunteers and partially funded by the Stephen and Tabitha King Foundation.

== Geography ==
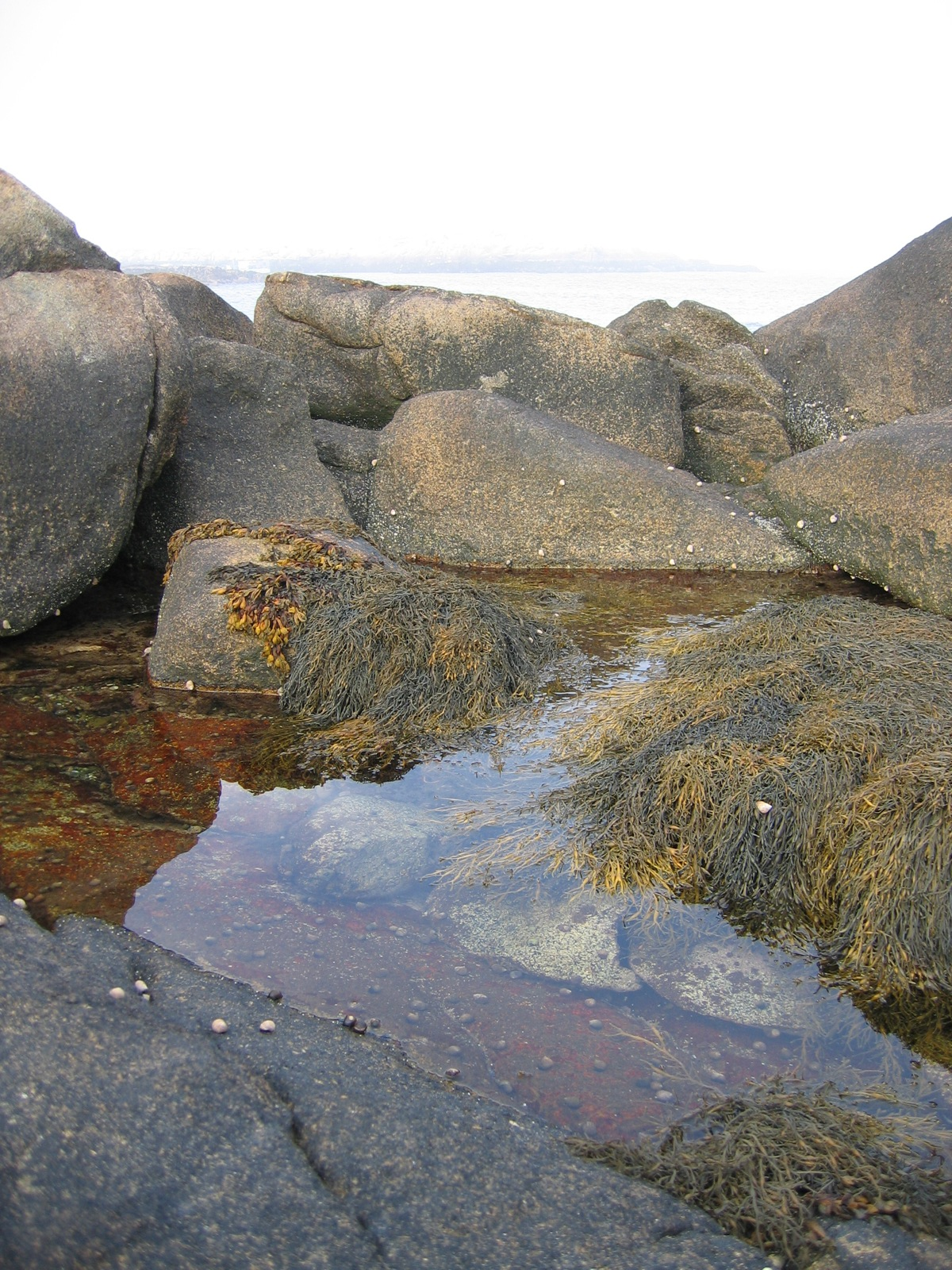
Harbor tidal pool

Matinicus Isle plantation is an archipelago located on the southeastern fringes of Penobscot Bay in the Gulf of Maine, part of the Atlantic Ocean. According to the United States Census Bureau, the plantation has a total area of 9.9 square miles (26 km^{2}), of which 2.3 square miles (6.0 km^{2}) is land and 7.6 square miles (20 km^{2}) is water. Matinicus Island, the largest land mass in the archipelago, spans approximately 2 miles (3.2 km) in length and 1-mile (1.6 km) in width for an area of about 720 acres (290 ha). The elevation ranges from 0 to 100 feet (30.5 m). Matinicus Isle is located approximately 1 mile (1.6 km) north of Criehaven Isle.

The shoreline consists of rocky coves and sandy beaches. The island experiences semidiurnal tides with a difference in sea level of up to 10–11 feet (3.0–3.4 m) between high and low tides.

There are ten major fishing grounds around Matinicus Isle that the island's fishermen use to catch cod, haddock, pollock, cusk, and lobster.

=== Climate ===
Matinicus has a humid continental climate (Köppen climate classification Dfb) with warm, humid summers and cold winters. Compared to the mainland, seasonal climate fluctuations are somewhat moderated by the Atlantic Ocean, resulting in relatively cooler summers and milder winters. Springs are also some of the coolest in the state, and even the whole country. Summers are almost nonexistent due to the moderating effect of the ocean, which also helps to keep year round temperatures above zero and below 75. The common winter freeze and thaw cycles produce much slush. Nor'easters, such as the Blizzard of 1978, can be destructive to the shoreline and infrastructure on the island. Tropical disturbances have been known to occasionally strike the area, typically in the late summer and fall, but they are not very common this far north.

Climate data for Matinicus Island (1981–2010 Averages)
Month	Jan	Feb	Mar	Apr	May	Jun	Jul	Aug	Sep	Oct	Nov	Dec	Year
Mean daily maximum °F (°C)	33.6 (0.9)	33.8 (1.0)	37.5 (3.1)	43.3 (6.3)	52.3 (11.3)	59.3 (15.2)	64.0 (17.8)	65.6 (18.7)	62.5 (16.9)	53.7 (12.1)	46.6 (8.1)	39.1 (3.9)	49.3 (9.6)
Daily mean °F (°C)	27.5 (−2.5)	28.3 (−2.1)	37.1 (2.8)	40.3 (4.6)	48.3 (9.1)	55.1 (12.8)	60.1 (15.6)	61.8 (16.6)	58.4 (14.7)	49.7 (9.8)	42.7 (5.9)	33.8 (1.0)	45.3 (7.4)
Mean daily minimum °F (°C)	21.4 (−5.9)	22.9 (−5.1)	28.6 (−1.9)	37.2 (2.9)	44.4 (6.9)	50.9 (10.5)	56.3 (13.5)	58.1 (14.5)	54.2 (12.3)	45.8 (7.7)	38.7 (3.7)	28.5 (−1.9)	40.6 (4.8)
Average precipitation inches (mm)	3.87 (98)	3.41 (87)	4.63 (118)	4.50 (114)	3.92 (100)	3.83 (97)	3.51 (89)	3.11 (79)	3.91 (99)	4.50 (114)	5.04 (128)	4.40 (112)	48.63 (1,235)
Source: https://prism.oregonstate.edu/explorer/

== Demographics ==
Historical population
Census	Pop.	Note	%±
1790	59		—
1800	53		−10.2%
1810	95		79.2%
1820	105		10.5%
1830	145		38.1%
1840	192		32.4%
1850	220		14.6%
1860	276		25.5%
1870	277		0.4%
1880	243		−12.3%
1890	196		−19.3%
1900	184		−6.1%
1910	179		−2.7%
1920	140		−21.8%
1930	156		11.4%
1940	112		−28.2%
1950	188		67.9%
1960	100		−46.8%
1970	90		−10.0%
1980	66		−26.7%
1990	67		1.5%
2000	51		−23.9%
2010	74		45.1%
2020	53		−28.4%
U.S. Decennial Census

As of the 2010 census, there were 74 people, 41 households, and 16 families residing on Matinicus. The population density was 32.2 inhabitants per square mile (12.4/km^{2}).

The average age of the population was 47.0 years. In terms of age distribution, 20.2% of the population was under the age of 19 years, 66.2% was between the ages of 20 and 64 years, and 13.6% was between the ages of 65 and 84 years. The population was 54.1% male and 45.9% female. The racial makeup of the plantation was 100% white.

The average household size was 1.8 people, and the average family size was 2.8 people. 17.1% of households had individuals under the age of 18 years, and 22.0% had individuals over the age of 64 years. 34.1% of households consisted of married couples living together, and 61.0% were non-families.

There were 147 housing units at an average density of 63.9 per square mile (24.7/km^{2}). 41 homes were occupied, and 99 homes were for seasonal, recreational, or occasional use.

As estimated by the American Community Survey, the per capita income for the plantation in 2015 was $28,801, the mean income for a household was $67,000, and the mean income for a family was $123,354. 22.1% of the population was living below the poverty line.

== See also ==
- List of islands of Maine
- Criehaven, Maine
- Matinicus Rock Light
