= Perkins Township, Maine =

Coordinates: 44°02′46″N 69°48′06″W

- Swan Island Historic District
- U.S. National Register of Historic Places
- U.S. Historic district
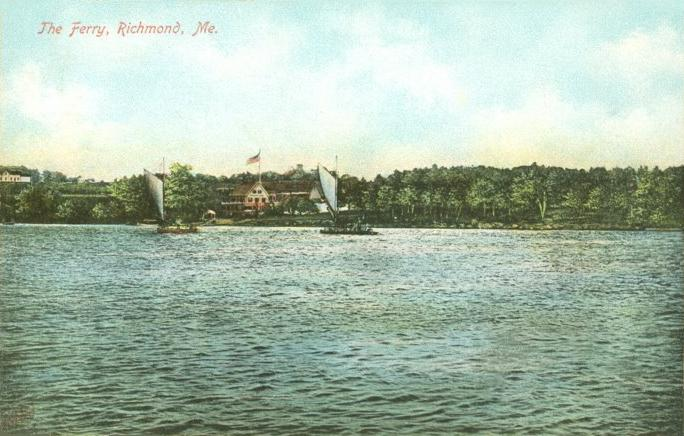
- Ferry from Richmond to Swan Island (ca. 1900)

- Location within Maine Location within the United States
- Nearest city: Richmond, Maine
- Area: 1,500 acres (610 ha)
- Built: 1763
- Architectural style: Colonial, Federal, Late Victorian
- NRHP reference No.: 95001461
- Added to NRHP: December 12, 1995

Perkins Township (Swan Island) is an unorganized territory in Sagadahoc County, Maine, United States. Originally incorporated as the town of Perkins, it was later abandoned, and has been uninhabited since the 1940s. The township comprises Swan Island, Little Swan Island and some tidal flats—all within the Kennebec River between the towns of Richmond and Dresden. The Swan Island Historic District comprises most of the township, with eight buildings, five structures and 1,500 acres (610 ha). Some of the buildings date to the 1750s. The district was added to the National Register of Historic Places in 1995. The entire township is now protected as the Steve Powell Wildlife Management Area, and is under the jurisdiction of the Maine Department of Inland Fisheries and Wildlife. Camping, hunting, fishing, and wildlife viewing are permitted between May and October; reservations are required.

== History ==
The town of Perkins was incorporated in the mid-19th century and then disincorporated in 1918. During the 19th century, the town was a community of almost 100 residents who engaged in shipbuilding, farming and ice harvesting. The island also attracted summer residents who built summer homes, and its most famous summer resident was Thomas Handasyd Perkins. The town was named for him when it was incorporated in the mid-19th century, after he paid for its incorporation.

Besides town government, the town also had a schoolhouse and cemetery. However the town was disincorporated in 1918, so it became a township managed by the state. By the mid-1940s the Great Depression and ongoing pollution of the Kennebec River led to the decline of the island's industries and the island was abandoned.

Little was done until the 1990s when efforts were made to protect some of the buildings, a process that is ongoing.

== Geography and historic features ==
According to the United States Census Bureau, Swan Island has a total area of 9.7 km^{2} (3.7 mi^{2}), of which 5.8 km^{2} (2.2 mi^{2}) is land and 3.9 km^{2} (1.5 mi^{2}) (40.37%) is water. The township consists of Swan Island and Little Swan Island. Swan Island is 4 miles (6.4 km) long and relatively narrow, with its northernmost tip roughly opposite the village center of Richmond, across the main channel of the Kennebec River, and whose southernmost tip is just north of the northern extent of Merrymeeting Bay. Little Swan Island is approximately one-third of the way south of the northern tip of Swan Island, on its eastern side.

Access to Swan Island is via a boat dock near its northern tip. The island is roughly divided by its former main road, which ran along its spine. The land is a mix of woods and former fields, a proportion that is maintained by the state as part of its wildlife management activities. Historic features of the island include several cemeteries and the c. 1763 house of Dr. Silvester Gardiner, one of the island's first colonial owners, and which is one of the state's only examples of 18th-century saltbox architecture.

== Education ==
The Maine Department of Education is responsible for school assignments in unorganized territories. As of 2025 it assigns Perkins Township to two schooling options: Mt. Blue Regional School District (Regional School Unit 9), including Academy Hill School (listed by the National Center for Educational Statistics as having grades 2-5); and Waynflete School.

== See also ==
- National Register of Historic Places listings in Sagadahoc County, Maine
