= Twombly Ridge, Maine =

- Unorganized territory
- Location within Maine Location within the United States
- Coordinates: 45°16′38.2″N 68°15′38.2″W
- Country: United States
- State: Maine
- County: Penobscot

Area
  - Total: 45.1 sq mi (116.8 km^{2})
  - Land: 43.9 sq mi (113.7 km^{2})
  - Water: 1.2 sq mi (3.2 km^{2})
- Elevation: 669 ft (204 m)

Population (2020)
  - Total: 0
- Time zone: UTC-5 (Eastern (EST))
  - Summer (DST): UTC-4 (EDT)
- Area code: 207
- FIPS code: 23-78015
- GNIS feature ID: 582771

Twombly Ridge is an unorganized territory (township) located in Penobscot County, Maine, United States. At the 2020 census, the unorganized territory had a total population of 0.

== Geography ==
According to the United States Census Bureau, the unorganized territory has a total area of 45.1 square miles (116.8 km^{2}), of which 43.9 square miles (113.7 km^{2}) is land and 1.2 square miles (3.2 km^{2}) is water. The total area is 2.70% water.

== Demographics ==
Historical population
Census	Pop.	Note	%±
2000	2		—
2010	0		−100.0%
2020	0		—
U.S. Decennial Census

As of the 2020 Census, there were no people living in the territory.

== Education ==
The Maine Department of Education takes responsibility for coordinating school assignments in the unorganized territory.
