= Hibberts Gore, Maine =

Place in Maine, United States

- New England town
- Gore of Hibberts Gore
- Location in Lincoln County and the state of Maine.
- Coordinates: 44°19′33″N 69°25′39″W
- Country: United States
- State: Maine
- U.S. Congressional District: ME-1
- County: Lincoln

Area
  - Total: 0.75 sq mi (1.95 km^{2})
  - Land: 0.75 sq mi (1.93 km^{2})
  - Water: 0.0077 sq mi (0.02 km^{2})
- Elevation: 292 ft (89 m)

Population (2020)
  - Total: 1
  - Density: 1.3/sq mi (0.5/km^{2})
- Time zone: UTC-5 (Eastern (EST))
  - Summer (DST): UTC-4 (Eastern Daylight (EDT))
- ZIP codes: De facto 04574 (Washington)
- Area code: 207
- GNIS feature ID: 582518
- FIPS code: 23-015-32715

Hibberts Gore (also called Hibberts) is a gore in Lincoln County, Maine, United States. The gore's population was one as of the 2020 United States census.

== History ==
Ignored by the surveyors who mapped Maine, it is one of many locales in Maine that remained unincorporated as most of the rest of the state was divided into cities, towns, and plantations.

== Demographics ==
Historical population
Census	Pop.	Note	%±
1940	1		—
1950	1		0.0%
1980	2		—
1990	1		−50.0%
2000	1		0.0%
2010	1		0.0%
2020	1		0.0%
U.S. Decennial Census

As of the 2020 census, there was one person, one household, and no families in Hibberts Gore.

== Education ==
The Maine Department of Education takes responsibility for coordinating school assignments in the unorganized territory.

== See also ==
- Monowi, Nebraska – an incorporated village with a population of one.
