= Wyman, Maine =

- Unorganized territory
- Location within Maine Location within the United States
- Coordinates: 45°07′40″N 70°22′10″W
- Country: United States
- State: Maine
- County: Franklin

Area
  - Total: 20.2 sq mi (52.2 km^{2})
  - Land: 20.1 sq mi (52.0 km^{2})
  - Water: 0.12 sq mi (0.3 km^{2})
- Elevation: 1,834 ft (559 m)

Population (2020)
  - Total: 82
  - Density: 4.1/sq mi (1.6/km^{2})
- Time zone: UTC-5 (Eastern (EST))
  - Summer (DST): UTC-4 (EDT)
- ZIP Code: 04982
- Area code: 207
- FIPS code: 23-87680
- GNIS feature ID: 582830

Wyman is an unorganized territory in Franklin County, Maine, United States. The population was 82 at the 2020 census. It is designated as Township 4 Range 3 of Bingham's Kennebec Purchase (west of the Kennebec River).

== Geography ==
According to the United States Census Bureau, the unorganized territory has a total area of 20.2 square miles (52.2 km^{2}), of which 20.1 square miles (52.0 km^{2}) is land and 0.1 square mile (0.3 km^{2}) (0.50%) is water. Wyman is home to the Bigelow Public Reserve Land, which protects 36,000 acres (15,000 ha) of land around Bigelow Mountain.

== Demographics ==
Historical population
Census	Pop.	Note	%±
1980	7		—
1990	65		828.6%
2000	70		7.7%
2010	88		25.7%
2020	82		−6.8%
U.S. Decennial Census

As of the census of 2000, there were 70 people, 35 households, and 14 families residing in the unorganized territory. The population density was 3.5 inhabitants per square mile (1.4/km^{2}). There were 160 housing units at an average density of 8.0 per square mile (3.1/km^{2}). The racial makeup of the unorganized territory was 100.00% White.

There were 35 households, out of which 17.1% had children under the age of 18 living with them, 37.1% were married couples living together, and 60.0% were non-families. 40.0% of all households were made up of individuals, and 8.6% had someone living alone who was 65 years of age or older. The average household size was 2.00 and the average family size was 2.64.

In the unorganized territory, the population was spread out, with 12.9% under the age of 18, 24.3% from 18 to 24, 32.9% from 25 to 44, 20.0% from 45 to 64, and 10.0% who were 65 years of age or older. The median age was 34 years. For every 100 females, there were 125.8 males. For every 100 females age 18 and over, there were 144.0 males.

The median income for a household in the unorganized territory was $26,875, and the median income for a family was $41,250. Males had a median income of $22,250 versus $16,250 for females. The per capita income for the unorganized territory was $19,059. There were no families and 3.2% of the population living below the poverty line, including no under eighteens and none of those over 64.

== Education ==
The Maine Department of Education is responsible for school assignments in unorganized territories. As of 2025 it assigns Wyman to the Stratton School (PreK-8 school of Eustis Public Schools) and Rangeley Lakes Regional School (PreK-12 school) in Rangeley.
