= Carroll Plantation, Maine =

- Plantation
- Location within Maine Location within the United States
- Coordinates: 45°23′22″N 68°00′15″W
- Country: United States
- State: Maine
- County: Penobscot

Area
  - Total: 44.1 sq mi (114.3 km^{2})
  - Land: 43.9 sq mi (113.8 km^{2})
  - Water: 0.19 sq mi (0.5 km^{2})
- Elevation: 784 ft (239 m)

Population (2020)
  - Total: 138
  - Density: 3.14/sq mi (1.21/km^{2})
- Time zone: UTC-5 (Eastern (EST))
  - Summer (DST): UTC-4 (EDT)
- ZIP code: 04487
- Area code: 207
- FIPS code: 23-10810
- GNIS feature ID: 582392

Carroll Plantation is a plantation in Penobscot County, Maine, United States. The plantation was named for Daniel Carroll, a signatory of the United States Constitution. It is located along Maine State Route 6 (Main Road) near its intersection with State Route 170. The population was 138 at the 2020 census. It is part of the Bangor Metropolitan Statistical Area.

== Geography ==
According to the United States Census Bureau, the plantation has a total area of 44.1 square miles (114.3 km^{2}), of which 43.9 square miles (113.8 km^{2}) is land and 0.19 square miles (0.5 km^{2}), or 0.39%, is water.

== Demographics ==
Historical population
| Census | Pop. | Note | %± |
|---|---|---|---|
| 2000 | 144 | | — |
| 2010 | 153 | | 6.3% |
| 2020 | 138 | | −9.8% |
U.S. Decennial Census

As of the census of 2000, there were 144 people in 59 households, including 44 families, in the plantation. The population density was 3.3 inhabitants per square mile (1.3/km^{2}). There were 96 housing units at an average density of 2.2 per square mile (0.85/km^{2}). The racial makeup of the plantation was 92.36% White, 2.08% Native American, and 5.56% from two or more races. Hispanic or Latino of any race were 2.08% of the population.

Of the 59 households 16.9% had children under the age of 18 living with them, 67.8% were married couples living together, 5.1% had a female householder with no husband present, and 25.4% were non-families. 16.9% of households were one person and 11.9% were one person aged 65 or older. The average household size was 2.44 and the average family size was 2.70.

The age distribution was 16.0% under the age of 18, 6.3% from 18 to 24, 19.4% from 25 to 44, 35.4% from 45 to 64, and 22.9% 65 or older. The median age was 49 years. For every 100 females, there were 105.7 males. For every 100 females age 18 and over, there were 95.2 males.

The median household income was $21,786 and the median family income was $22,500. Males had a median income of $23,125 versus $29,375 for females. The per capita income for the plantation was $14,294. There were 17.4% of families and 23.6% of the population living below the poverty line, including 38.5% of under eighteens and 19.0% of those over 64.
