= Lakeville, Maine =

Town in Maine, United States

- Town
- Location within Maine Location within the United States
- Coordinates: 45°14′50″N 68°07′25″W
- Country: United States
- State: Maine
- County: Penobscot

Area
  - Total: 65.79 sq mi (170.40 km^{2})
  - Land: 58.33 sq mi (151.07 km^{2})
  - Water: 7.46 sq mi (19.32 km^{2})
- Elevation: 384 ft (117 m)

Population (2020)
  - Total: 104
  - Density: 1.8/sq mi (0.7/km^{2})
- Time zone: UTC-5 (Eastern (EST))
  - Summer (DST): UTC-4 (EDT)
- ZIP Code: 04487
- Area code: 207
- FIPS code: 23-38005
- GNIS feature ID: 582548

Lakeville is a town in Penobscot County, Maine, United States. The population was 104 at the 2020 census.

== Geography ==
According to the United States Census Bureau, the town has a total area of 65.79 square miles (170.40 km^{2}), of which 58.33 square miles (151.07 km^{2}) is land and 7.46 square miles (19.32 km^{2}) is water.

== Demographics ==
Historical population
Census	Pop.	Note	%±
1870	108		—
1880	136		25.9%
1890	144		5.9%
1900	129		−10.4%
1910	96		−25.6%
1920	84		−12.5%
1930	60		−28.6%
1940	71		18.3%
1950	50		−29.6%
1960	21		−58.0%
1970	15		−28.6%
1980	32		113.3%
1990	45		40.6%
2000	63		40.0%
2010	105		66.7%
2020	104		−1.0%
U.S. Decennial Census

=== 2010 census ===
As of the census of 2010, there were 105 people, 55 households, and 32 families living in the town. The population density was 1.8 inhabitants per square mile (0.7/km^{2}). There were 453 housing units at an average density of 7.8 per square mile (3.0/km^{2}). The racial makeup of the town was 95.2% White, 2.9% Asian, and 1.9% from two or more races.

There were 55 households, of which 12.7% had children under the age of 18 living with them, 56.4% were married couples living together, 1.8% had a male householder with no wife present, and 41.8% were non-families. 30.9% of all households were made up of individuals, and 12.7% had someone living alone who was 65 years of age or older. The average household size was 1.91 and the average family size was 2.34.

The median age in the town was 59.3 years. 9.5% of residents were under the age of 18; 2% were between the ages of 18 and 24; 12.5% were from 25 to 44; 47.6% were from 45 to 64; and 28.6% were 65 years of age or older. The gender makeup of the town was 59.0% male and 41.0% female.

=== 2000 census ===
As of the census of 2000, there were 63 people, 33 households, and 16 families living in the town. The population density was 1.1 inhabitants per square mile (0.42/km^{2}). There were 361 housing units at an average density of 6.2 per square mile (2.4/km^{2}). The racial makeup of the town was 93.65% White, 3.17% Native American, and 3.17% from two or more races. Hispanic or Latino of any race were 1.59% of the population.

There were 33 households, out of which 9.1% had children under the age of 18 living with them, 45.5% were married couples living together, 3.0% had a female householder with no husband present, and 48.5% were non-families. 27.3% of all households were made up of individuals, and 15.2% had someone living alone who was 65 years of age or older. The average household size was 1.91 and the average family size was 2.24.

In the town, the population was spread out, with 7.9% under the age of 18, 4.8% from 18 to 24, 15.9% from 25 to 44, 52.4% from 45 to 64, and 19.0% who were 65 years of age or older. The median age was 51 years. For every 100 females, there were 110.0 males. For every 100 females age 18 and over, there were 114.8 males.

The median income for a household in the town was $15,625, and the median income for a family was $16,250. Males had a median income of $23,750 versus $26,250 for females. The per capita income for the town was $14,723. There were 28.6% of families and 40.4% of the population living below the poverty line, including 100.0% of under eighteens and 46.7% of those over 64.

== Education ==
It is in the Lakeville School District.

Maine School Administrative District 30 takes students from Lakeville's school district. It operates Lee/Winn Elementary School in Winn and Mount Jefferson Junior High School in Lee. MASD 30 does not operate a high school, but instead pays Lee Academy in Lee to educate its students at the high school level.
