= Milton, Maine =

- Unorganized territory
- Location within Maine Location within the United States
- Coordinates: 44°27′14″N 70°37′09″W
- Country: United States
- State: Maine
- County: Oxford

Area
  - Total: 14.9 sq mi (38.7 km^{2})
  - Land: 14.9 sq mi (38.7 km^{2})
  - Water: 0 sq mi (0.0 km^{2})
- Elevation: 735 ft (224 m)

Population (2020)
  - Total: 150
- Time zone: UTC-5 (Eastern (EST))
  - Summer (DST): UTC-4 (EDT)
- ZIP Code: 04219
- Area code: 207
- FIPS code: 23-46105
- GNIS feature ID: 2378264

Milton is an unorganized territory (township) in Oxford County, Maine, United States. The population was 150 at the 2020 census. The township was formerly a plantation that surrendered its organization in 1939.

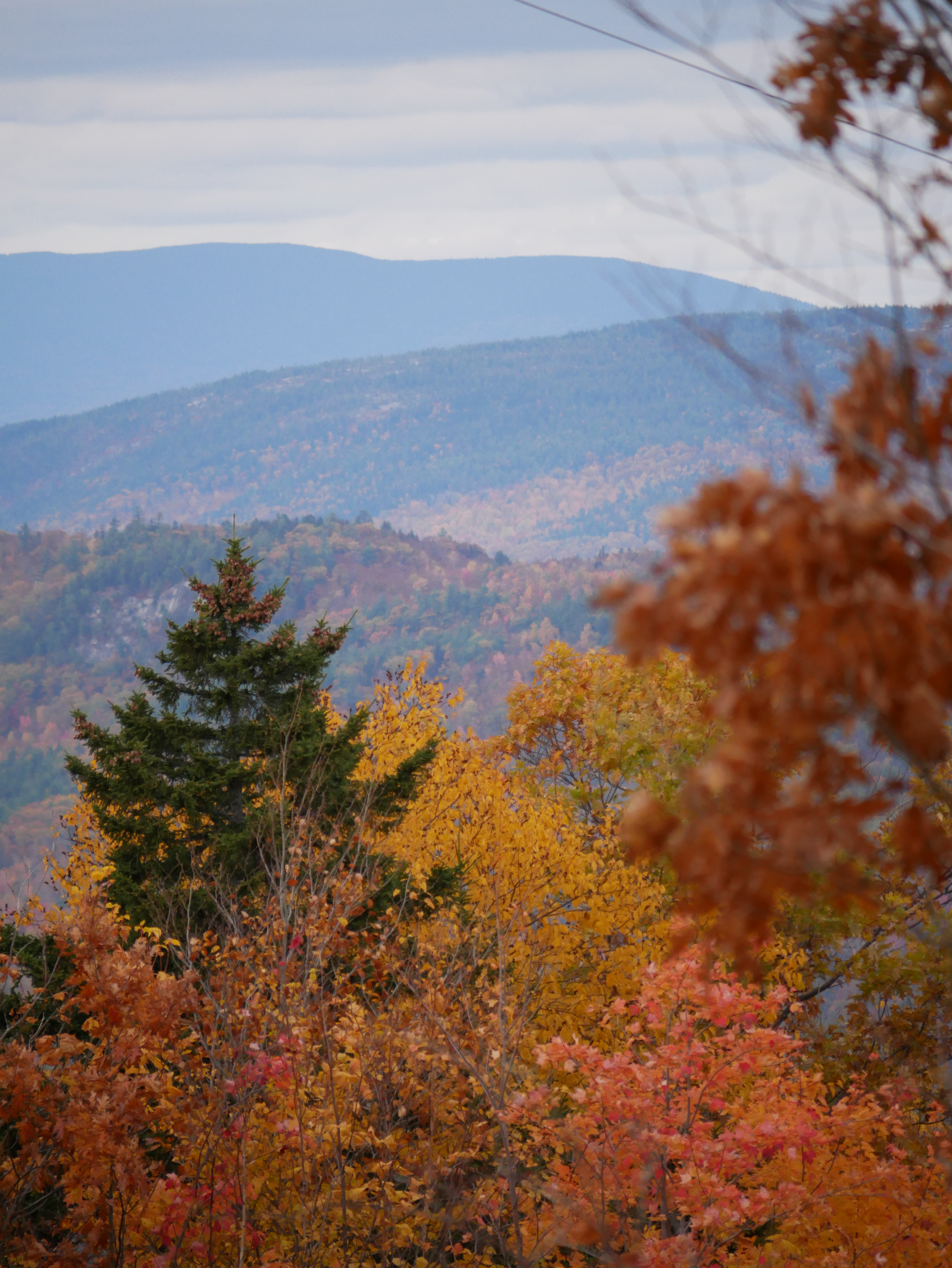
Looking north from Bryant Mountain, within Milton.

== Geography ==
According to the United States Census Bureau, the unorganized territory has a total area of 15.0 square miles (38.7 km^{2}), all land.

== Demographics ==
Historical population
Census	Pop.	Note	%±
1850	166		—
1860	271		63.3%
1870	258		−4.8%
1880	270		4.7%
1890	211		−21.9%
1900	202		−4.3%
1910	204		1.0%
1920	148		−27.5%
1930	111		−25.0%
1940	127		14.4%
1950	159		25.2%
1970	138		—
1980	123		−10.9%
1990	128		4.1%
2000	123		−3.9%
2010	143		16.3%
2020	150		4.9%
U.S. Decennial Census

As of the census of 2000, there were 123 people, 47 households, and 32 families residing in the unorganized territory. The population density was 8.2 inhabitants per square mile (3.2/km^{2}). There were 61 housing units at an average density of 4.1 per square mile (1.6/km^{2}). The racial makeup of the unorganized territory was 100.00% White.

There were 47 households, out of which 40.4% had children under the age of 18 living with them, 48.9% were married couples living together, 17.0% had a female householder with no husband present, and 31.9% were non-families. 27.7% of all households were made up of individuals, and 10.6% had someone living alone who was 65 years of age or older. The average household size was 2.62 and the average family size was 2.97.

In the unorganized territory the population was spread out, with 27.6% under the age of 18, 8.1% from 18 to 24, 32.5% from 25 to 44, 22.8% from 45 to 64, and 8.9% who were 65 years of age or older. The median age was 34 years. For every 100 females, there were 95.2 males. For every 100 females age 18 and over, there were 107.0 males.

The median income for a household in the unorganized territory was $33,750, and the median income for a family was $33,750. Males had a median income of $26,607 versus $21,250 for females. The per capita income for the unorganized territory was $16,450. There were 15.6% of families and 15.7% of the population living below the poverty line, including 25.0% of under eighteens and none of those over 64.
