= North Penobscot, Maine =

- Unorganized territory
- Location within Maine Location within the United States
- Coordinates: 45°52′50″N 68°40′50″W
- Country: United States
- State: Maine
- County: Penobscot

Area
  - Total: 1,118.7 sq mi (2,897.5 km^{2})
  - Land: 1,051.6 sq mi (2,723.6 km^{2})
  - Water: 67.1 sq mi (173.9 km^{2})
- Elevation: 554 ft (169 m)

Population (2020)
  - Total: 405
- Time zone: UTC-5 (Eastern (EST))
  - Summer (DST): UTC-4 (EDT)
- ZIP Codes: 04457 (Lincoln); 04430 (East Millinocket); 04462 (Millinocket); 04460 (Medway); 04733 (Benedicta); 04765 (Patten); 04777 (Stacyville)
- Area code: 207
- FIPS code: 23-52710
- GNIS feature ID: 582635

North Penobscot is an unorganized territory in Penobscot County, Maine, United States. The population was 405 at the 2020 census.

== Geography ==
According to the United States Census Bureau, the unorganized territory has a total area of 1,118.7 square miles (2,897.5 km^{2}), of which 1,051.6 square miles (2,723.6 km^{2}) is land and 67.2 square miles (173.9 km^{2}), or 6.00%, is water. The territory consists of 29 townships, including Mattamiscontis, Herseytown, Lower Shin Pond, Grindstone, Soldiertown, Upper Shin Pond, Hopkins Academy Grant, Long A Township, T3 Indian Purchase, T4 Indian Purchase (two separate townships), and Veazie Gore.

== Demographics ==
Historical population
Census	Pop.	Note	%±
1970	175		—
1980	246		40.6%
1990	403		63.8%
2000	443		9.9%
2010	463		4.5%
2020	405		−12.5%
U.S. Decennial Census

At the 2000 census there were 443 people, 207 households, and 145 families in the unorganized territory. The population density was 0.4 inhabitants per square mile (0.15/km^{2}). There were 1,037 housing units at an average density of 1.0 per square mile (0.39/km^{2}). The racial makeup of the unorganized territory was 97.97% White, 1.35% Native American, 0.23% Asian, and 0.45% from two or more races. Of the 207 households 18.4% had children under the age of 18 living with them, 63.3% were married couples living together, 2.9% had a female householder with no husband present, and 29.5% were non-families. 24.2% of households were one person and 6.3% were one person aged 65 or older. The average household size was 2.14 and the average family size was 2.52.

The age distribution was 15.3% under the age of 18, 3.4% from 18 to 24, 28.0% from 25 to 44, 37.7% from 45 to 64, and 15.6% 65 or older. The median age was 46 years. For every 100 females, there were 104.1 males. For every 100 females age 18 and over, there were 113.1 males.

The median household income was $37,917 and the median family income was $45,000. Males had a median income of $48,438 versus $21,563 for females. The per capita income for the unorganized territory was $20,657. About 2.0% of families and 5.4% of the population were below the poverty line, including 1.3% of those under age 18 and 3.4% of those age 65 or over.
