= Central Hancock, Maine =

- Unorganized territory
- Location within Maine Location within the United States
- Coordinates: 44°37′15″N 68°20′58″W
- Country: United States
- State: Maine
- County: Hancock

Area
  - Total: 16.1 sq mi (41.6 km^{2})
  - Land: 15.2 sq mi (39.4 km^{2})
  - Water: 0.85 sq mi (2.2 km^{2})
- Elevation: 203 ft (62 m)

Population (2020)
  - Total: 132
  - Density: 8.68/sq mi (3.35/km^{2})
- Time zone: UTC-5 (Eastern (EST))
  - Summer (DST): UTC-4 (EDT)
- ZIP Code: 04605 (Fletchers Landing)
- Area code: 207
- FIPS code: 23-11800
- GNIS feature ID: 582401

Central Hancock, also known as Fletchers Landing, is an unorganized territory (township) in Hancock County, Maine, United States. The population was 132 at the 2020 census. The territory is designated as Township 8 Southern Division.

== Geography ==
According to the United States Census Bureau, the unorganized territory has a total area of 16.1 square miles (41.6 km^{2}), of which 15.2 square miles (39.4 km^{2}) is land and 0.9 square mile (2.2 km^{2}) (5.29%) is water.

== Demographics ==
Historical population
Census	Pop.	Note	%±
1970	110		—
1980	124		12.7%
1990	138		11.3%
2000	138		0.0%
2010	117		−15.2%
2020	132		12.8%
U.S. Decennial Census

As of the census of 2000, there were 138 people, 61 households, and 35 families residing in the unorganized territory. The population density was 9.1 inhabitants per square mile (3.5/km^{2}). There were 102 housing units at an average density of 6.7 per square mile (2.6/km^{2}). The racial makeup of the unorganized territory was 94.93% White, 1.45% Native American, and 3.62% from two or more races.

There were 61 households, out of which 29.5% had children under the age of 18 living with them, 36.1% were married couples living together, 14.8% had a female householder with no husband present, and 42.6% were non-families. 31.1% of all households were made up of individuals, and 4.9% had someone living alone who was 65 years of age or older. The average household size was 2.26 and the average family size was 2.89.

In the unorganized territory the population was spread out, with 23.9% under the age of 18, 7.2% from 18 to 24, 31.2% from 25 to 44, 26.8% from 45 to 64, and 10.9% who were 65 years of age or older. The median age was 40 years. For every 100 females, there were 126.2 males. For every 100 females age 18 and over, there were 110.0 males.

The median income for a household in the unorganized territory was $25,750, and the median income for a family was $33,958. Males had a median income of $26,429 versus $21,591 for females. The per capita income for the unorganized territory was $12,286. There were 15.2% of families and 20.7% of the population living below the poverty line, including 14.3% of under eighteens and 33.3% of those over 64.
