= Unity, Kennebec County, Maine =

Unity, Maine
- Unorganized territory
- Location in Kennebec County and the state of Maine.
- Coordinates: 44°37′45″N 69°25′42″W
- Country: United States
- State: Maine
- County: Kennebec

Area
  - Total: 10.4 sq mi (26.9 km^{2})
  - Land: 10.3 sq mi (26.8 km^{2})
  - Water: 0.012 sq mi (0.03 km^{2})
- Elevation: 200 ft (61 m)

Population (2020)
  - Total: 36
  - Density: 3.5/sq mi (1.3/km^{2})
- Time zone: UTC-5 (Eastern (EST))
  - Summer (DST): UTC-4 (EDT)
- ZIP Code: 04988 (Unity)
- Area code: 207
- FIPS code: 23-78190
- GNIS feature ID: 582774

Unity is an unincorporated territory (township) in Kennebec County, Maine, United States. The population was 36 at the 2020 census. The township was a former plantation that surrendered its organization in 1942.

== Geography ==
According to the United States Census Bureau, the unorganized territory has a total area of 10.4 square miles (26.9 km^{2}), of which 10.4 square miles (26.8 km^{2}) is land and 0.10% is water. It is crossed by Maine State Route 139 and is bordered by Burnham on the north, Unity on the east, Albion on the south and Benton on the west.

== Demographics ==
Historical population
Census	Pop.	Note	%±
1860	54		—
1870	68		25.9%
1880	61		−10.3%
1890	62		1.6%
1900	50		−19.4%
1910	56		12.0%
1920	46		−17.9%
1930	34		−26.1%
1940	52		52.9%
1950	44		−15.4%
1960	53		20.5%
1970	45		−15.1%
1980	37		−17.8%
1990	36		−2.7%
2000	31		−13.9%
2010	43		38.7%
2020	36		−16.3%
U.S. Decennial Census

As of the census of 2000, there were 31 people, 15 households, and 9 families residing in the unorganized territory. The population density was 3.0 inhabitants per square mile (1.2/km^{2}). There were 20 housing units at an average density of 1.9 per square mile (0.73/km^{2}). The racial makeup of the unorganized territory was 96.77% White and 3.23% Native American.

There were 15 households, out of which 20.0% had children under the age of 18 living with them, 46.7% were married couples living together, 13.3% had a female householder with no husband present, and 40.0% were non-families. 33.3% of all households were made up of individuals, and none had someone living alone who was 65 years of age or older. The average household size was 2.07 and the average family size was 2.67.

In the unorganized territory the population was spread out, with 19.4% under the age of 18, 3.2% from 18 to 24, 16.1% from 25 to 44, 48.4% from 45 to 64, and 12.9% who were 65 years of age or older. The median age was 50 years. For every 100 females, there were 106.7 males. For every 100 females age 18 and over, there were 108.3 males.

The median income for a household in the unorganized territory was $17,917, and the median income for a family was $25,000. Males had a median income of $18,750 versus $13,750 for females. The per capita income for the unorganized territory was $9,500. There were 16.7% of families and 31.7% of the population living below the poverty line, including 33.3% of under eighteens and none of those over 64.
