= Lambert Lake, Maine =

- Village
- Location within Maine
- Coordinates: 45°32′45″N 67°31′37″W
- Country: United States
- State: Maine
- County: Washington
- Elevation: 440 ft (130 m)
- Time zone: UTC-5 (Eastern (EST))
  - Summer (DST): UTC-4 (EDT)
- ZIP code: 04454
- Area code: 207
- GNIS feature ID: 569341

Lambert Lake is a village in unincorporated Lambert Lake Township, Washington County, Maine, United States. The community is located along Maine State Route 6, 27.5 miles (44.3 km) north-northwest of Calais. Lambert Lake had a post office until October 24, 1987; it still has its own ZIP code, 04454. The Eastern Maine Railway passes through the village of Lambert Lake.

== Education ==
The Maine Department of Education takes responsibility for coordinating school assignments in the unorganized territory. As of 2025 it assigns Lambert Lake to East Range II CSD School, a Pre-Kindergarten to grade 8 in Topsfield (of the Eastern Maine Area School System Alternative Organizational Structure 90) and Lee Academy, a private school in Lee.
