= Connor, Maine =

- Unorganized territory
- Location of Connor, Maine
- Coordinates: 47°00′07″N 68°00′48″W
- Country: United States
- State: Maine
- County: Aroostook

Area
  - Total: 39.4 sq mi (102.1 km^{2})
  - Land: 39.3 sq mi (101.9 km^{2})
  - Water: 0.077 sq mi (0.2 km^{2})
- Elevation: 751 ft (229 m)

Population (2020)
  - Total: 418
  - Density: 10.6/sq mi (4.10/km^{2})
- Time zone: UTC-5 (Eastern (EST))
  - Summer (DST): UTC-4 (EDT)
- ZIP code: 04736
- Area code: 207
- FIPS code: 23-13900
- GNIS feature ID: 2378259

Connor is an unorganized territory (township) in Aroostook County, Maine, United States. The population was 418 at the 2020 census. It is the location of a former Nike missile site and the Blotner Radar Site.

== Geography ==
According to the United States Census Bureau, the unorganized territory has a total area of 39.4 square miles (102.1 km^{2}), of which 39.3 square miles (101.9 km^{2}) is land and 0.077 square miles (0.2 km^{2}), or 0.22%, is water.

== Demographics ==
Historical population
| Census | Pop. | Note | %± |
|---|---|---|---|
| 1880 | 253 | | — |
| 1890 | 526 | | 107.9% |
| 1900 | 453 | | −13.9% |
| 1910 | 609 | | 34.4% |
| 1920 | 585 | | −3.9% |
| 1930 | 626 | | 7.0% |
| 1940 | 739 | | 18.1% |
| 1950 | 630 | | −14.7% |
| 1970 | 575 | | — |
| 1980 | 574 | | −0.2% |
| 1990 | 468 | | −18.5% |
| 2000 | 424 | | −9.4% |
| 2010 | 457 | | 7.8% |
| 2020 | 418 | | −8.5% |
U.S. Decennial Census

At the 2000 census there were 424 people, 162 households, and 127 families living in the unorganized territory. The population density was 10.8 inhabitants per square mile (4.2/km^{2}). There were 193 housing units at an average density of 4.9 per square mile (1.9/km^{2}). The racial makeup of the unorganized territory was 97.88% White, 0.71% Native American, and 1.42% from two or more races. Of the 162 households 35.2% had children under the age of 18 living with them, 64.2% were married couples living together, 4.9% had a female householder with no husband present, and 21.0% were non-families. 14.2% of households were one person and 6.8% had someone living alone who was 65 years of age or older. The average household size was 2.62 and the average family size was 2.83.

The age distribution was 26.4% under the age of 18, 4.5% from 18 to 24, 30.7% from 25 to 44, 28.3% from 45 to 64, and 10.1% who were 65 years of age or older. The median age was 39 years. For every 100 females there were 104.8 males. For every 100 females age 18 and over, there were 97.5 males.

The median household income was $25,417 and the median family income was $26,818. Males had a median income of $22,917 versus $18,182 for females. The per capita income for the unorganized territory was $12,748. About 5.9% of families and 11.8% of the population were below the poverty line, including 11.8% of those under age 18 and 23.3% of those age 65 or over.

== Education ==
The Maine Department of Education takes responsibility for coordinating school assignments in the unorganized territory. The Maine DOE operates Connor Consolidated School. The department sends areas it assigns to Connor to Caribou Middle/High School, operated by Eastern Aroostook RSU 39.
