= Kingman, Maine =

Township in Maine, United States

- Unorganized territory
- Location within Maine Location within the United States
- Coordinates: 45°32′58″N 68°11′58″W
- Country: United States
- State: Maine
- County: Penobscot

Area
  - Total: 25.4 sq mi (65.7 km^{2})
  - Land: 25.0 sq mi (64.7 km^{2})
  - Water: 0.35 sq mi (0.9 km^{2})
- Elevation: 367 ft (112 m)

Population (2020)
  - Total: 137
  - Density: 5.48/sq mi (2.12/km^{2})
- Time zone: UTC-5 (Eastern (EST))
  - Summer (DST): UTC-4 (EDT)
- ZIP code: 04451
- Area code: 207
- FIPS code: 23-37075
- GNIS feature ID: 2378262

Kingman is an unorganized territory (township) in Penobscot County, Maine, United States. The population was 137 at the 2020 census.

== Geography ==
According to the United States Census Bureau, the unorganized territory has a total area of 25.4 square miles (65.7 km^{2}), of which 25.0 square miles (64.7 km^{2}) is land and 0.4 square mile (0.9 km^{2}), or 1.42%, is water.

== Historic Building ==
The Romanzo Kingman House (1872) is on the National Register of Historic Places.

== Demographics ==
Historical population
Census	Pop.	Note	%±
1870	185		—
1880	546		195.1%
1890	671		22.9%
1900	936		39.5%
1910	741		−20.8%
1920	604		−18.5%
1930	495		−18.0%
1940	367		−25.9%
1950	358		−2.5%
1970	264		—
1980	281		6.4%
1990	246		−12.5%
2000	213		−13.4%
2010	174		−18.3%
2020	137		−21.3%
U.S. Decennial Census

At the 2000 census there were 213 people, 91 households, and 66 families living in the unorganized territory. The population density was 8.5 inhabitants per square mile (3.3/km^{2}). There were 114 housing units at an average density of 4.6 per square mile (1.8/km^{2}). The racial makeup of the unorganized territory was 100.00% White. Of the 91 households 23.1% had children under the age of 18 living with them, 64.8% were married couples living together, 6.6% had a female householder with no husband present, and 26.4% were non-families. 22.0% of households were one person and 11.0% were one person aged 65 or older. The average household size was 2.34 and the average family size was 2.66.

The age distribution was 16.9% under the age of 18, 4.7% from 18 to 24, 28.6% from 25 to 44, 30.0% from 45 to 64, and 19.7% 65 or older. The median age was 45 years. For every 100 females, there were 85.2 males. For every 100 females age 18 and over, there were 86.3 males.

The median household income was $21,875 and the median family income was $28,611. Males had a median income of $28,750 versus $22,500 for females. The per capita income for the unorganized territory was $11,490. About 10.3% of families and 16.5% of the population were below the poverty line, including 24.1% of those under the age of 18 and 20.5% of those 65 or over.

== Education ==
The Maine Department of Education takes responsibility for coordinating school assignments in the unorganized territory. As of 2025 it assigns Kingman to: Kingman Elementary School (a school in the unorganized territory operated by the Maine Department of Education), Mt. Jefferson Junior High School (of Maine School Administrative District 30), and Lee Academy (a private school paid by the state).
