= Penobscot County, Maine =

County in Maine, United States

- County
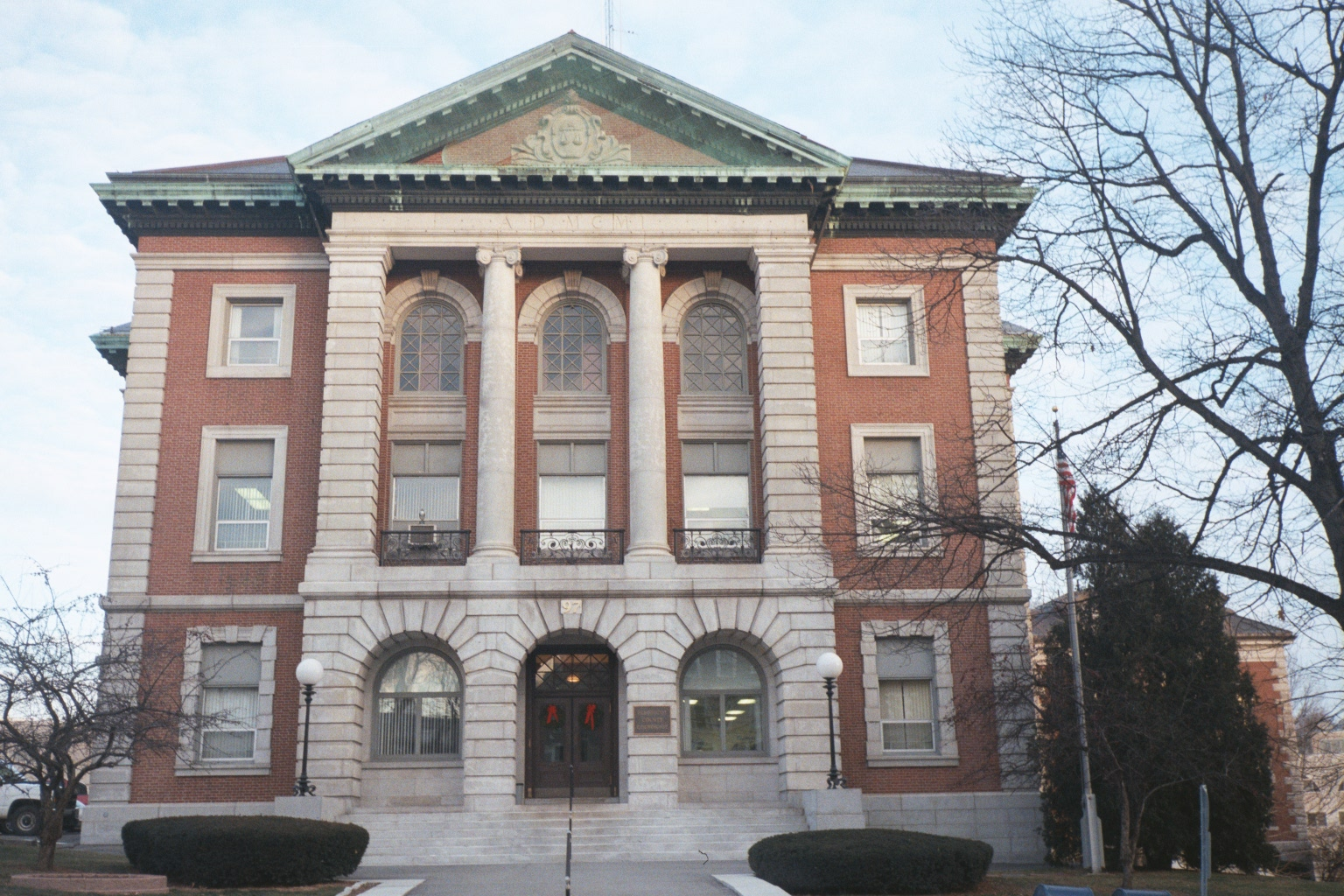
- Penobscot County Courthouse

- Location within the U.S. state of Maine
- Coordinates: 45.40°N 68.63°W
- Country: United States
- State: Maine
- Founded: 1816
- Named for: Penobscot tribe
- Seat: Bangor
- Largest city: Bangor

Area
  - Total: 3,557 sq mi (9,210 km^{2})
  - Land: 3,397 sq mi (8,800 km^{2})
  - Water: 160 sq mi (410 km^{2}) 4.5%

Population (2020)
  - Total: 152,199
  - Estimate (2025): 157,967 ▲
  - Density: 44.80/sq mi (17.30/km^{2})
- Time zone: UTC−5 (Eastern)
  - Summer (DST): UTC−4 (EDT)
- Congressional district: 2nd
- Website: penobscot-county.net

Penobscot County is a county in the U.S. state of Maine, named for the Penobscot people in Wabanakik. As of the 2020 census, the population was 152,199, making it the third-most-populous county in Maine. Its county seat is Bangor. The county was established on February 15, 1816, from part of Hancock County when the area was still part of Massachusetts. Penobscot County is home to the University of Maine.

Penobscot County comprises the Bangor, ME Metropolitan Statistical Area.

== Geography ==
According to the U.S. Census Bureau, the county has an area of 3,557 square miles (9,210 km^{2}), of which 3,397 square miles (8,800 km^{2}) is land and 160 square miles (410 km^{2}) (4.5%) is water. The county highpoint is East Turner Mountain at 2,456 feet (749 m) next to Baxter State Park.

=== Adjacent counties ===
- Aroostook County – north
- Washington County – southeast
- Hancock County – south
- Waldo County – southwest
- Somerset County – west
- Piscataquis County – northwest

=== National protected area ===
- Sunkhaze Meadows National Wildlife Refuge

== Demographics ==
Historical population
Census	Pop.	Note	%±
1820	13,870		—
1830	31,530		127.3%
1840	45,705		45.0%
1850	63,089		38.0%
1860	72,731		15.3%
1870	75,150		3.3%
1880	70,476		−6.2%
1890	72,865		3.4%
1900	76,246		4.6%
1910	85,285		11.9%
1920	87,684		2.8%
1930	92,379		5.4%
1940	97,104		5.1%
1950	108,198		11.4%
1960	126,346		16.8%
1970	125,393		−0.8%
1980	137,015		9.3%
1990	146,601		7.0%
2000	144,919		−1.1%
2010	153,923		6.2%
2020	152,199		−1.1%
2025 (est.)	157,967	▲	3.8%
U.S. Decennial Census; 1790–1960 1900–1990; 1990–2000 2010–2019

=== 2020 census ===
As of the 2020 census, the county had a population of 152,199. Of the residents, 18.2% were under the age of 18 and 19.7% were 65 years of age or older; the median age was 42.0 years. For every 100 females there were 98.0 males, and for every 100 females age 18 and over there were 96.3 males. 42.9% of residents lived in urban areas and 57.1% lived in rural areas.

The racial makeup of the county was 91.5% White, 1.0% Black or African American, 0.9% American Indian and Alaska Native, 1.2% Asian, 0.0% Native Hawaiian and Pacific Islander, 0.6% from some other race, and 4.7% from two or more races. Hispanic or Latino residents of any race comprised 1.8% of the population.

There were 64,250 households in the county, of which 24.3% had children under the age of 18 living with them and 26.5% had a female householder with no spouse or partner present. About 30.7% of all households were made up of individuals and 12.9% had someone living alone who was 65 years of age or older.

There were 74,878 housing units, of which 14.2% were vacant. Among occupied housing units, 66.4% were owner-occupied and 33.6% were renter-occupied. The homeowner vacancy rate was 1.6% and the rental vacancy rate was 6.6%.

Penobscot County, Maine – Racial and ethnic composition Note: the US Census treats Hispanic/Latino as an ethnic category. This table excludes Latinos from the racial categories and assigns them to a separate category. Hispanics/Latinos may be of any race.
Race / Ethnicity (NH = Non-Hispanic)	Pop 2000	Pop 2010	Pop 2020	% 2000	% 2010	% 2020
White alone (NH)	139,461	145,700	138,306	96.23%	94.65%	90.87%
Black or African American alone (NH)	684	1,117	1,443	0.47%	0.72%	0.94%
Native American or Alaska Native alone (NH)	1,423	1,774	1,349	0.98%	1.15%	0.88%
Asian alone (NH)	1,003	1,405	1,853	0.69%	0.91%	1.21%
Pacific Islander alone (NH)	44	41	37	0.03%	0.02%	0.02%
Other race alone (NH)	122	88	420	0.08%	0.05%	0.27%
Mixed race or Multiracial (NH)	1,300	2,178	6,076	0.89%	1.41%	3.99%
Hispanic or Latino (any race)	882	1,620	2,715	0.60%	1.05%	1.78%
Total	144,919	153,923	152,199	100.00%	100.00%	100.00%

=== 2010 census ===
At the 2010 census, there were 153,923 people, 62,966 households, and 38,917 families living in the county. The population density was 45.3 inhabitants per square mile (17.5/km^{2}). There were 73,860 housing units at an average density of 21.7 units per square mile (8.4 units/km^{2}). The county's racial makeup was 95.4% white, 1.2% American Indian, 0.9% Asian, 0.8% black or African American, 0.2% from other races, and 1.5% from two or more races. Those of Hispanic or Latino origin made up 1.1% of the population. In terms of ancestry, 20.9% were English, 17.2% were Irish, 9.4% were American, 7.1% were German, 6.0% were French Canadian, and 5.9% were Scottish.

Of the 62,966 households, 27.5% had children under the age of 18 living with them, 47.1% were married couples living together, 10.3% had a female householder with no husband present, 38.2% were non-families, and 28.0% of households were made up of individuals. The average household size was 2.33 and the average family size was 2.82. The median age was 39.9 years.

The county's median household income was $42,658 and the median family income was $54,271. Males had a median income of $41,094 versus $31,910 for females. The county's per capita income was $22,977. About 10.1% of families and 15.7% of the population were below the poverty line, including 20.4% of those under age 18 and 9.2% of those age 65 or over.

=== 2000 census ===
At the 2000 census there were 144,919 people, 58,096 households, and 37,820 families living in the county. The population density was 43 people per square mile (17 people/km^{2}). There were 66,847 housing units at an average density of 20 per square mile (7.7/km^{2}). The county's racial makeup was 96.60% White, 0.49% Black or African American, 1.00% Native American, 0.70% Asian, 0.03% Pacific Islander, 0.23% from other races, and 0.96% from two or more races. 0.61% of the population were Hispanic or Latino of any race. 17.8% were of English, 17.3% United States or American, 14.0% French, 13.0% Irish and 6.7% French Canadian ancestry. 95.8% spoke English and 2.3% French as their first language. There were 58,096 households, of which 30.10% had children under the age of 18 living with them, 51.50% were married couples living together, 9.90% had a female householder with no husband present, and 34.90% were non-families. 26.70% of households were one person and 10.00% were one person aged 65 or older. The average household size was 2.38 and the average family size was 2.88.

The age distribution was 22.80% under the age of 18, 11.30% from 18 to 24, 29.00% from 25 to 44, 23.80% from 45 to 64, and 13.10% 65 or older. The median age was 37 years. For every 100 females there were 95.30 males. For every 100 females age 18 and over, there were 92.30 males.

The median household income was $34,274 and the median family income was $42,206. Males had a median income of $32,824 versus $23,346 for females. The per capita income for the county was $17,801. About 9.70% of families and 13.70% of the population were below the poverty line, including 15.00% of those under age 18 and 11.10% of those age 65 or over.

== Politics ==
As the most populous county in Maine's 2nd congressional district, Penobscot County's support for Donald Trump in 2016 helped deliver him a split electoral vote from Maine. It was the first time since 1828 that Maine split its electoral votes. Republican strength in the county has increased in each subsequent election (2020 and 2024).

=== Voter registration ===
Voter registration and party enrollment as of March 2024
Republican	35,748	36.01%
Democratic	29,890	30.11%
Unenrolled	27,843	28.05%
Green Independent	3,908	3.94%
No Labels	1,051	1.06%
Libertarian	829	0.84%
Total	99,269	100%

United States presidential election results for Penobscot County, Maine
Year	Republican		Democratic		Third party(ies)	
Year	No.	%	No.	%	No.	%
1880	8,186	52.21%	6,307	40.23%	1,186	7.56%
1884	8,006	56.14%	5,303	37.18%	953	6.68%
1888	7,873	57.97%	5,292	38.97%	415	3.06%
1892	6,571	55.78%	4,516	38.33%	694	5.89%
1896	8,414	66.42%	4,031	31.82%	223	1.76%
1900	6,873	63.87%	3,615	33.59%	273	2.54%
1904	7,013	73.64%	2,225	23.36%	285	2.99%
1908	7,336	66.02%	3,525	31.73%	250	2.25%
1912	3,367	23.91%	5,093	36.17%	5,622	39.92%
1916	7,324	49.41%	7,294	49.21%	205	1.38%
1920	14,145	69.35%	6,110	29.95%	143	0.70%
1924	15,081	74.93%	3,618	17.97%	1,429	7.10%
1928	21,750	70.25%	9,114	29.44%	96	0.31%
1932	18,987	58.75%	13,058	40.41%	272	0.84%
1936	19,077	60.82%	9,732	31.03%	2,559	8.16%
1940	18,674	55.79%	14,757	44.09%	40	0.12%
1944	16,934	55.95%	13,292	43.92%	38	0.13%
1948	16,367	59.92%	10,705	39.19%	243	0.89%
1952	24,614	68.59%	11,222	31.27%	49	0.14%
1956	27,806	76.44%	8,568	23.56%	0	0.00%
1960	28,459	59.75%	19,175	40.25%	0	0.00%
1964	14,449	33.42%	28,766	66.54%	17	0.04%
1968	20,011	44.47%	24,327	54.06%	661	1.47%
1972	30,186	61.92%	18,552	38.06%	11	0.02%
1976	29,016	52.17%	24,672	44.36%	1,925	3.46%
1980	28,869	45.97%	26,519	42.23%	7,405	11.79%
1984	40,403	62.11%	24,445	37.58%	206	0.32%
1988	34,912	54.76%	28,429	44.59%	413	0.65%
1992	24,218	30.11%	29,485	36.65%	26,741	33.24%
1996	22,885	32.45%	35,961	51.00%	11,671	16.55%
2000	35,620	48.66%	32,868	44.90%	4,718	6.44%
2004	40,318	49.10%	40,417	49.22%	1,377	1.68%
2008	37,495	46.60%	41,614	51.72%	1,358	1.69%
2012	36,547	47.28%	38,811	50.20%	1,948	2.52%
2016	41,622	51.68%	32,838	40.77%	6,080	7.55%
2020	44,825	52.57%	37,713	44.23%	2,731	3.20%
2024	47,438	54.48%	37,945	43.58%	1,690	1.94%

== Communities ==
=== Cities ===
- Bangor (county seat)
- Brewer
- Old Town

=== Towns ===
- Alton
- Bradford
- Bradley
- Burlington
- Carmel
- Charleston
- Chester
- Clifton
- Corinna
- Corinth
- Dexter
- Dixmont
- East Millinocket
- Eddington
- Edinburg
- Enfield
- Etna
- Exeter
- Garland
- Glenburn
- Greenbush
- Hampden
- Hermon
- Holden
- Howland
- Hudson
- Kenduskeag
- Lagrange
- Lakeville
- Lee
- Levant
- Lincoln
- Lowell
- Mattawamkeag
- Maxfield
- Medway
- Milford
- Millinocket
- Mount Chase
- Newburgh
- Newport
- Orono
- Orrington
- Passadumkeag
- Patten
- Plymouth
- Springfield
- Stacyville
- Stetson
- Veazie
- Winn
- Woodville

=== Plantations ===
- Carroll Plantation
- Drew Plantation
- Seboeis Plantation
- Webster Plantation

=== Census-designated places ===
- Bradley
- Corinna
- Dexter
- East Millinocket
- Hampden
- Howland
- Lincoln
- Mattawamkeag
- Milford
- Millinocket
- Newport
- Orono
- Patten

=== Unorganized territories ===
- Argyle
- East Central Penobscot
- Kingman
- North Penobscot
- Prentiss
- Twombly Ridge
- Whitney

=== Indian reservation ===
- Penobscot Indian Island Reservation

== Education ==
=== K-12 education ===
School districts include:

- Bangor School District
- Brewer School District
- Burlington Public Schools
- Carroll Plantation School District
- Drew Plantation School District
- East Millinocket School District
- Glenburn School District
- Greenbush School District
- Indian Island School District
- Hermon School District
- Lakeville School District
- Lowell School District
- Medway School District
- Milford School District
- Millinocket School Department
- Orrington School District
- Regional School Unit 19
- Regional School Unit 22
- Regional School Unit 26
- Regional School Unit 34
- Regional School Unit 89
- School Administrative District 23
- School Administrative District 30
- School Administrative District 31
- School Administrative District 41
- School Administrative District 46
- School Administrative District 63
- School Administrative District 64
- School Administrative District 67
- School Administrative District 68
- Seboeis Plantation School District
- Veazie School District
- Woodville School District

Some portions are in the Penobscot Unorganized Territory, which is not in any municipality. The Maine Department of Education takes responsibility for coordinating school assignments in the unorganized territory. The department operates one school, Kingman Elementary School, in Kingman.

=== Colleges and universities ===
University of Maine is in Orono.

== See also ==
- National Register of Historic Places listings in Penobscot County, Maine
