= Maine Department of Education =

State education agency

Maine Department of Education is the state department of education in the U.S. state of Maine. It is headquartered in the Burton Cross State Office Building in Augusta.

The Maine Department of Education is responsible for Maine's public education.

== History ==
From 1854 to 1913 the department was mostly a one-person operation. The Maine board of Education was formally constituted in 1949 and legislation soon increased the size of the department.

The state has debated state and federal funding of public education. In 2004 voters approved a measure requiring the state to pay for 55% of the cost of education. In 2016 voters approved the Maine Question 2 ballot measure to tax income earners over $200,000 to fund public education, but this was not implemented. The state will fund 55% for the 2022 fiscal year.

== Operations ==
The Maine Department of Education takes responsibility for coordinating school assignments in the unorganized territories.

The department itself operates the following public schools in unorganized territories. As of 2025 state-operated schools in unorganized territory are:

- Connor Consolidated School - Connor Township, Aroostook County
- Edmunds Consolidated School - Edmunds Township, Washington County
- Kingman Elementary School - Kingman, Penobscot County

The department previously operated:

- Benedicta Elementary School in Benedicta Township, Aroostook County.
- Brookton Elementary School in Brookton, Washington County. - Closed in 1995.
- Rockwood Elementary School in Rockwood Township, Somerset County.
- Patrick Therriault School in Sinclair Township, Aroostook County.

As of 1998 these schools do not have their own school boards.

In 2003, there were about 1,250 K-12 students in the unorganized territory, with about 1,000 being sent to area schools with tuition money, and about 250 attending schools directly operated by the Maine Department of Education.

== See also ==
- List of admission tests to colleges and universities
- List of school districts in Maine
- Education in Maine
- New England Association of Schools and Colleges (NEASC)
