= John Bunker =

American apple expert

- Born: 1950 or 1951 (age 74–75)
- Occupations: Orchardist; pomologist; apple expert
- Spouse: Cammy Watts

John Bunker (born 1950 or 1951) is an American orchardist, pomologist, and "apple explorer". An expert on American apples and their history, he is the founder of the mail-order nursery Fedco Trees, a division of the cooperative Fedco Seeds. For most of his life, he has worked to preserve rare old apple varieties from across Maine and the New England region. In 2012, he founded the Maine Heritage Orchard in Unity, Maine, a ten-acre (4.0 ha) preservation educational orchard of Maine's historic apple and pear varieties.

== Early life and education ==
Bunker grew up in Concord, Massachusetts, and later in Palo Alto, California, where his father was a professor at Stanford University.

After first visiting Maine in summer 1962 when he was 11 years old, Bunker decided that he wanted to live there. He attended Colby College in Waterville, Maine, graduating in 1972. During his junior year, he bought (together with two college friends) some land in Palermo, Maine.

A few years after graduation, Bunker (who had been working various odd jobs including teaching high school English) was hired by Fedco Seeds of Clinton, Maine.

== Apple activism ==
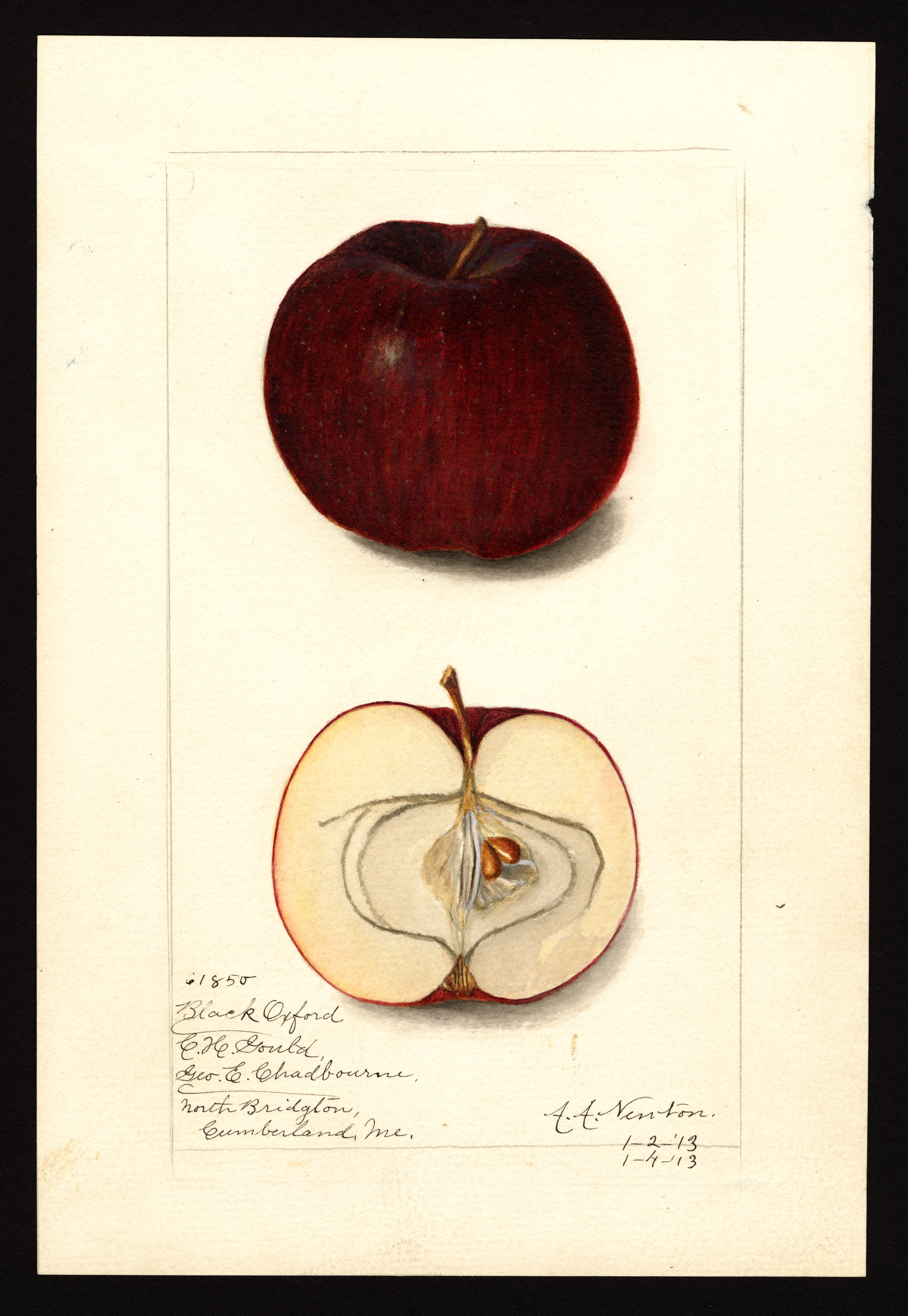
Black Oxford apple (Pomological watercolor from 1913)

After moving to Maine, Bunker began picking local apples from old trees that were no longer being cultivated. He was working as a coop store manager in Belfast, Maine, when a customer brought in some Black Oxford apples to sell. The Black Oxford is a traditional Maine apple that dates back to one seedling found in 1790 in Oxford County. These apples inspired Bunker to begin to graft and propagate scions from old apple trees. According to Bunker, "Sometimes we have an apple and we're looking for a name, and sometimes we have a name and we're looking for an apple."

In 1984, he started a mail-order catalog for heritage apple trees, with the business name of Fedco Trees. The trees are created by grafting shoots from old apple trees onto sturdy rootstock. As Mother Jones explains:

The key thing to understand about apple varieties is that apples do not come true from seed ... If you like the apples made by a particular tree, and you want to make more trees just like it, you have to clone it: Snip off a shoot from the original tree, graft it onto a living rootstock, and let it grow.

In 2012, with help from the Maine Organic Farmers and Gardeners Association (MOFGA), Bunker began developing a gravel pit near the Unity, Maine, fairgrounds into a terraced orchard, whose rootstock could be used to host grafts from heritage apple trees. In 2014, the first trees were planted in what is now called the Maine Heritage Orchard (part of MOFGA). The ten-acre (4.0 ha) publicly accessible orchard includes traditional Maine pear trees as well as apple trees.

Bunker is working to help geneticists create a database of apple DNA by collecting genetic material from new spring leaves of local apple varieties. This project is in collaboration with Cameron Peace at the University of Washington, who also runs an online crowd-sourced DNA-collection website.

== Personal life ==
Bunker lives with his wife Cammy Watts on a 100-acre (40 ha) farm in Palermo, Maine.
