= Moosehead =

Moosehead(s) may refer to:

== Place-related uses ==
- Moosehead, Nova Scotia, a community in Nova Scotia, Canada
  - Dartmouth Moosehead Dry, an amateur baseball team in Nova Scotia
  - Halifax Mooseheads, a team in the Canadian hockey League that plays in Halifax, Nova Scotia
- Moosehead Lake, the largest lake in Maine, US

== Other uses ==
- Moosehead Awards, an Australian comedy award, also known as "Moosehead(s)"
- Moosehead Brewery, Canada's oldest independently owned brewery located and based out of Saint John, New Brunswick
- USS Moosehead, the name of more than one United States Navy ship

== See also ==
- Belfast and Moosehead Lake Railroad (1871–2007), a railway line in Maine, US
- Belfast and Moosehead Lake Railroad (2009)
