= Belfast and Moosehead Lake Railroad (2009) =

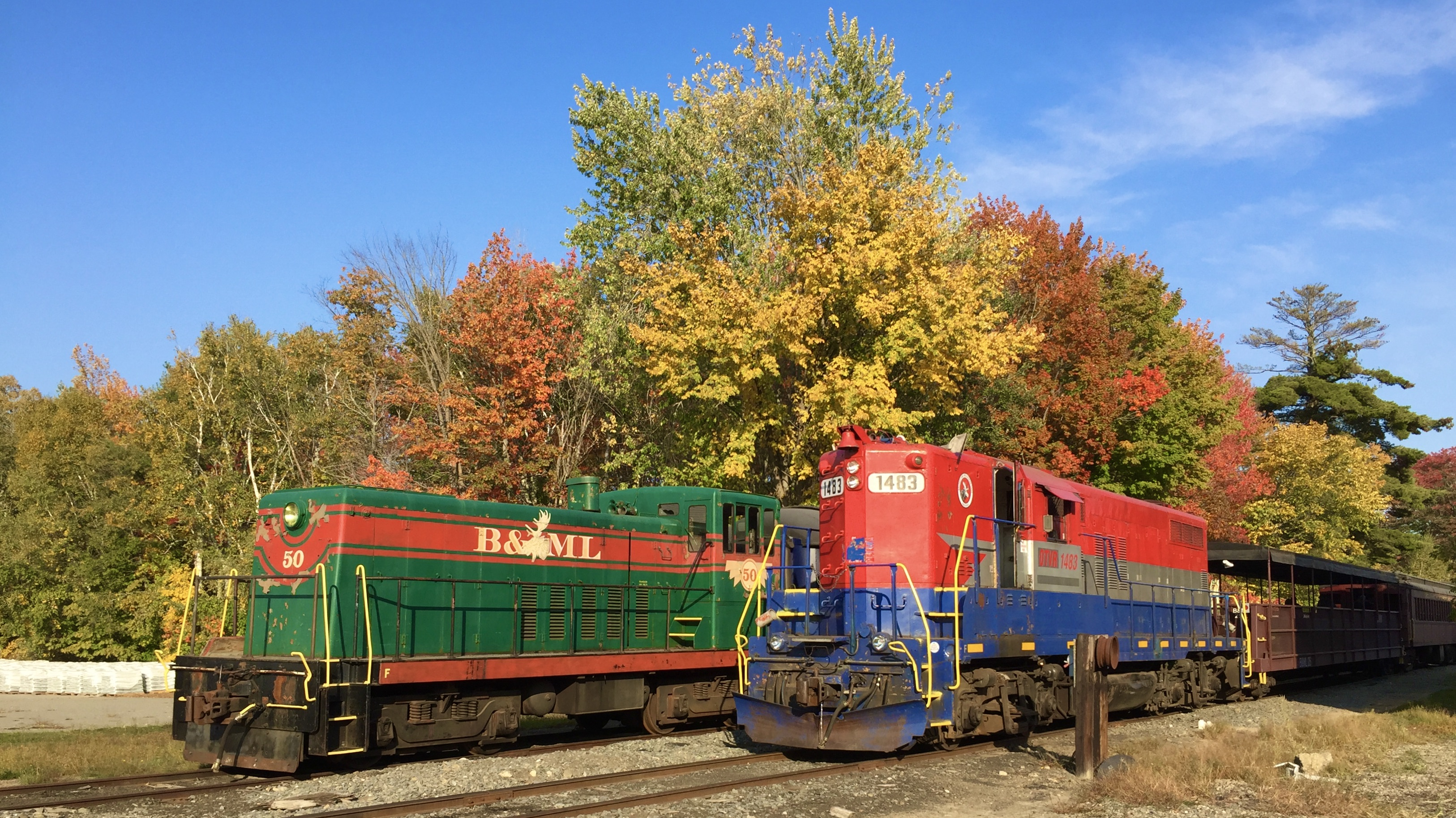
- BML trains resting in Unity Yard (2020)

Overview
- Headquarters: Unity, Maine
- Reporting mark: BML
- Locale: Waldo County, Maine
- Dates of operation: 2009–present
- Predecessor: Maine Central Railroad Co., Belfast Branch (Under lease, 1871–1925); Belfast and Moosehead Lake Railroad Co. (1926–2007)

Technical
- Track gauge: 4 ft 8 1/2 in (1,435 mm) standard gauge
- Length: 30.57 miles (49.20 km)

Other
- Website: belfastandmooseheadlakerail.org/portal/index.php

The Belfast and Moosehead Lake Railroad (operated as the Belfast and Moosehead Lake Railway from 2009 to 2012) is a subsidiary of the Brooks Preservation Society (BPS), a not-for-profit organization established in 2008 to protect and preserve historic rail transportation infrastructure and assets located within Waldo County, Maine.

== History ==
Following the announcement in February 2008 of the formal demise of the original 1867-chartered Belfast and Moosehead Lake Railroad Company (1871–2007) by its then-private not-for-profit operator, the Belfast & Moosehead Lake Railroad & Preservation Society based in Unity, Maine, the BPS was incorporated as an all-volunteer non-profit 501(c)(3) organization to purchase the MEC-built 1892 B&MLRR station house in Brooks (MP 12.27) to save and preserve it as an historic railroad structure.

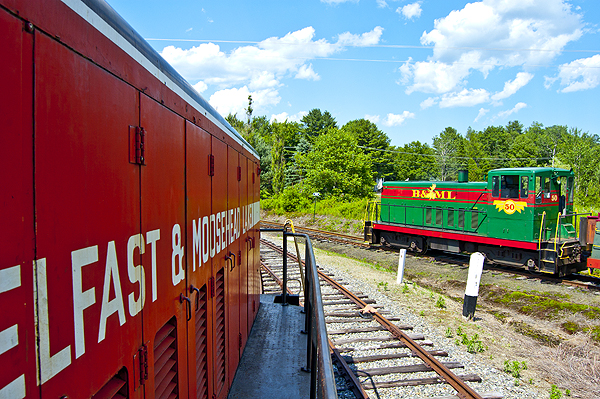
No. 53 (left) and No. 50 (right) at City Point in 2012.

In the months that followed, the BPS acquired several pieces of surviving B&MLRR rolling stock including the road's two still operating 1940s vintage 70-short-ton (63-long-ton; 64 t) GE diesel-electric locomotives: BML#50 that had been bought new by the road in November 1946 to provide the line the first non-steam power to ever operate over its 33-mile (53 km) grade from Belfast to Burnham Junction, and BML#53 that had been acquired by the BML in 1970 from Vermont's Montpelier and Barre Railroad. A track inspection car, open-air observation car, 1926-vintage ex-DL&WRR Pullman-built chair car, ex-MEC stainless steel coach/cafe car, and an ex-MEC caboose were later added to the equipment roster.

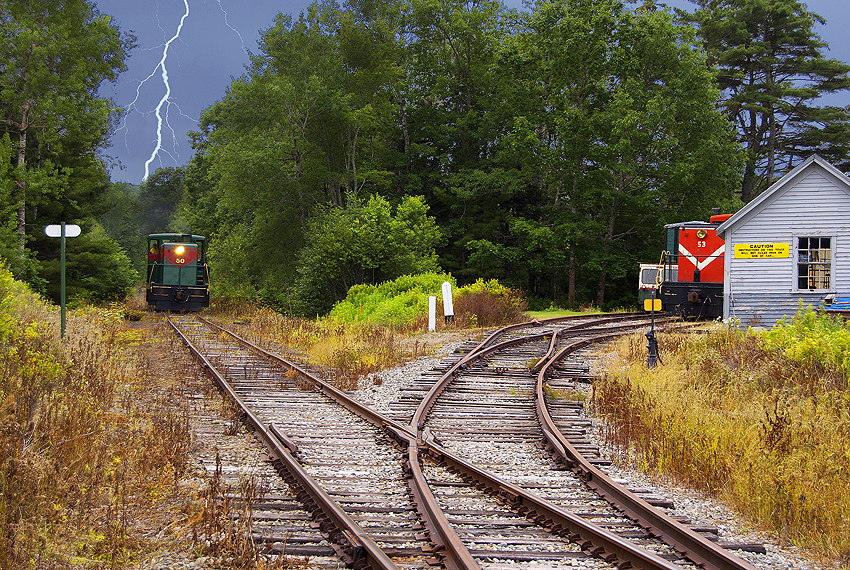
No. 50 (left) and No. 53 at City Point.

In February 2009, the BPS entered into a lease agreement with the Maine Department of Transportation (MDOT) to operate over the State-owned 30-mile (48 km) portion of BML grade running inland from the Belfast/Waldo town line (MP 3.14) to Burnham Junction (MP 33.07) and early that July began operating weekend excursion trains between Brooks (MP 12.27) and Waldo (MP 7.15). The following November the BPS leased the remaining three miles (4.8 km) of grade within the Belfast city limits between the Belfast/Waldo town line and the Penobscot McCrum property line under the US Rt. 1 bridge from its still then owner, Unity Property Management (UPM). This permitted the BPS to establish regular seasonal excursion service from the Upper Bridge (MP 1.2) to Waldo.

In July 2010, the City of Belfast purchased the UPM-owned portion of the grade within the city limits in order to preserve the corridor and with the intention of developing it as a public multi-use rail trail. While exploring how to design and finance such a rail trail, however, the City also agreed to continue to lease that portion of the grade during the interim on a year-to-year basis to the BPS to operate seasonal trains inland from its Upper Bridge station.

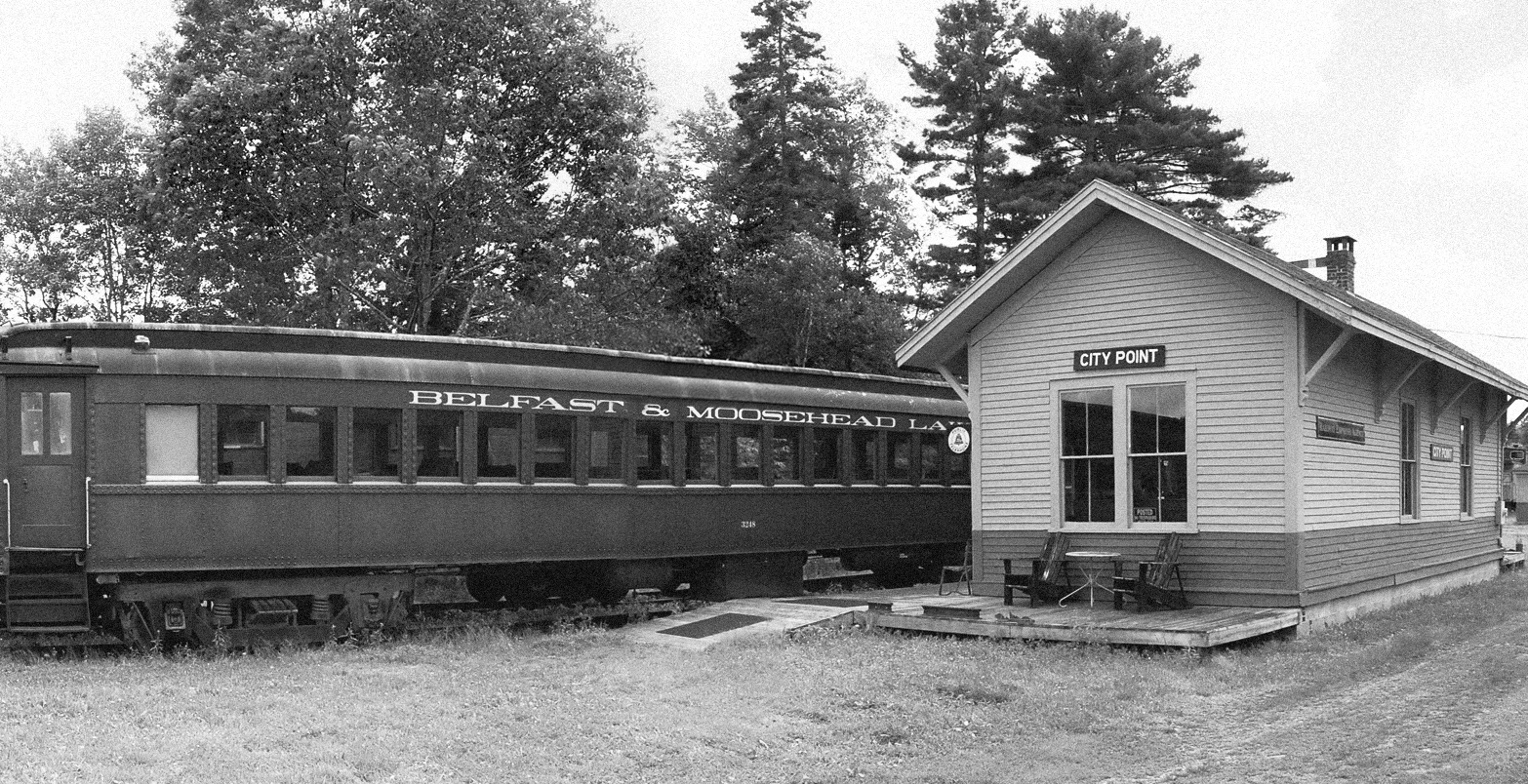
BML#3248 at City Point station where operations were moved in 2013

After two seasons of operations from the Upper Bridge, however, the City cancelled the lease with the BPS in October 2012, and four months later formally applied to the Surface Transportation Board of the US Department of Transportation and the US Department of the Interior for permission under the National Trails System Act (16 USC§1241 et seq.) to "railbank" their portion of the grade from the Belfast waterfront at Pierce Street up to the turnout to the privately owned City Point Central Railroad Museum at MP 2.5 next to the Oak Hill Road grade crossing.

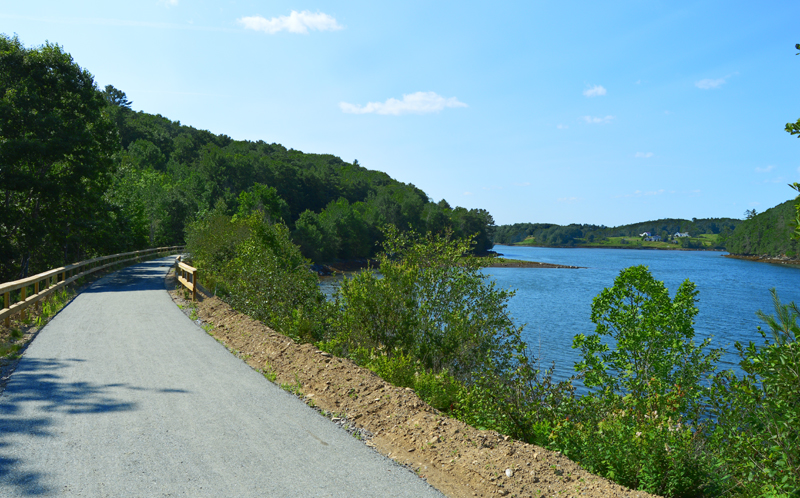
The completed "Passy Rail Trail" converted BML grade near the Beavertail at MP 1.3 (July, 2016)

The loss of the lease with the City forced the BPS to relocate the railroad's excursion train service in 2013 to the 19th century station house at the City Point Museum site, a property which the BPS subsequently purchased from its long-time private owner. The remaining 0.64 miles (1.03 km) of City-owned grade from the City Point turnout to the Belfast/Waldo town line as well as the 30 miles (48 km) of State-owned grade beyond continues to be available to the B&MLRR over which it now operates its scheduled seasonal weekend excursion service from the City Point station to the bogs beyond Waldo, as well as other special event runs and group charters over that and other parts of the line.

In late September 2014, the City began the process of pulling up and scrapping the grade's over 300 short tons (268 long tons; 272 t) of late 19th and early 20th century rolled 75-pound-per-yard (37.2 kg/m) steel rail, spikes, tie plates, sleepers, and other materials. Between May and September 2016 extensive grading, paving, installation of railings and other physical upgrading work was undertaken along the corridor to complete its conversion to a formal pedestrian and bike trail called the "Passy Rail Trail".

As of 2018, operations have since been moved to their current location, Unity, Maine, while City Point Center Yard and Station is now used as a storage area to store their equipment. Passenger trains depart at 11 a.m. and 1:30 p.m. These trains generally head west past Unity Pond, through the Burnham Bog, and then reverse back to Unity Station and Depot. Eastbound trains will terminate either at the Maine Organic Farmers and Gardeners Association Station in Thorndike, ME, or Farwell General Store, also located in Thorndike. Trains run nearly year round, with the winter season picking up in late February, and running through the winter holiday season.

Rail Bike rides are also operated in conjunction with normal trains, only during the summer season. These are pedal-powered carts that ride the rails, with accommodations for two riders per bike along with a baggage compartment.

Over the course of 2018–2021, the BML began acquiring several new pieces of Maintenance of Way equipment. Much was purchased through auction, along with in coordination with the Canadian Pacific Railway in Derby, ME. (Formerly the Central Maine and Quebec Railway). The railroad has been host to many elderly machines from the Bangor and Aroostook Railroad, Montreal, Maine and Atlantic Railway, Canadian American Railroad, and also CSX Transportation. Much of which has been repaired and refurbished for mainline operation, and has aided in tie renewal efforts by the BML, along with the Maine State DOT. Recent achievements include tie renewal to the point of trackage being FRA Class 1 conditions from the line's western terminus at Burnham Junction, to Thorndike Yard, the location of one of the town's former chicken feed mills, ditching and culvert replacement along the entire rail corridor, tree clearing to allow for safe passage of trains, the full restoration of one former Maine Central Railroad Pullman passenger car, along with a Swedish State Railways dining car, the near full rebuild of BML locomotive 53, and replacement and repair of several grade crossings.

== Equipment ==
Locomotive details
Number	Type	Model	Builder	Built	Status	Notes
50	Diesel	70-ton switcher	General Electric	12/1946	Out of service	
53	Diesel	70-ton switcher	General Electric	01/1947	Out of service	
51	Diesel	70-ton switcher	General Electric	12/1946	Display	
1483	Diesel	GP9	Electro-Motive Division	01/1959	Operational	On lease from Otter Tail Valley Railroad
1950	Diesel	44-ton switcher	General Electric	06/1950	Operational	
7926	Diesel	45-ton switcher	General Electric	03/1944	Operational	
1524	Diesel	MP15	Electro-Motive Diesel	01/1982	Operational	Owned by Maine Switching Services
1585	Diesel	GP9u	Electro-Motive Diesel	05/1955	Operational	Owned by LTEX
8231	Diesel	GP9u	Electro-Motive Diesel	02/1958	Operational	Owned by LTEX
3902	Diesel	GP39-3M (rebuilt GP35)	Electro-Motive Diesel	02/1964	Operational	Owned by LTEX
1555	Diesel	GP9u	Electro-Motive Diesel	07/1956	Operational	Owned by LTEX
