= Russell Libby =

- Born: August 16, 1956; Lincoln, Maine, U.S.
- Died: December 9, 2012 (aged 56); Mount Vernon, Maine, U.S.
- Education: Bowdoin College (BA); University of Maine (MS)
- Occupations: Agriculturist, poet, environmentalist
- Years active: c. 1983–2012
- Organization: Maine Organic Farmers and Gardeners Association
- Title: Executive director (1995—2012)

Russell Wayne Libby (16 August 1956 – 9 December 2012) was an American agriculturist, poet, and environmentalist who served as the executive director of the Maine Organic Farmers and Gardeners Association (MOFGA) from 1995 to 2012. Libby, an advocate for local food sustainability, was also a member of the school board, and a selectman for the town of Mount Vernon, Maine.

== Early life and education ==
Russell Wayne Libby was born on 16 August 1956, in Lincoln, Maine, to Ronald and Sandra Libby. He spent his youth in Sorrento birdwatching, exploring local forests, and gardening, a hobby he had picked up after being gifted seeds from his fourth grade teacher.

Libby graduated from Sumner High School in 1974, having been class president. Afterwards he attended Bowdoin College, graduating in 1978 with a bachelor's degree in economics. Sometime thereafter he also received a master's degree (MS) in resource economics from the University of Maine.

== Career ==
=== Development ===
MOFGA was founded in 1971, and Libby joined the board of directors in 1983. He became the executive director in 1995, and was tasked with finding a permanent location for the organization and its six employees. In 1996, MOFGA purchased 200 acres of land in Unity, Maine, and created the Common Ground Education Center, which then became the new site of the Common Ground Country Fair. By 2012, the fair's acreage had doubled to 400, and the organization had 30 employees.

Libby worked for a decade in the Maine Department of Agriculture as a research director. He was also an adviser to the Agricultural Council of Maine, the University of Maine Board of Agriculture, the Maine Farmland Trust, Eat Local Foods Coalition, Fedco Seeds, and the National Organic Coalition.

=== Theories on sustainability ===
Libby was highly critical of the negative effects of DDT, herbicides, chemicals, and organophosphates on both human and environmental health. He also spoke against the idea of corporate food systems, and encouraged local involvement and knowledge of growing practices, in order to reclaim food sovereignty:

I was born in a paper company town, filled with the smell of sulfur. I raked blueberries in commercial fields at the end of the era of DDT. I worked on a golf course where diazinon was commonly used, and organophosphates and herbicides were applied. . . . I was part of a Body Burden study, testing for the presence of [toxins], and I tested high on many. . . . These are systemic problems, and we need to talk about them that way. We need to get toxics out of the system. Out of the food system. Out of the consumer products system. Out of the environment in general.

— Russell Libby

Libby also purported the idea of having a "shared responsibility" for the wellbeing of the environment in the face of potential future problems, like climate change:

It’s up to us—up to all of us—to change the world so every time we look around, we recognize those basic principles of life . . . I want to talk about our shared responsibility to leave this place better than we found it. Not better from a corporate, make-more-money mode, but a place of beauty, a place that gives us great pleasure throughout our days and throughout our lives. Because that sense of beauty, of pleasure in what we are doing each day, is what is going to carry us forward through the difficult times that we live in now, and the more difficult times that lie ahead.

— Russell Libby

=== Later years ===
Libby resigned as executive director of MOFGA on 3 November 2012, yet would continue to assist the organization as a senior policy advisor. By the end of his tenure, MOFGA was reportedly the largest state-level organic association in the United States, with over 6,500 paying members, 418 certified organic farms, a 400-acre fairground, around 1,500 volunteers, and 32 employees.

He later died from cancer on 9 December 2012. In remembrance, state flags were ordered to be lowered to half–mast, for one day, by governor Paul LePage.

== Personal life ==
Libby operated the Three Sisters Farm in Mount Vernon, Maine, with his three daughters and wife, Mary Anne.

== Legacy ==
=== Scholarship ===
Libby is the namesake for the Russell Libby Agricultural Scholars Award, a yearly scholarship of $1,500. It is awarded to Maine high school seniors interested in sustainable farming, or to teachers or institutions intending to create an agriculture–based program in Maine.

== Publications ==
- Balance: A Late Pastoral (2007)
