= Belfast and Moosehead Lake Railroad (1871–2007) =

Belfast & Moosehead Lake Railroad

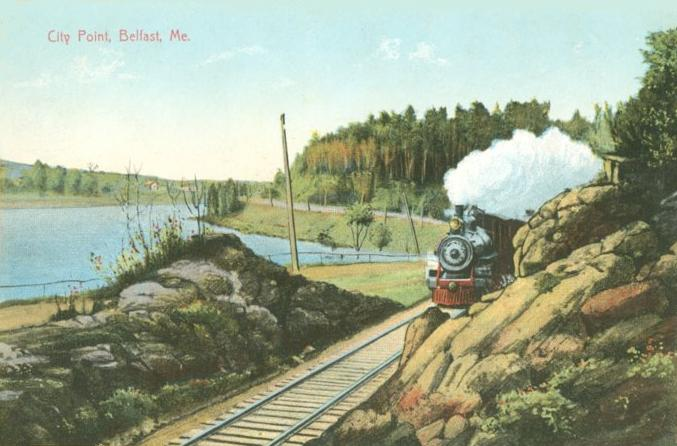
- Train above City Point ca. 1910

Overview
- Headquarters: Belfast, Maine
- Reporting mark: BML
- Locale: Waldo County, Maine
- Dates of operation: 1871–2007
- Successor: Belfast & Moosehead Lake Railway

Technical
- Track gauge: 4 ft 8 1/2 in (1,435 mm) standard gauge
- Length: 33.07 miles (53.22 km)

Other
- Website: belfastandmooseheadlakerail.org/portal/index.php

The Belfast & Moosehead Lake Railroad (reporting mark BML) was a standard-gauge shortline railroad that operated from 1871 to 2007 over a single-track grade from Belfast to Burnham Junction in Maine.

Chartered in 1867, the line was built between August 1868 and December 1870 by the Belfast and Moosehead Lake Railroad Company (B&MLRR), which was majority-owned by the city of Belfast until 1991. For its first 55 years, the road was operated under lease by the Maine Central as its Belfast Branch, which provided daily passenger and freight service to eight stations over the length of Waldo County, Maine. After the MEC cancelled its lease in 1925, the B&MLRR began running trains under its own name. Passenger operations ceased in March 1960, although in 1988, the railroad began operating summer tourist trains to offset a decline in freight traffic. In 1991, the city sold its interest in the money-losing railroad to private owners. In 2007, the railroad ended operations as the B&MLRR.

Today, the line is operated by the non-profit Brooks Preservation Society as the Belfast & Moosehead Lake Railway, and runs weekend excursion trains in the spring, summer and early fall between City Point, Waldo, and Brooks.

== Organization and construction ==
The first attempt to bring a railroad to Belfast, a Penobscot Bay port city that was Waldo County's shire town, came on March 9, 1836, when the Maine Legislature passed "An Act to establish the Belfast and Quebec Railroad Company", but any prospects for financing the project were quickly killed by a provision in the Maine Constitution that prohibited public loans to build railroads and by the Panic of 1837. A second attempt to raise funds for the Quebec route in 1845 also failed, as did an 1848 proposal for a line from Belfast to Waterville, and an 1853 proposal for a line from Belfast via Newport, Dexter, and Dover, to Greenville on the shores of Moosehead Lake.

In 1867, a change in state law finally made it possible for cities and towns to help finance railroads through bond issues. The 47th Maine Legislature soon passed a bill to charter the Belfast and Moosehead Lake Railroad Company, which was signed by Governor Joshua L. Chamberlain on February 28, 1867.

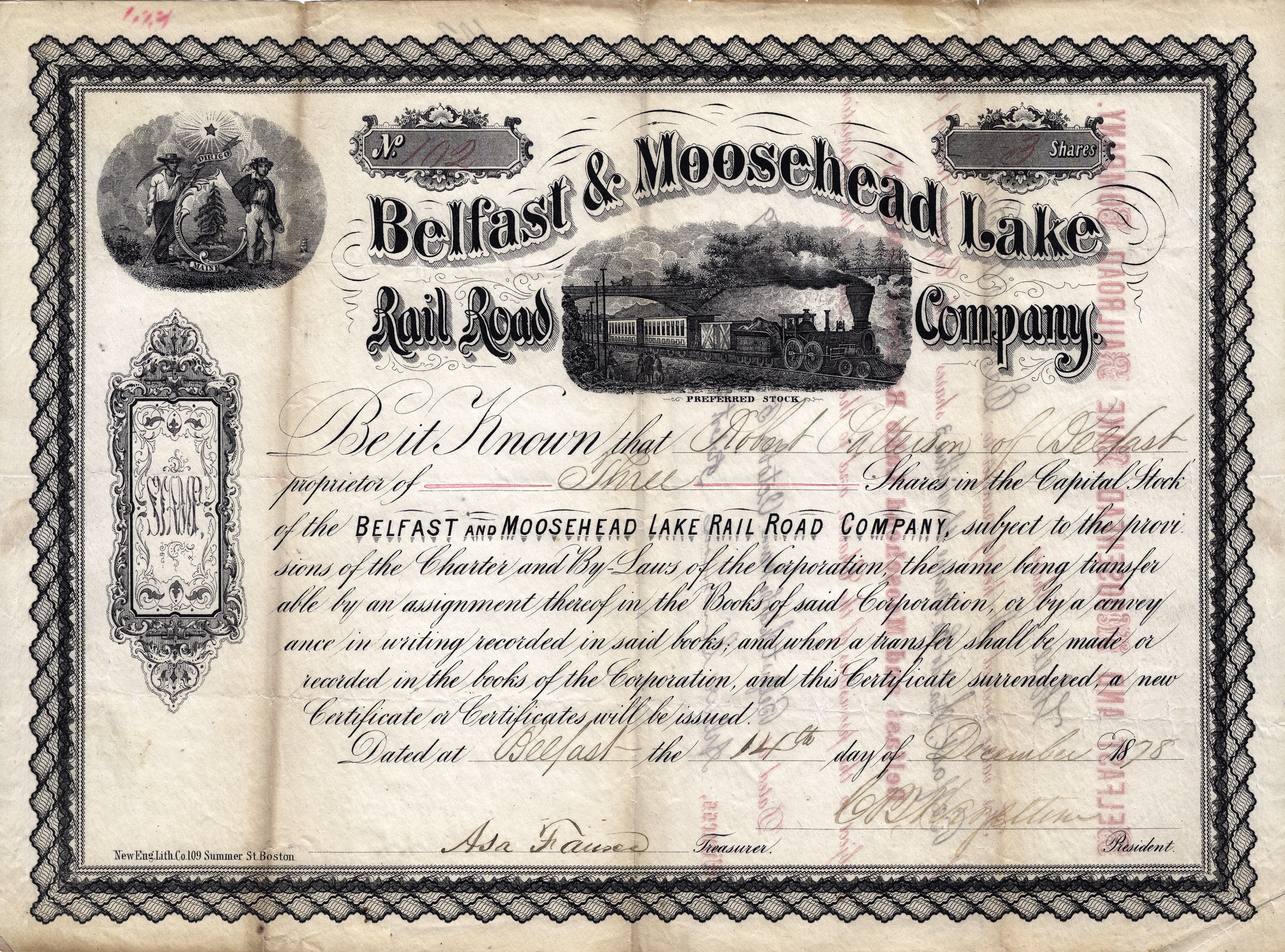
Certificate #102 for three shares of the capital stock of the B&MLRR Co. (1878)

On April 6, 1867, and March 28, 1868, the people of Belfast voted by margins of 865-27 and 854–50, respectively, to authorize the city to issue 30-year, 6-percent bonds to finance their purchase of B&MLRR stock. The bond money bought a total of 5,004 shares of preferred (1,400) and non-preferred (3,604) stock at $100 per share. This would eventually represent 83% of the company's outstanding shares, the rest of which were purchased by several other towns along the line (Brooks, Unity, and Thorndike), and by about 100 private investors, mostly from Belfast and Boston. The corporation was formally organized on July 3, 1867, and after a year of planning, making detailed surveys, and acquiring additional financing, a contract was let to Ellis, Wilson and Hogan Co. of Canada on July 8, 1868, to build the line at a cost of $25,900 per mile.

Ground was broken on the Belfast waterfront on August 4, 1868, at what would become the site of the road's terminal and main yard (milepost "0") for the next 138 years. The railroad's "Last Spike" was driven near Brooks on September 24, 1870, completing a line that stretched 33.07 miles from Belfast inland to Burnham Junction.

== Operations ==
=== MEC Belfast Branch (1871–1925) ===
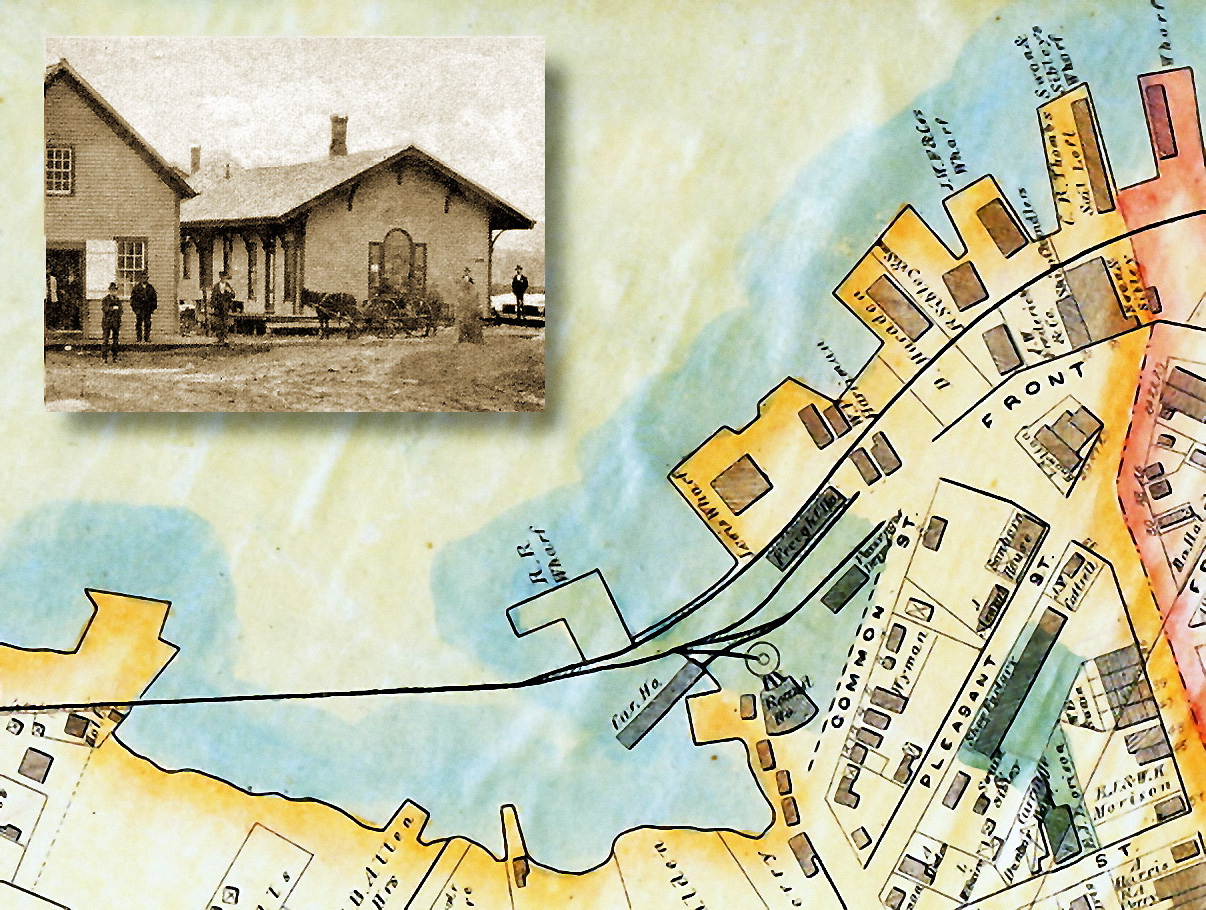
Diagram of the Belfast yard in 1875. Inset: MEC-built Belfast station house ca. 1880.

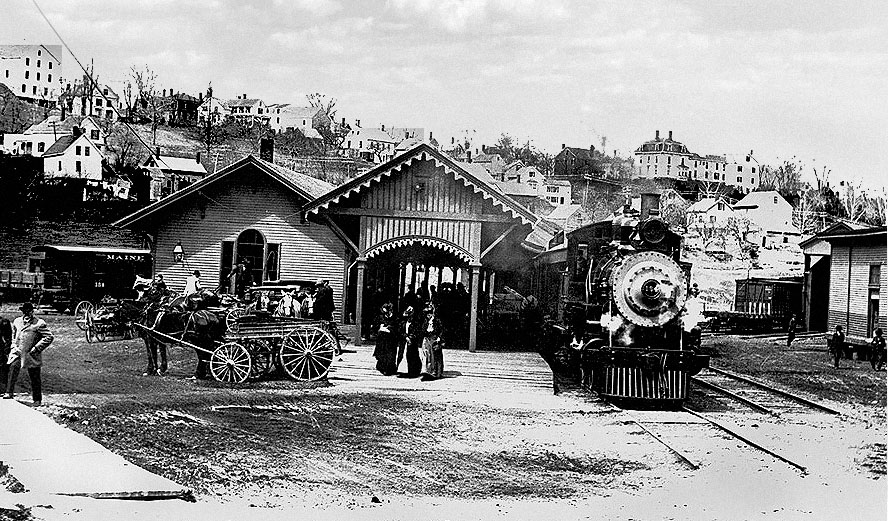
Belfast Station ca. 1900

As the name of the railroad suggests, the original intent was to build the line 88 miles inland to Greenville on Moosehead Lake. Instead, the Maine Central Railroad leased the road, which connected with the MEC's Portland-Bangor main line at Burnham Junction. Located at the far end of Waldo County, the connection was at milepost 97 of the MEC main line, some 14 miles northeast of Waterville (MP 83) and 41 miles southwest of Bangor (MP 138).

Beginning on December 23, 1870, the MEC ran the line as its Belfast Branch. The railroad prospered under the MEC, with three daily round trips for passengers. Most freight during this period was southbound, consisting largely of grain for poultry production in the area, as well as smaller amounts of fish oil, leather, coal, lumber and fertilizer. Outbound freight originally included a large amount of processed fish from Belfast's processing plants; shoes and other manufactured goods from Belfast; farm products from Waldo, Brooks, Knox, and Thorndike; and milk from the Turner Center Creamery in Unity.

=== B&MLRR (1926–2007) ===
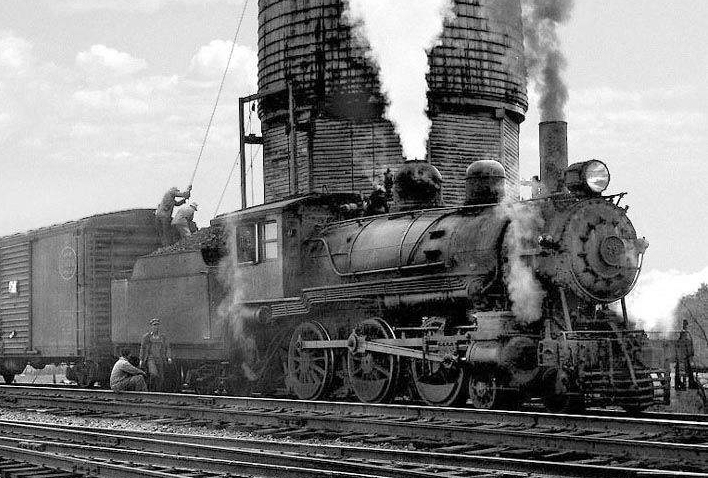
BML#19 waters at Burnham Junction in 1947.

With the decline in American railroad profitability in the 20th century, the Maine Central discontinued its lease of the Belfast Branch on January 1, 1926. The operation of the newly independent Belfast and Moosehead Lake Railroad fell to the city of Belfast, and for the first time, the B&MLRR began running trains under its own name.

In the 1950s and 1960s, much of the freight was chicken feed for the area's poultry houses. The railroad dieselised in 1946 and scrapped its last steam locomotive (BML#19) in 1950. Through this period, the railroad continued to decline. Passenger service ceased on March 9, 1960, after the B&ML lost its U.S. Mail (RPO) contract. There was a burst of good freight business in the 1970s, but by 1990, freight traffic had ceased as well. In the early 1990s, heritage railroad tourist trains began running.

==== Tourist railroad (1991–2004) ====
The MEC-built 1892 station house at Brooks, ME (2004)

In 1991, the city sold its shares of the money-losing operation. The railroad changed hands rapidly since then. It operated diesel excursion runs from Belfast to Waldo and diesel-and steam-powered trains from Unity to Burnham Junction.

The railroad's relations with the city of Belfast deteriorated. In 1995, it built a new station in Unity (MP 24.95) and moved its headquarters there. The year also saw the railroad purchase a steam locomotive, SJ B number 1149, from the Swedish State Railways for its Unity excursions.

In 2004, the railroad ceased operations from Belfast; the following year, the city evicted the railroad from its waterfront yard after the company failed to make lease payments on the property. The yard's turntable and tracks there were pulled up and sold off; the site is now occupied by the Front Street Ship Yard. The railroad suspended operations in 2007.

In February 2009, the Brooks Preservation Society (BPS) entered into an agreement with the Maine Department of Transportation to lease and restore the Belfast & Moosehead Lake Railroad corridor with the intent of restoring railroad activity to Waldo County. BPS began railroad operations under the name Belfast & Moosehead Lake Railway, then changed to Belfast and Moosehead Lake Railroad.

== Locomotives ==
Locomotive details
Number	Builder	Type	Serial Number	Build date	Acquired	Retired	Disposition	Notes
B&M 1329	Schenectady Locomotive Works	2-6-0	4260	1/1895	3/3/1926	9/1927	Scrap	Leased from B&M when B&ML took over operation from the Maine Central
B&M 1334	Schenectady Locomotive Works	2-6-0	4317	7/1895	6/4/1926	10/1927	Scrap	Leased from B&M when B&ML took over operation from the Maine Central
B&M 1343	Schenectady Locomotive Works	2-6-0	4405	1/1896	2/1/1927	3/1928	Scrap	Leased from B&M when B&ML took over operation from the Maine Central
B&M 1359	Schenectady Locomotive Works	2-6-0	4669	1/1899	4/19/1927	9/1928	Scrap	Leased from B&M when B&ML took over operation from the Maine Central
16	Manchester Locomotive Works	4-4-0	1593	7/1893	12/1927	1936	Scrap	Built as Bangor & Aroostook #10, renumbered to #211 in 1907, sold to B&ML
16	Manchester Locomotive Works	4-4-0	1595	8/1893	9/1936	1939	Scrap	Built as Bangor & Aroostook #12, renumbered to #213 in 1907, sold to B&ML
17	Manchester Locomotive Works	4-6-0	1788	8/1901	8/1928	1940	Scrap	Built as Bangor & Aroostook #50, sold to B&ML
18	Manchester Locomotive Works	4-6-0	1790	8/1901	8/1928	1945	Scrap	Built as Bangor & Aroostook #52, sold to B&ML
19	Manchester Locomotive Works	4-6-0	1782	7/1901	1/1940	1950	Scrap	Built as Bangor & Aroostook #44, renumbered to #54 in 1907, sold to B&ML
20	Manchester Locomotive Works	4-6-0	1783	7/1901	11/1939	1947	Scrap	Built as Bangor & Aroostook #45, renumbered to #60 in 1907, sold to B&ML
61	Manchester Locomotive Works	4-6-0	1784	8/1901	4/1945	1947	Scrap	Built as Bangor & Aroostook #61, sold to B&ML
1149	Motala Verkstad; NOHAB	SJ B 4-6-0	None	1913	1995	2004	Sold	Purchased from the Swedish State Railways. It was originally sold to the Great Smoky Mountains Railroad in 2010, but was later purchased and sold to the Discovery Park of America in 2013, where it sits today on static display.
52	General Electric	70-ton switcher	30846	5/1951	5/1951	2000s	Scrap	Scrapped in the early 2000s.
54	General Electric	70-ton switcher	30032	12/1948	Late 1980s	2007	Sold	Purchased from Berlin Mills #15, sold to the Downeast Scenic Railroad in 2010 where it continues to operate in excursion service.
55	General Electric	70-ton switcher	30033	1/1949	Late 1980s	2000s	Scrap	Purchased from Berlin Mills #16, Trucks are in storage at Thorndike Yard, Thorndike, Maine.
