= Clinton (CDP), Maine =

Clinton, Maine
- Census-designated place
- Location in Kennebec County and the state of Maine
- Coordinates: 44°38′24″N 69°29′43″W
- Country: United States
- State: Maine
- County: Kennebec
- Town: Clinton

Area
  - Total: 9.17 sq mi (23.74 km^{2})
  - Land: 8.86 sq mi (22.94 km^{2})
  - Water: 0.31 sq mi (0.80 km^{2})
- Elevation: 164 ft (50 m)

Population (2020)
  - Total: 1,386
  - Density: 156.5/sq mi (60.42/km^{2})
- Time zone: UTC-5 (Eastern (EST))
  - Summer (DST): UTC-4 (EDT)
- ZIP code: 04927
- Area code: 207
- FIPS code: 23-13435
- GNIS feature ID: 2377899

Clinton is a census-designated place (CDP) and the primary village in the town of Clinton in Kennebec County, Maine, United States. The population was 1,419 at the 2010 census, out of 3,486 in the entire town of Clinton.

== Geography ==
Clinton is located in northeastern Kennebec County. It is in the southeastern part of the town of Clinton. The village sits on the north side of the Sebasticook River, a tributary of the Kennebec River. The Clinton CDP includes rural land surrounding the village; it is bordered to the south by the town of Benton, to the east by the Sebasticook River, to the northeast by the Waldo County line with the town of Burnham, and to the north and west by Interstate 95. Access to I-95 is from Exit 138 (Hinckley Road), west of the village. I-95 leads northeast 12 miles (19 km) to Pittsfield and 47 miles (76 km) to Bangor, and southwest 9 miles (14 km) to Waterville and 28 miles (45 km) to Augusta, the state capital. Maine State Routes 11 and 100 run through Clinton village as Main Street, leading northeast 5 miles (8 km) to Burnham village and southwest 7 miles (11 km) to Fairfield.

According to the United States Census Bureau, the Clinton CDP has a total area of 9.2 square miles (23.7 km^{2}), of which 8.8 square miles (22.9 km^{2}) are land and 0.3 square miles (0.9 km^{2}), or 3.39%, are water.

== Demographics ==
Historical population
Census	Pop.	Note	%±
2020	1,386		—
U.S. Decennial Census

As of the census of 2000, there were 1,305 people, 510 households, and 363 families residing in the CDP. The population density was 147.4 inhabitants per square mile (56.9/km^{2}). There were 583 housing units at an average density of 65.9 per square mile (25.4/km^{2}). The racial makeup of the CDP was 98.85% White, 0.08% Black or African American, 0.38% Native American, 0.08% from other races, and 0.61% from two or more races. Hispanic or Latino of any race were 0.77% of the population.

There were 510 households, out of which 34.9% had children under the age of 18 living with them, 52.7% were married couples living together, 13.1% had a female householder with no husband present, and 28.8% were non-families. 21.6% of all households were made up of individuals, and 9.6% had someone living alone who was 65 years of age or older. The average household size was 2.56 and the average family size was 2.95.

In the CDP, the population was spread out, with 27.4% under the age of 18, 8.3% from 18 to 24, 30.3% from 25 to 44, 23.7% from 45 to 64, and 10.3% who were 65 years of age or older. The median age was 36 years. For every 100 females, there were 97.4 males. For every 100 females age 18 and over, there were 91.9 males.

The median income for a household in the CDP was $27,105, and the median income for a family was $32,500. Males had a median income of $24,276 versus $22,167 for females. The per capita income for the CDP was $15,089. About 15.7% of families and 20.8% of the population were below the poverty line, including 29.9% of those under age 18 and 6.6% of those age 65 or over.
