= Dinsmore Grain Company Mill =

- Formerly listed on the U.S. National Register of Historic Places
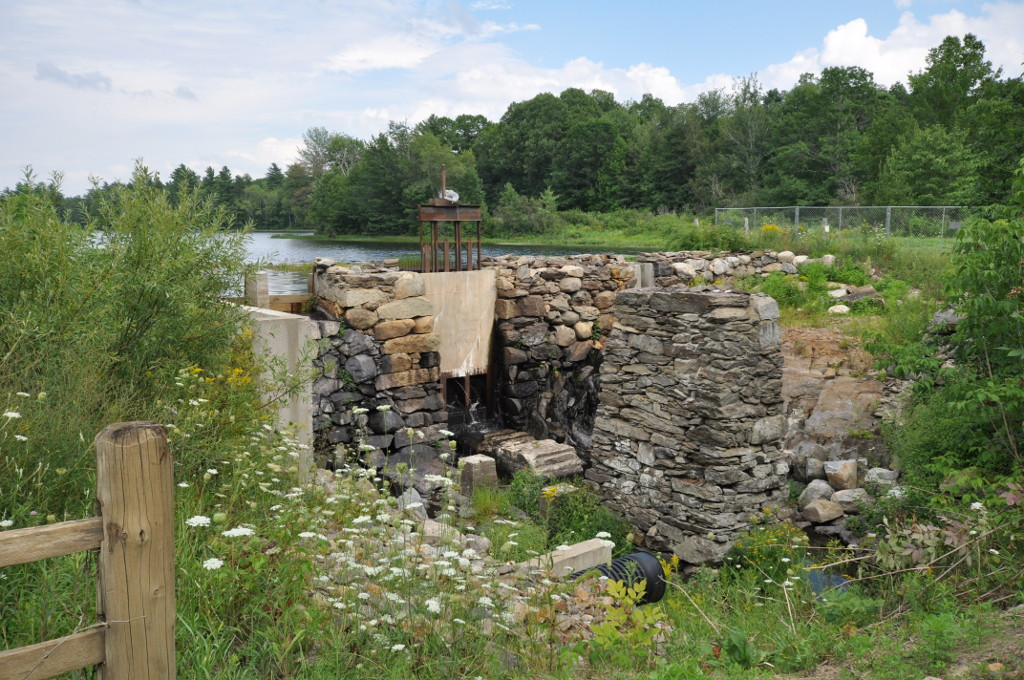
- Foundation and dam of the mill

- Location within Maine Location within the United States
- Location: Branch Mill Rd., just over the line from Palermo in China, Maine
- Coordinates: 44°24′32″N 69°28′28″W
- Area: 1 acre (0.40 ha)
- Built: 1914
- NRHP reference No.: 79000147

Significant dates
- Added to NRHP: November 3, 1979
- Removed from NRHP: March 21, 2023

The Dinsmore Grain Company Mill was a historic early 20th-century mill building on Branch Mill Road in China, Maine, USA. Built in 1914 on a site with nearly 100 years of industrial use, it was (according to its 1979 listing on the National Register of Historic Places) a well-preserved and functional period water-powered grist mill and sawmill. It was demolished in 2017, and delisted from the National Register in 2023.

== Description and history ==
The Dinsmore Mill was located just west of the village center of Palermo, Maine, across the town line in China. It was set astride the West Branch Sheepscot River, which drains Branch Pond to the north and is impounded by the dam located beneath the mill structure. The mill was a 2-1/2 story frame structure, rectangular in shape, covered by a gabled roof and wooden shingle siding. A three-story tower rose near the center of the southern (street-facing) facade; it was also capped by a gabled roof. The ground floor of the building housed the main works, which included a water-driven turbine and the milling equipment. A conveyor belt provided access to the upper floor, which was historically used for the storage of grain.

The first documented mill at this site was in operation in 1817, owned by Joseph Hacker. It was later taken over by Hacker's son-in-law, who partnered in 1879 with his son-in-law, Thomas Dinsmore. Dinsmore passed the mill on to his son, James R.B. Dinsmore. He is responsible for construction of this building, after the older one was destroyed by fire (along with adjacent houses) in 1908. At first just a grist mill, it was expanded in 1935 by James Kenneth Dinsmore to again also function as a sawmill. The mill operated until 1960.

The mill was in the 2010s a source of some local controversy. The main building had deteriorated, and the dam underneath was unable to support the consistently high levels of water desired by the owners of waterfront on Branch Pond and mandated by the state's Department of Environmental Protection. In 2016, the owners reached an impasse with local and state authorities, as they claimed to be unable to lower the water levels sufficiently to effect needed repairs on the dam. They claimed that structural instability due to the building's deteriorated condition would make such repair work difficult and potentially dangerous. The property was acquired in 2017 by the Atlantic Salmon Federation, which subsequently demolished the mill and altered the dam to support the passage of anadromous fish.

== See also ==
- National Register of Historic Places listings in Kennebec County, Maine
