= USS Moose =

Ship name

USS Moose may refer to the following ships of the United States Navy:

- USS Moose (1863), was a wooden steam gunboat purchased by the US Navy in 1863 and decommissioned April 1865
- USS Moose (IX-124), was commissioned in January 1944 and sold in 1951

== See also ==
- USS Moosbrugger (DD-980), a destroyer nicknamed the "Moose" by her crew
- USS Moosehead
