= Martin Greeley =

American politician

Martin Greeley (March 16, 1814 – September 4, 1899) was an American farmer and politician.

Born in Palermo, Maine, he came to Minnesota Territory in 1856. He was a farmer and merchant and lived in Maine Prairie, Minnesota. He went to St. Cloud Normal School (St. Cloud State University). Greeley served in the Minnesota House of Representatives in 1872 and in 1889 and 1890.
