= Unity Pond =

Lake in Maine, United States

Lake Winnecook (Unity Pond)
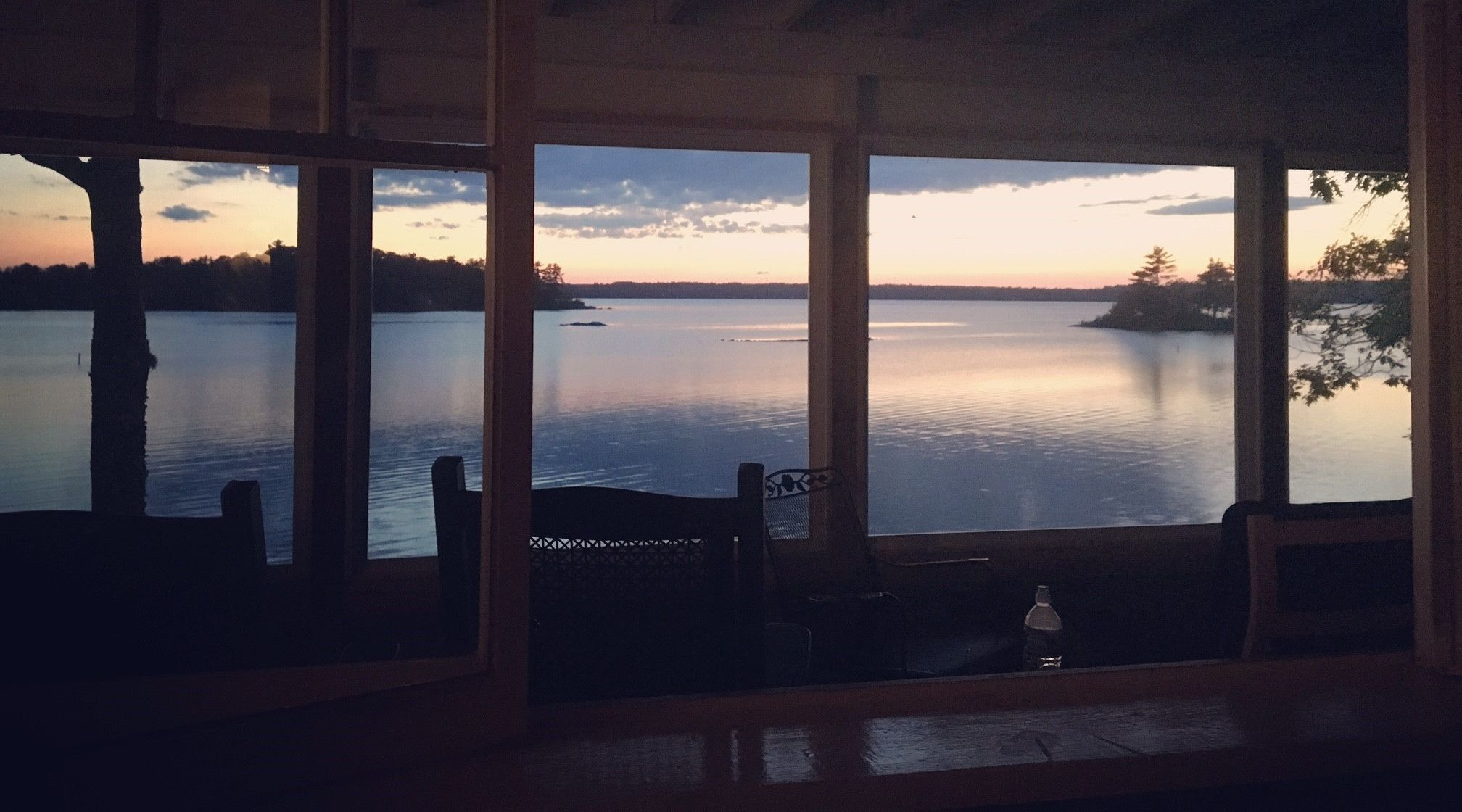

- Location within Maine Location within the United States
- Location: Waldo County, Maine
- Coordinates: 44°38′38″N 69°20′2″W
- Primary outflows: Twenty-Five Mile Stream
- Catchment area: 32.7 sq mi (85 km^{2})
- Basin countries: United States
- Max. length: 4.1 mi (6.6 km)
- Max. width: 1.9 mi (3.1 km)
- Surface area: 2,523 acres (1,021 ha; 3.942 sq mi)
- Average depth: 22 ft (6.7 m)
- Max. depth: 41 ft (12 m)
- Surface elevation: 171 ft (52 m)

Lake Winnecook (Unity Pond) is the largest lake in Waldo County, Maine. It is within the towns of Unity, Burnham, and Troy. The main tributaries are Meadow Brook, Bithers Brook, and Carlton Stream. The sole outflow is Twenty-Five Mile Stream, via a wetlands to the southwest of the lake, which in turn feeds into the Sebasticook River. The lake is surrounded by almost 300 residences, of which slightly more than half are seasonal. It is also used for boating, fishing, camping, and swimming. Kanokolus Beach on the southwest shore and Burnham Town Beach are both open to the public.

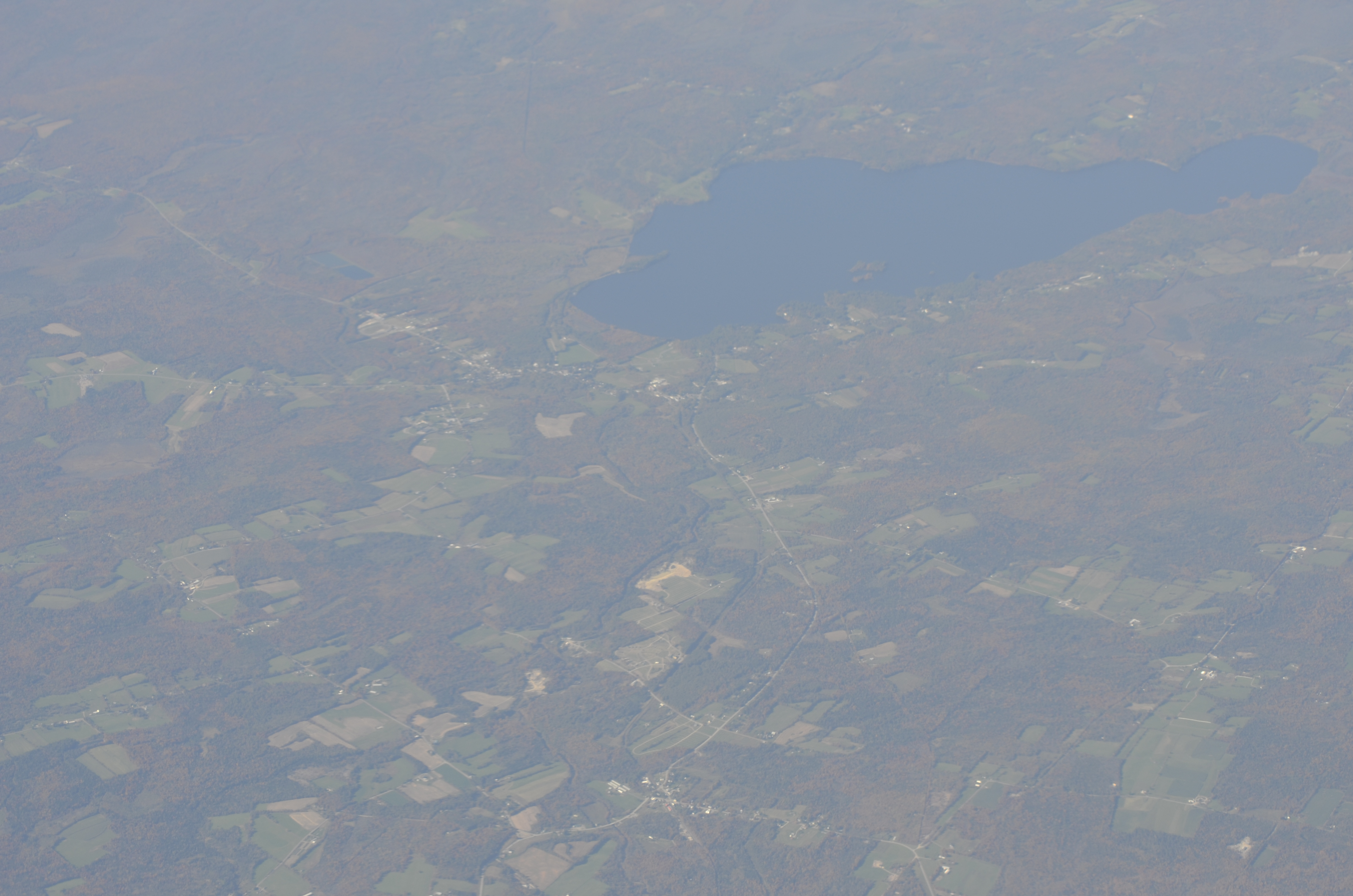
Lake Winnecook (Unity Pond)

== History ==
Europeans first settled Lake Winnecook in 1785. By the early 1800s, sawmills were established along the three main tributaries to the lake. By 1830, however, deforestation caused most of the sawmills to close. Deforestation made agriculture possible, which continued in the lands adjoining the lake well into the 20th century. Canneries were established in the area from the 1920s to the 1950s. As subsistence agriculture declined in the 1940s, it was replaced by poultry and dairy farming, and seasonal camps were built along the lake shore.

== Water quality ==
The lake has been subject to eutrophication caused historically by agricultural runoff and effluent from a canning factory, and is on the state Nonpoint Source Priority Watersheds list, owing to the occurrence of summer algal blooms caused by phosphorus nutrient addition by runoff water. The watershed area surrounding the pond consists of 16.2% developed land, 71.7% non-developed land (consisting mostly of forest), and 12.1% surface water. A total of 20 fish species are found in the lake, including 12 indigenous species. The lake is stocked with trout and alewife.
