= Harry Cail =

American sport shooter

Personal information
- Born: August 12, 1913 Cails Mills, New Brunswick, Canada
- Died: April 4, 2008 (aged 94) Palermo, Maine, United States

Sport
- Sport: Sports shooting

Harry Vaughn Cail (August 12, 1913 – April 4, 2008) was an American sport shooter. He competed in the 50 m rifle event at the 1948 Summer Olympics.
