= Village School (Unity, Maine) =

- U.S. National Register of Historic Places
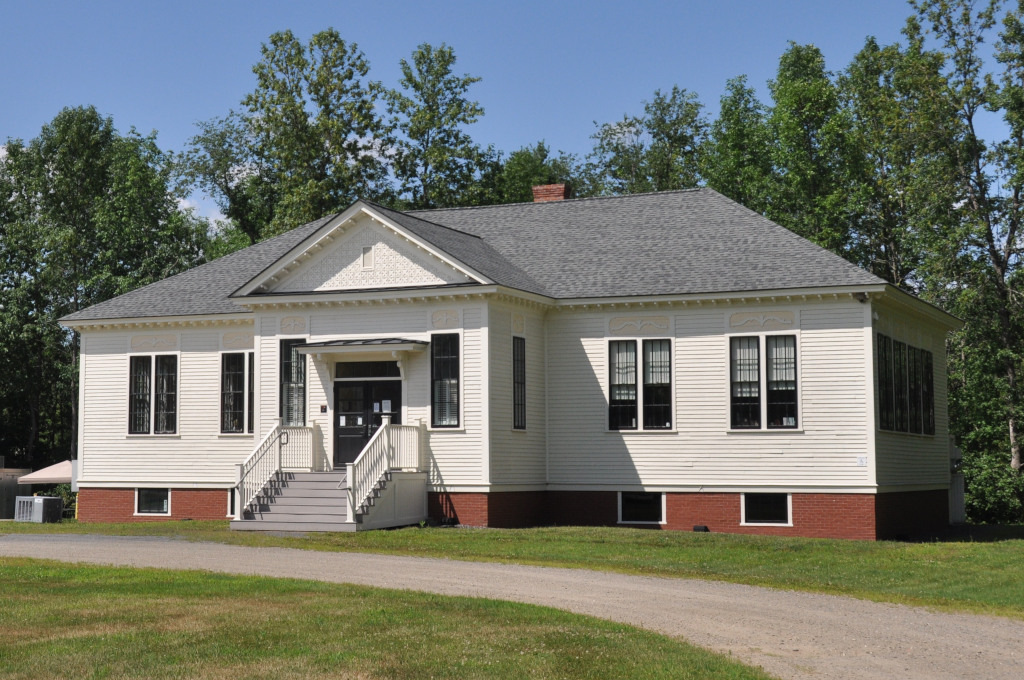

- Location within Maine Location within the United States
- Location: 69 School St., Unity, Maine
- Coordinates: 44.6124°N 69.3376°W
- Area: 1.2 acres (0.49 ha)
- Built: 1898
- NRHP reference No.: 14000363
- Added to NRHP: June 27, 2014

The Village School is an historic former schoolhouse at 69 School Street in Unity, Maine, USA. The building, which includes one storey and three rooms, was built in 1898 and was the largest grade school in Unity until 1953. The school which represents a transitional phase between district schools and fully consolidated district, was listed on the National Register of Historic Places in 2014.

== Description and history ==
The former Village School is located in Unity's central village, on the north side of School Street, west of its junction with United States Route 202. It is a single story wood-frame structure, with a roughly cruciform shape set on a foundation that is built from a combination of stone, brick, and concrete block. Its main block is oriented east–west, with a hipped roof and a gabled front projection that houses the entry and the building's restrooms. The front-facing gable is fully pedimented, and it and the main eave are studded with decorative brackets. The gable pediment is filled with a Queen Anne style floral decorative pattern. The entrance is sheltered by a hip-roofed hood that is supported by large decorative brackets. The interior is divided into three classrooms, accessed via central hall. The walls are finished in vertical beadboard wainscoting, with either plaster of horizontal beadboard above.

The town of Unity was incorporated in 1804, and for most of the 19th century had small district schools for the education of its children. In 1894 the state enacted legislation that encouraged the consolidation of school districts in order to improve quality and building standards. The town, whose population and student enrollment had been declining, voted in 1898 to build this school, which effectively replaced four of its eight district schools. It remained the town's largest primary school until 1953, when increasing enrollment and school overcrowding prompted the decision to build a new elementary school. The school was designed by James R. Taber, and was built on land purchased from him by the town at a cost of under $3,000. This school was closed, and used by the administration for storage.

== See also ==
- National Register of Historic Places in Waldo County, Maine
