= Carlton Pond Waterfowl Production Area =

Artificial pond and wetland in Maine, US

- IUCN category IV (habitat/species management area)
- Location within Maine
- Location: Waldo County, Maine; United States
- Nearest city: Troy, Maine
- Coordinates: 44.710°N 69.270°W
- Area: 1,055-acre (4.27 km^{2})
- Established: 1966
- Governing body: U.S. Fish and Wildlife Service
- Website: Carlton Pond Waterfowl Production Area

Carlton Pond Waterfowl Production Area is a 1,055-acre (4.27 km^{2}) artificial pond and wetland located in the town of Troy in Waldo County, Maine. The pond is formed by an earthen dam which backs up Carlton Brook. The area was acquired by the United States Fish and Wildlife Service in 1966 to protect the waterfowl and other wildlife associated with this area in Central Maine.

The original dam at Carlton Pond was a rock structure built in 1850 to provide water power for a sawmill operation. In 1972, the Fish and Wildlife Service reconstructed the dam to maintain the integrity of the structure and to assure continued maintenance of the open water, marsh, and wetland areas created by the original dam. A natural overflow near the structure provides an additional escape route for high water thereby affording extra protection for the dam and control structures. A right-of-way provides access to the dam for maintenance and public use.

Carlton Pond is one of the few areas in the state which provides nesting habitat for black terns, which are on the endangered species list maintained by the State of Maine. State and federal non-game biologists and researchers have been monitoring black tern use of Carlton Pond WPA and other areas for several years in an attempt to better determine the species' population status.

Carlton Pond WPA has historically provided good nesting habitat for waterfowl and other birds. To date, 33 bird species have been observed using refuge lands and waters. Many bird species that use Carlton Pond have been listed by the Partners-in-Flight organization as species that are declining. The Slender Blue Flag, a species listed as Threatened by the State of Maine, has been sighted at Carlton Pond.
