= Sheepscot Pond =

- Location within Maine Location within the United States
- Location: Waldo County, Maine
- Coordinates: 44°21′30″N 69°25′54″W
- Type: reservoir
- Primary inflows: Sheepscot River
- Primary outflows: Sheepscot River
- Basin countries: United States
- Max. length: 3 mi (4.8 km)
- Max. width: 1.4 mi (2.3 km)
- Surface area: 1,215 acres (492 ha; 1.898 sq mi) (or 1,193 acres)
- Average depth: 42 ft (13 m)
- Max. depth: 150 ft (46 m)
- Surface elevation: 284 ft (87 m)

Sheepscot Pond (also called Sheepscot Lake) is the third-largest lake in Waldo County, Maine. It is in the township of Palermo, on the western edge of Waldo County.

The lake has a maximum depth of 150 feet with well-oxygenated water. It contains more than 20 species of fish, and has historically been stocked with salmon, lake trout, and brook trout. Attempts have been made to limit the lamprey eel population by closing the Alaskan Steep-Pass fishway to anadromous fish during their spawning migrations.

The Maine Department of Environmental Protection has rated the water quality of Sheepscot Pond as average, with total phosphorus concentrations of 5-10 parts per billion, and no significant positive or negative trend in Secchi disk transparencies.

The lake provides water for the Palermo Fish Cultural Station.

== See also ==
- List of lakes in Maine
