= Troy, Maine =

Town in Maine, United States

- Town
- Seal

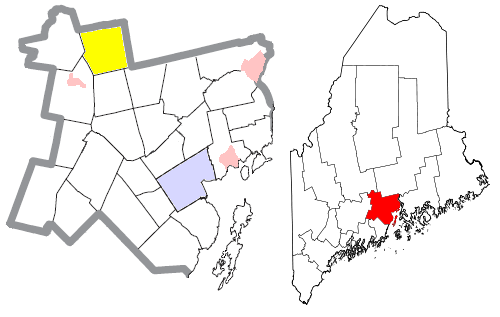
- Location of Troy (in yellow) in Waldo County and the state of Maine
- Coordinates: 44°40′46″N 69°14′16″W
- Country: United States
- State: Maine
- County: Waldo

Area
  - Total: 35.92 sq mi (93.03 km^{2})
  - Land: 34.92 sq mi (90.44 km^{2})
  - Water: 1.00 sq mi (2.59 km^{2})
- Elevation: 381 ft (116 m)

Population (2020)
  - Total: 1,018
  - Density: 29/sq mi (11.3/km^{2})
- Time zone: UTC-5 (Eastern (EST))
  - Summer (DST): UTC-4 (EDT)
- ZIP code: 04987
- Area code: 207
- FIPS code: 23-77625
- GNIS feature ID: 582769
- Website: troyme.org

Troy is a town in Waldo County, Maine, United States. The population was 1,018 at the 2020 census.

== History ==
Settled in approximately 1801 as Bridge's Plantation, it was incorporated as the Town of Kingville on February 22, 1812. The town's name was changed to Joy in 1815, Montgomery in 1826, and finally to Troy in 1826.

== Geography ==
According to the United States Census Bureau, the town has a total area of 35.92 square miles (93.03 km^{2}), of which 34.92 square miles (90.44 km^{2}) is land and 1.00 square mile (2.59 km^{2}) is water, chiefly Carlton Pond and bordering on Unity Pond.

Troy is served by U.S. Route 202 and Maine State Route 220. It is bordered by Detroit and Plymouth on the north, Dixmont on the east, Jackson on the southeast, Thorndike on the south, Unity on the southwest and Burnham on the west.

== Demographics ==
Historical population
Census	Pop.	Note	%±
1830	803		—
1840	1,375		71.2%
1850	1,484		7.9%
1860	1,403		−5.5%
1870	1,201		−14.4%
1880	1,059		−11.8%
1890	868		−18.0%
1900	766		−11.8%
1910	768		0.3%
1920	638		−16.9%
1930	651		2.0%
1940	582		−10.6%
1950	553		−5.0%
1960	469		−15.2%
1970	543		15.8%
1980	701		29.1%
1990	802		14.4%
2000	963		20.1%
2010	1,030		7.0%
2020	1,018		−1.2%
U.S. Decennial Census

=== 2010 census ===
As of the census of 2010, there were 1,030 people, 414 households, and 303 families living in the town. The population density was 29.5 inhabitants per square mile (11.4/km^{2}). There were 476 housing units at an average density of 13.6 per square mile (5.3/km^{2}). The racial makeup of the town was 95.6% White, 0.4% African American, 0.2% Native American, 0.2% Asian, and 3.6% from two or more races. Hispanic or Latino of any race were 1.6% of the population.

There were 414 households, of which 31.4% had children under the age of 18 living with them, 56.8% were married couples living together, 9.4% had a female householder with no husband present, 7.0% had a male householder with no wife present, and 26.8% were non-families. 19.1% of all households were made up of individuals, and 8.2% had someone living alone who was 65 years of age or older. The average household size was 2.49 and the average family size was 2.83.

The median age in the town was 43.1 years. 22.9% of residents were under the age of 18; 6.7% were between the ages of 18 and 24; 22.9% were from 25 to 44; 32% were from 45 to 64; and 15.4% were 65 years of age or older. The gender makeup of the town was 50.0% male and 50.0% female.

=== 2000 census ===
As of the census of 2000, there were 963 people, 365 households, and 274 families living in the town. The population density was 27.7 inhabitants per square mile (10.7/km^{2}). There were 420 housing units at an average density of 12.1 per square mile (4.7/km^{2}). The racial makeup of the town was 97.40% White, 0.83% Native American, 0.31% Asian, and 1.45% from two or more races. Hispanic or Latino of any race were 0.10% of the population.

There were 365 households, out of which 33.4% had children under the age of 18 living with them, 62.7% were married couples living together, 6.8% had a female householder with no husband present, and 24.7% were non-families. 18.1% of all households were made up of individuals, and 6.3% had someone living alone who was 65 years of age or older. The average household size was 2.64 and the average family size was 2.96.

In the town, the population was spread out, with 27.3% under the age of 18, 6.3% from 18 to 24, 28.0% from 25 to 44, 26.8% from 45 to 64, and 11.5% who were 65 years of age or older. The median age was 38 years. For every 100 females, there were 103.2 males. For every 100 females age 18 and over, there were 100.6 males.

The median income for a household in the town was $30,052, and the median income for a family was $34,375. Males had a median income of $26,250 versus $21,438 for females. The per capita income for the town was $14,027. About 8.3% of families and 13.7% of the population were below the poverty line, including 21.7% of those under age 18 and 7.9% of those age 65 or over.
