= Otter Tail Valley Railroad =

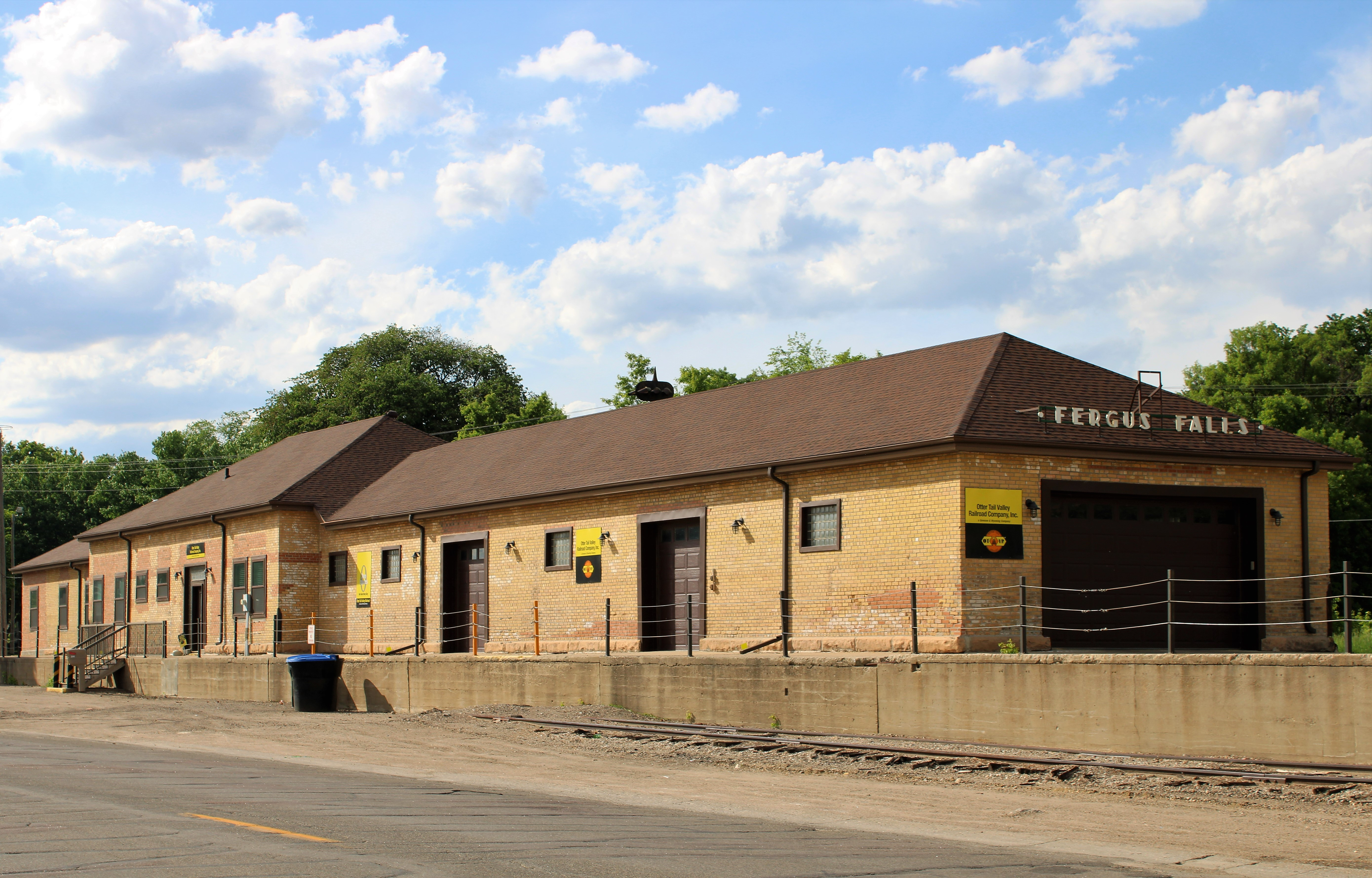
- Fergus Falls station

Overview
- Parent company: Genesee and Wyoming
- Headquarters: Fergus Falls, Minnesota
- Reporting mark: OTVR
- Locale: Minnesota
- Dates of operation: 1986–present

Technical
- Track gauge: 4 ft 8 1/2 in (1,435 mm) standard gauge
- Length: 74 miles (119 km)

Other
- Website: www.gwrr.com/otvr/

The Otter Tail Valley Railroad (reporting mark OTVR) is a Class III railroad operating 74 miles (119 km) of track between Moorhead, Minnesota, and Fergus Falls, Minnesota, and short branch lines from Fergus Falls to French and from Fergus Falls to Hoot Lake.

== History ==
The railroad began operations in 1986 on former Burlington Northern, ex Great Northern Railway track between Moorhead and Avon, Minnesota, interchanging with Burlington Northern. The railroad abandoned the 96 miles (154 km) of track between Avon and Fergus Falls in February 1991.

In 2008, the railroad handled approximately 10,000 carloads, principally outbound grain and inbound coal.

Otter Tail Valley Railroad is owned by Genesee & Wyoming, having been acquired in 2012. As of 2023, OTVR can hold up to 286,000 pounds of supplies.
