= Clinton, Maine =

Town in Maine, United States

- Town
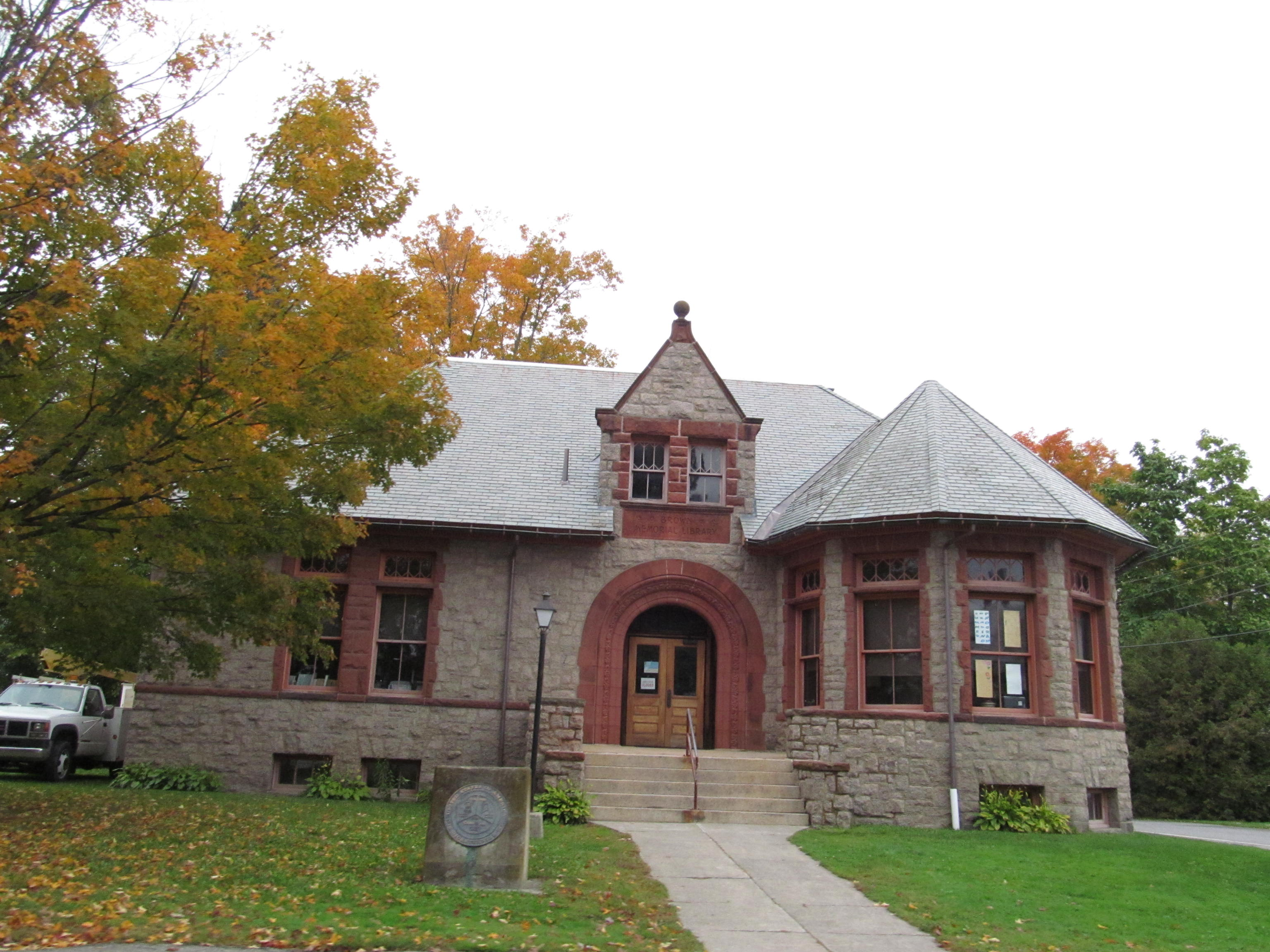
- Brown Memorial Library, Clinton, Maine

- Seal
- Motto: "Dairy Capital of Maine"
- Location in Kennebec County and the state of Maine
- Coordinates: 44°39′30″N 69°32′10″W
- Country: United States
- State: Maine
- County: Kennebec
- Villages: Clinton; Morrison Corner

Area
  - Total: 44.79 sq mi (116.01 km^{2})
  - Land: 43.87 sq mi (113.62 km^{2})
  - Water: 0.92 sq mi (2.38 km^{2})
- Elevation: 259 ft (79 m)

Population (2020)
  - Total: 3,370
  - Density: 77/sq mi (29.7/km^{2})
- Time zone: UTC-5 (Eastern (EST))
  - Summer (DST): UTC-4 (EDT)
- ZIP Code: 04927
- Area code: Area code
- GNIS feature ID: 582412
- Website: www.clinton-me.us

Clinton is a town in Kennebec County, Maine, United States. The town was apparently named after Revolutionary War General, and U.S. vice president, George Clinton. The population was 3,370 at the 2020 census. The main village in town is the Clinton census-designated place, with a population of 1,386 at the 2020 census.

== Geography ==
According to the United States Census Bureau, the town has a total area of 44.79 square miles (116.01 km^{2}), of which 43.87 square miles (113.62 km^{2}) is land and 0.92 square miles (2.38 km^{2}) is water.

The town is bordered by Skowhegan and Canaan on the north, Pittsfield on the northeast, Burnham on the east, Benton on the south and Fairfield on the west. It is the northernmost town in Kennebec County: towns to the west and north are in Somerset County, while Waldo County is to the east.

Clinton is crossed by Interstate 95, SR 11, SR 100 and SR 23. The village of Clinton is in the southeast part of the town, on the north side of the Sebasticook River, a southwest-flowing tributary of the Kennebec River.

== Demographics ==
Historical population
Census	Pop.	Note	%±
1800	533		—
1810	1,050		97.0%
1820	1,356		29.1%
1830	2,124		56.6%
1840	2,818		32.7%
1850	1,743		−38.1%
1860	1,803		3.4%
1870	1,766		−2.1%
1880	1,665		−5.7%
1890	1,518		−8.8%
1900	1,398		−7.9%
1910	1,268		−9.3%
1920	1,230		−3.0%
1930	1,354		10.1%
1940	1,436		6.1%
1950	1,623		13.0%
1960	1,729		6.5%
1970	1,971		14.0%
1980	2,696		36.8%
1990	3,312		22.8%
2000	3,340		0.8%
2010	3,486		4.4%
2020	3,370		−3.3%
U.S. Decennial Census

=== 2010 census ===
As of the census of 2010, there were 3,486 people, 1,412 households, and 962 families living in the town. The population density was 79.5 inhabitants per square mile (30.7/km^{2}). There were 1,547 housing units at an average density of 35.3 per square mile (13.6/km^{2}). The racial makeup of the town was 97.1% White, 0.4% African American, 0.6% Native American, 0.1% Asian, 0.5% from other races, and 1.2% from two or more races. Hispanic or Latino of any race were 1.1% of the population.

There were 1,412 households, of which 32.3% had children under the age of 18 living with them, 52.8% were married couples living together, 10.3% had a female householder with no husband present, 5.0% had a male householder with no wife present, and 31.9% were non-families. 24.4% of all households were made up of individuals, and 8.2% had someone living alone who was 65 years of age or older. The average household size was 2.47 and the average family size was 2.88.

The median age in the town was 40.5 years. 22.9% of residents were under the age of 18; 7.9% were between the ages of 18 and 24; 26.1% were from 25 to 44; 31.1% were from 45 to 64; and 12.2% were 65 years of age or older. The gender makeup of the town was 51.1% male and 48.9% female.

=== 2000 census ===
As of the census of 2000, there were 3,340 people, 1,278 households, and 953 families living in the town. The population density was 76.1 inhabitants per square mile (29.4/km^{2}). There were 1,409 housing units at an average density of 32.1 per square mile (12.4/km^{2}). The racial makeup of the town was 98.08% White, 0.12% Black or African American, 0.21% Native American, 0.06% Asian, 0.18% from other races, and 1.35% from two or more races. Hispanic or Latino of any race were 0.96% of the population.

There were 1,278 households, out of which 36.0% had children under the age of 18 living with them, 59.2% were married couples living together, 9.2% had a female householder with no husband present, and 25.4% were non-families. 19.0% of all households were made up of individuals, and 6.8% had someone living alone who was 65 years of age or older. The average household size was 2.61 and the average family size was 2.95.

In the town, the population was spread out, with 26.6% under the age of 18, 8.8% from 18 to 24, 30.4% from 25 to 44, 24.7% from 45 to 64, and 9.5% who were 65 years of age or older. The median age was 36 years. For every 100 females, there were 101.0 males. For every 100 females age 18 and over, there were 97.4 males.

The median income for a household in the town was $32,419, and the median income for a family was $37,652. Males had a median income of $28,667 versus $21,051 for females. The per capita income for the town was $15,052. About 10.1% of families and 13.0% of the population were below the poverty line, including 16.3% of those under age 18 and 6.6% of those age 65 or over.

== Industry ==
Clinton is the dairy capital of Maine, with 13% of milk production coming from seven farms consisting of 3,778 acres.

Fedco Seeds is headquartered in Clinton.

== History ==
The Town of Clinton was incorporated in 1795, within the Commonwealth of Massachusetts; and, later became Clinton, Maine, on March 15, 1820, when the State of Maine was accepted as a State within the United States of America.

The Town was apparently named after Revolutionary War General, and U.S. vice president, George Clinton. (Note: the Town is not named for Dewitt Clinton, who was born in 1769 and attained his first elective office in the New York state legislature in 1799, several years before becoming New York's governor).
