= Palermo, Maine =

- Town
- Seal

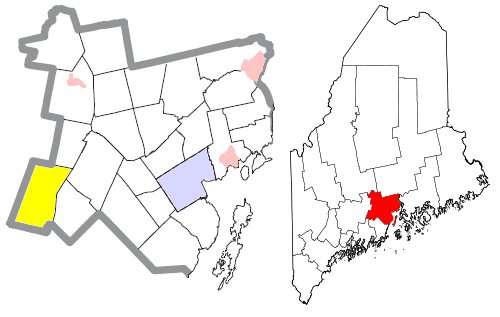
- Location of Palermo (in yellow) in Waldo County and the state of Maine
- Coordinates: 44°22′39″N 69°26′42″W
- Country: United States
- State: Maine
- County: Waldo

Area
  - Total: 43.57 sq mi (112.85 km^{2})
  - Land: 40.56 sq mi (105.05 km^{2})
  - Water: 3.01 sq mi (7.80 km^{2})
- Elevation: 486 ft (148 m)

Population (2020)
  - Total: 1,570
  - Density: 39/sq mi (14.9/km^{2})
- Time zone: UTC-5 (Eastern (EST))
  - Summer (DST): UTC-4 (EDT)
- ZIP code: 04354
- Area code: 207
- FIPS code: 23-56450
- GNIS feature ID: 582659
- Website: www.townofpalermo.org

Palermo is a town in Waldo County, Maine, United States. The population was 1,570 at the 2020 census. Palermo is included in the Augusta, Maine, micropolitan New England City and Town Area.

== Geography ==
According to the United States Census Bureau, the town has a total area of 43.57 square miles (112.85 km^{2}), of which 40.56 square miles (105.05 km^{2}) is land and 3.01 square miles (7.80 km^{2}) is water, chiefly Sheepscot Pond. Other ponds include: Branch Pond (310 acres), Beech Pond (59 acres), Jump Pond (51 acres), Belden Pond (24 acres), Foster (Crotch) Pond (32 acres), Bowler (Belton) Pond (35 acres), Chisholm Pond (42 acres) and Turner Pond (199 acres).

Palermo is bordered by Albion and Freedom to the north, Montville and Liberty to the east, Somerville and Washington to the south and China to the west. The town is served by Route 3.

== Demographics ==
Historical population
Census	Pop.	Note	%±
1810	761		—
1820	1,056		38.8%
1830	1,257		19.0%
1840	1,594		26.8%
1850	1,659		4.1%
1860	1,372		−17.3%
1870	1,223		−10.9%
1880	1,118		−8.6%
1890	887		−20.7%
1900	757		−14.7%
1910	690		−8.9%
1920	567		−17.8%
1930	513		−9.5%
1940	527		2.7%
1950	511		−3.0%
1960	528		3.3%
1970	645		22.2%
1980	760		17.8%
1990	1,021		34.3%
2000	1,220		19.5%
2010	1,535		25.8%
2020	1,570		2.3%
U.S. Decennial Census

=== 2010 census ===
As of the census of 2010, there were 1,535 people, 623 households, and 461 families living in the town. The population density was 37.8 inhabitants per square mile (14.6/km^{2}). There were 975 housing units at an average density of 24.0 per square mile (9.3/km^{2}). The racial makeup of the town was 97.5% White, 0.5% African American, 0.4% Native American, 0.5% Asian, 0.1% from other races, and 1.1% from two or more races. Hispanic or Latino of any race were 0.5% of the population.

There were 623 households, of which 30.8% had children under the age of 18 living with them, 58.6% were married couples living together, 10.6% had a female householder with no husband present, 4.8% had a male householder with no wife present, and 26.0% were non-families. 19.3% of all households were made up of individuals, and 8.2% had someone living alone who was 65 years of age or older. The average household size was 2.46 and the average family size was 2.78.

The median age in the town was 43.8 years. 22.5% of residents were under the age of 18; 7% were between the ages of 18 and 24; 22% were from 25 to 44; 32.7% were from 45 to 64; and 15.8% were 65 years of age or older. The gender makeup of the town was 49.7% male and 50.3% female.

=== 2000 census ===
As of the census of 2000, there were 1,220 people, 491 households, and 363 families living in the town. The population density was 30.1 inhabitants per square mile (11.6/km^{2}). There were 789 housing units at an average density of 19.5 per square mile (7.5/km^{2}). The racial makeup of the town was 97.70% White, 0.33% African American, 0.41% Native American, 0.33% Asian, and 1.23% from two or more races. Hispanic or Latino of any race were 0.25% of the population.

There were 491 households, out of which 29.1% had children under the age of 18 living with them, 62.1% were married couples living together, 7.1% had a female householder with no husband present, and 25.9% were non-families. 20.0% of all households were made up of individuals, and 5.5% had someone living alone who was 65 years of age or older. The average household size was 2.48 and the average family size was 2.84.

In the town, the population was spread out, with 24.5% under the age of 18, 4.5% from 18 to 24, 30.3% from 25 to 44, 28.0% from 45 to 64, and 12.7% who were 65 years of age or older. The median age was 40 years. For every 100 females, there were 101.7 males. For every 100 females age 18 and over, there were 105.6 males.

The median income for a household in the town was $34,375, and the median income for a family was $37,431. Males had a median income of $29,464 versus $23,365 for females. The per capita income for the town was $17,827. About 15.6% of families and 18.2% of the population were below the poverty line, including 26.0% of those under age 18 and 7.9% of those age 65 or over.

== Education ==
Palermo is part of the Sheepscot Valley Regional School Unit.

The school district's website is http://www.svrsu.org/.

Palermo's elementary school (K–8th) is Palermo Consolidated School. This school usually has about 140 students.

Most children from Palermo Consolidated School continue their education at Erskine Academy in South China, Maine.

== Notable people ==
- Frank P. Bennett, Jr. (1878–1965), was an American politician, banker, and editor.
- John Bunker, (born 1950 or 1951), is an American orchardist, pomologist, and apple expert.
- Harry Vaughn Cail (1913–2008), was an American sport shooter.
- Martin Greeley (1814–1899), was an American farmer and politician.
- Daniel Darwin Pratt (1813–1877), was a United States Senator from Indiana.
- Katrina Smith, (born 1973 or 1974), state legislator
