= USS Moosehead =

USS Moosehead has been the name of more than one United States Navy ship, and may refer to:

- USS Moosehead (ID-2047), steamer commissioned in 1918, redesignated YFB-2047 and renamed USS Porpoise in 1920, and stricken in 1930
- USS Turner (DD-259), a destroyer in commission from 1919 to 1922 which became the water barge YW-56 in 1936, was recommissioned as the auxiliary ship USS Moosehead (IX-98) in 1943, and was decommissioned in 1946.

== See also ==
- USS Moose
- USS Moosbrugger (DD-980)
