= Common Ground Country Fair =

Agricultural Fair in Maine

Coordinates: 44.590°N 69.291°W

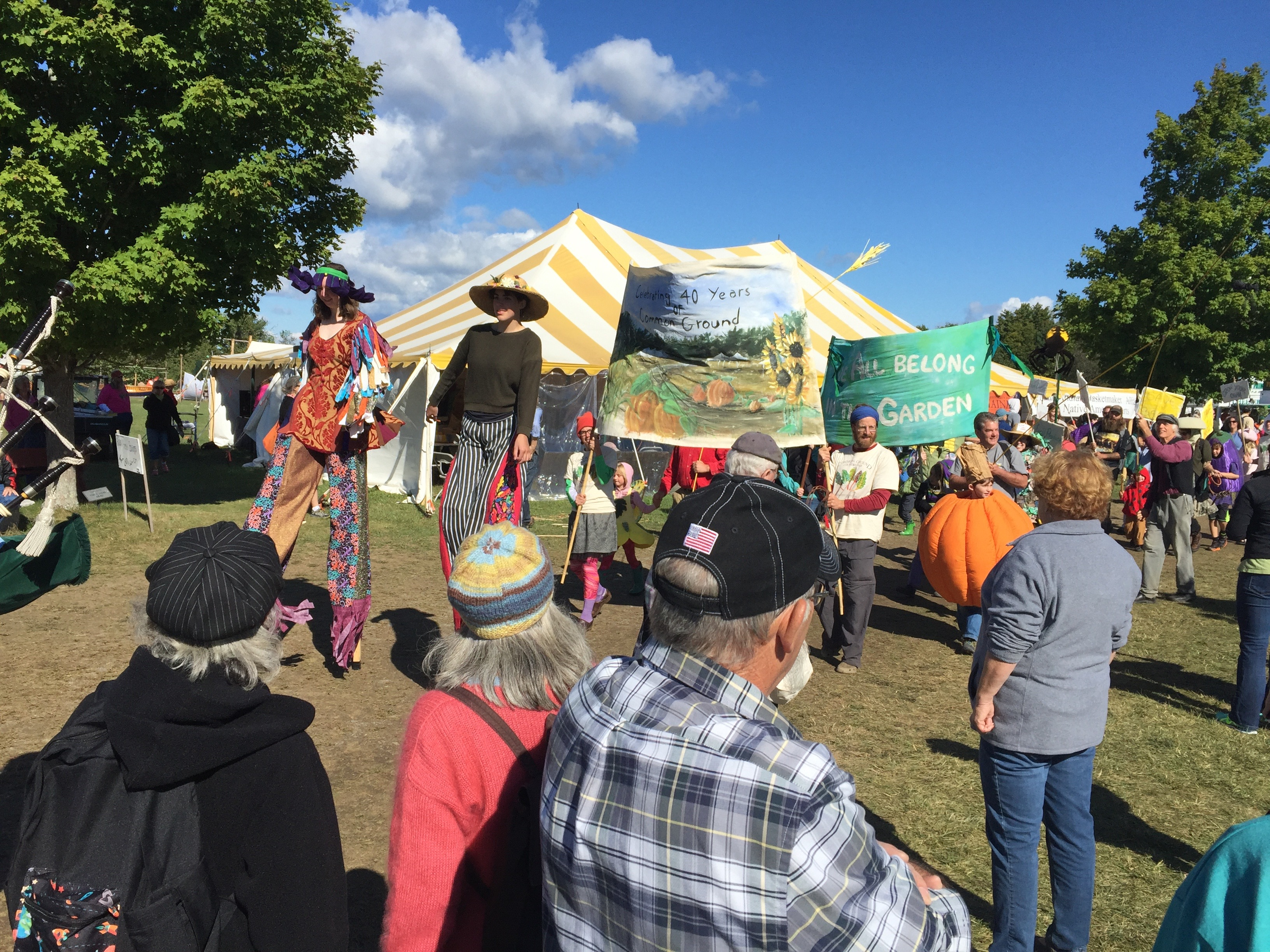
The children's vegetable parade happens each day of the fair.

The Common Ground Country Fair, also known as the Common Ground Fair, is an agricultural fair in Unity, Maine held the third weekend after Labor Day and sponsored by the Maine Organic Farmers and Gardeners Association (MOFGA). It is held at the Common Ground Education Center. It was first held in 1977. The fair "celebrates organic living, farming and growing," and all the food sold at the event must be organic. The fair regularly hosts 50,000 to 60,000 people.

== History ==
The fair began in 1977 in Litchfield, Maine. In 1981, it moved to Windsor, Maine and in 1996, MOFGA purchased 200 acres in Unity, Maine, where the fair now takes place yearly.

The first fair was held at the Litchfield Fairgrounds as a fundraiser for MOFGA. It raised $22,000. In 2016, a Portland Press Herald article about the fair's history said:

A very small item about the first Common Ground Country Fair ran in the Portland Press Herald on Sept. 2, 1977 under the headline “Fair to Have Extra Features.” The “few touches” that would make the fair “a cut above the traditional” were “a roster of speakers that includes Helen and Scott Nearing, renowned homesteaders and authors.” The story is 102 words long, which suggests that editors at the Press Herald had limited expectations for the future of the Common Ground Country Fair.

In the Nov.-Dec. 1977 Maine Organic Farmer & Gardner magazine, Lloyd Ferris wrote:

The Common Ground Country Fair was really too big to define in words. One is left with a lot of pleasant memory pictures; a lot of good thoughts. I will never forget, for instance, that incredible tent that looked a bit like an Egyptian pyramid or a star. And what food there was beneath it: The Strong Brothers’ egg rolls for which people lined up 50 deep, the Hungry Hunza sandwiches loaded with cheeses and sprouts and other good things, Mary’s home-made ice cream with hot apples, Krystina’s delightful bakery goods and that fine swichel (if I’m spelling it right) cooked up by the Sagadahoc County Chapter of MOFGA. It was a kind of hot cider mixture, they told me, consumed by workers long ago during haying season.

In 1989, Hurricane Hugo flooded the fairgrounds and delayed the Saturday opening.

In 2008, MOFGA installed water bottle filling stations to test the viability of no longer offering the sale of bottled water. The test run was deemed a success and the sale and use of bottled water wasn't offered the following year.

Coffee sales were not offered at the fair for many decades. By 2011 vendors could sell organic, fair-trade coffee.

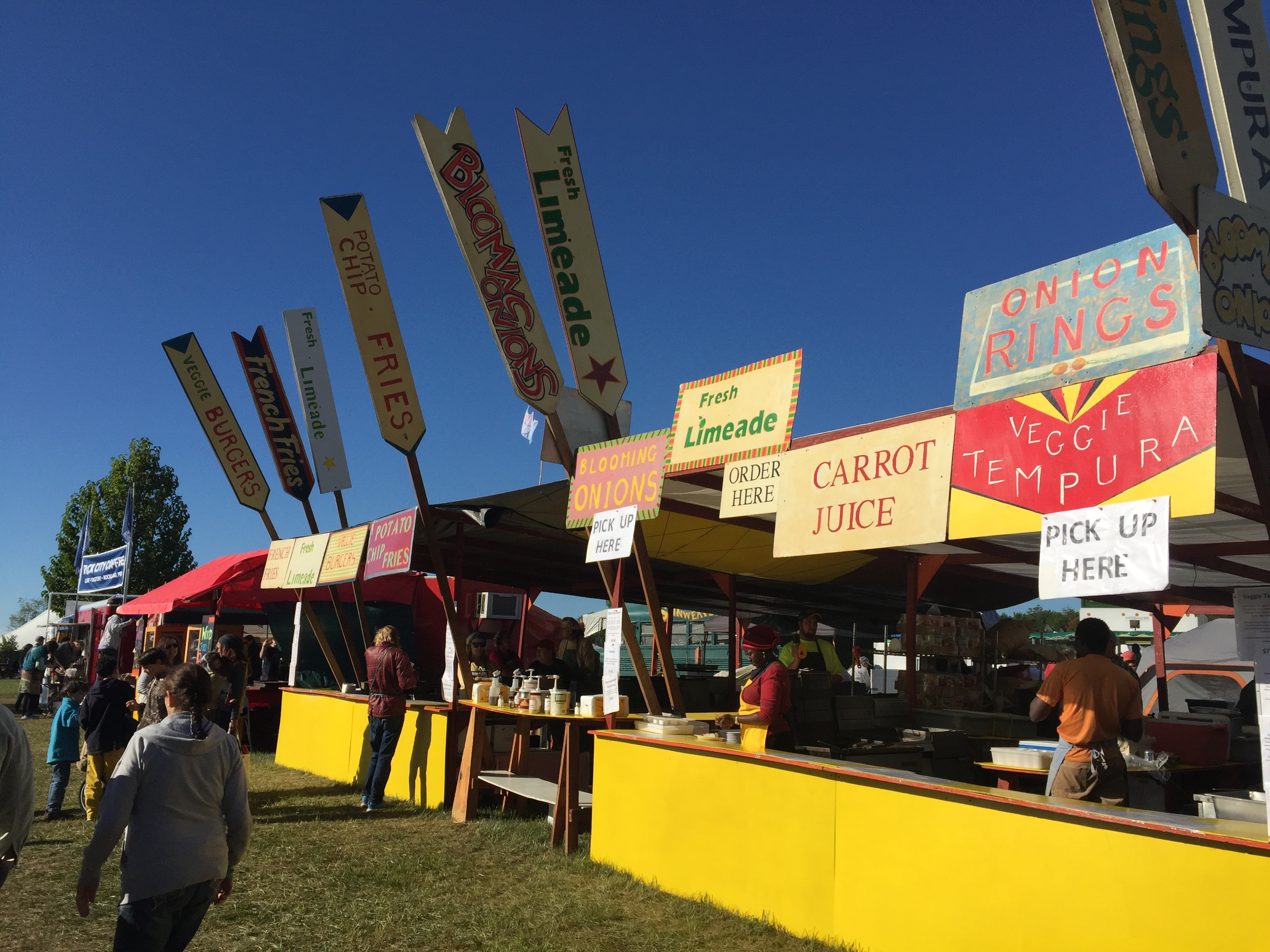
The two food courts only serve organic food.

For the first time in 2017, the fair was powered entirely by alternative sources, including a 102-Kilowatt solar array, a series of heat pumps and a small wind turbine.

In May 2020, MOFGA announced the fair wouldn't take place for the first time since its inception due to the COVID-19 pandemic. Fair director April Bouchard said in a statement the cancellation "allows us to begin planning a marquee virtual event."

Turnout for the fair had been falling in the years before the Covid pandemic, but has since rebounded and reached an all-time high of more than 70,000 attendees in 2024.

== Fair atmosphere ==
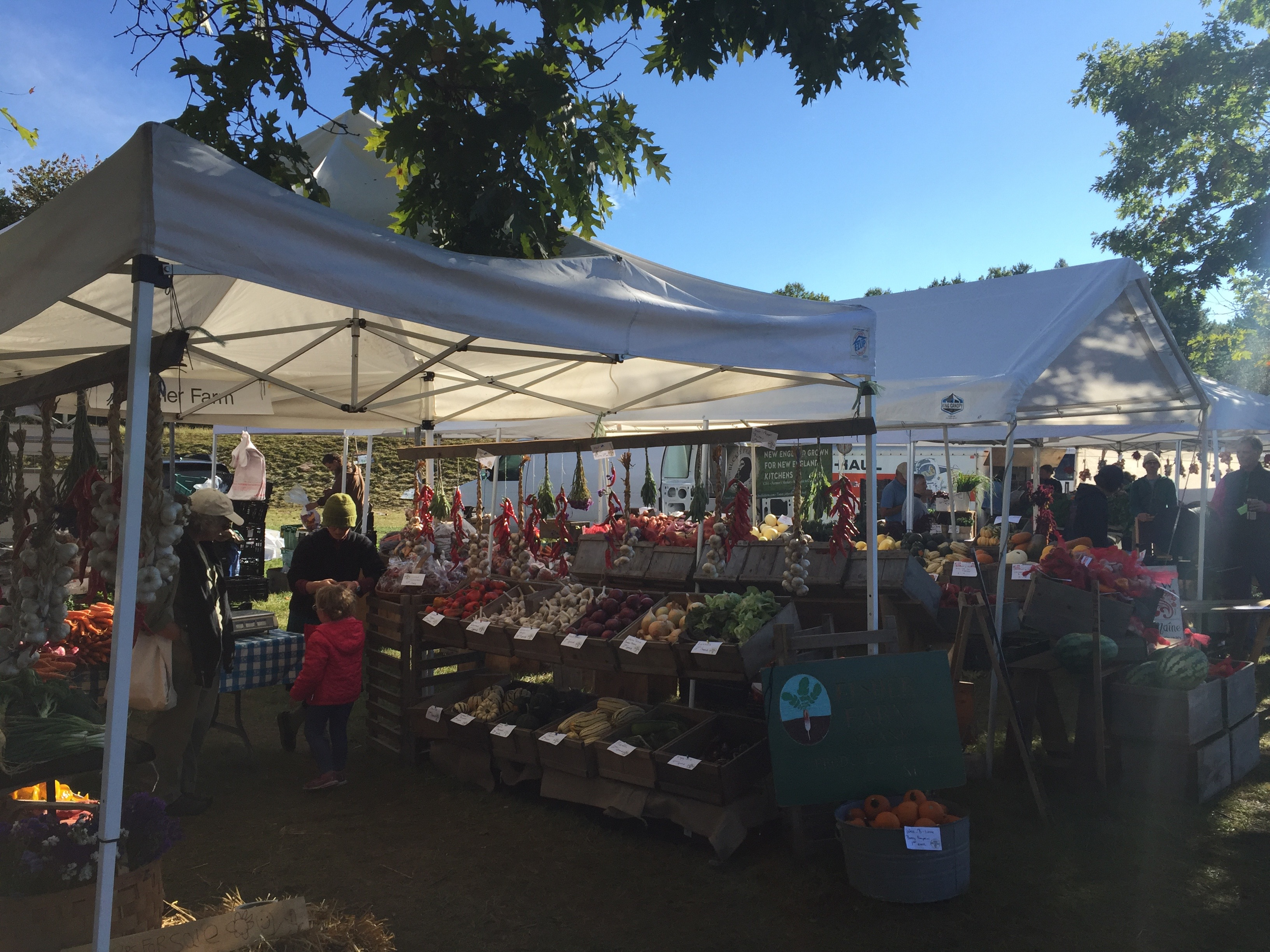
A farmers' market greets visitors at each of the two fairground entrances.

The fair commonly features traditional skills demonstrations, alternative energy demonstrations, handicraft vendors, farmers markets, and food courts selling a range of organic foods.

The fair is also host to a large number of political groups and activists. In 2009, there were 64 political or social activism groups in attendance.

In 2012, Anne Raver of The New York Times visited the fair and wrote: "The fair is a grand celebration not only for organic growers, but also for spinners and weavers; woodworkers and jewelry-makers; drovers of oxen, horses and mules; and sheep herders and their dogs. Not to mention poets and fiddlers, reflexologists and herbalists, solar and wind power gurus, seed savers and worm-keepers." The Times also noted: "It wasn’t the toasty smell of cotton candy that filled the air; it was the fruity fragrance of sweet Annie (Artemisia annua), a European herb that can self-seed in the garden like an invading army. Women old and young wore golden crowns of it on their heads."

In 2013, the Portland Press Herald reported: "Instead of the typical fair staples such as cotton candy and carnival rides, the Common Ground Country Fair draws crowds seeking veggie burgers and workshops on worm composting."

The fair is known for its numerous vegetarian, vegan and gluten-free options. Vegan columnist Avery Yale Kamila wrote in 2014: "for vegetarians there is no contest when it comes to the agricultural event with the largest selection of meat-free options. The Common Ground Country Fair wins the blue ribbon for consistent veg-friendliness year after year."

The Maine Campus newspaper wrote in 2019 the fair "has significantly more vegan and vegetarian options than an average fair."

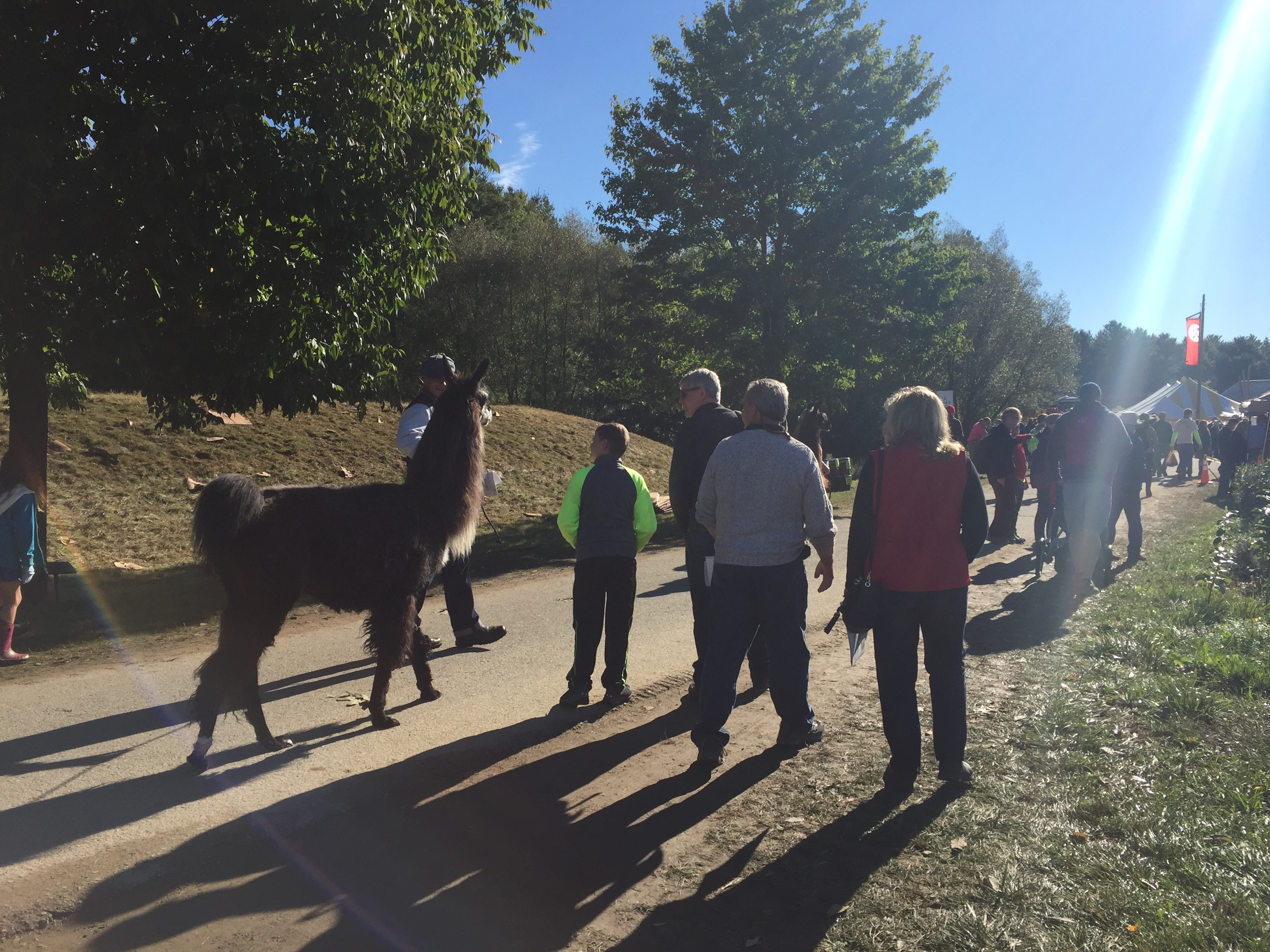
An alpaca strolls with visitors at the 2016 fair.

== Keynote speakers ==
Each day of the fair features one keynote address plus hundreds of other speeches, talks, panel discussions, demonstrations and other educational events. Some past keynote addresses at the Common Ground Country Fair were delivered by: Wendell Berry, Scott Nearing, Helen Nearing, Elliot Coleman, Vandana Shiva, Will Bonsall, Kent Whealy, Jim Hightower, Ross Gelbspan, Percy Schmeiser.

== Poster art & competition ==
MOFGA holds an annual competition for the artwork to be featured on the next year's fair poster and merchandise. Maine residents and MOFGA members can enter the contest. In 1987, the featured artwork was from Dahlov Ipcar. The 2011 poster was a still life oil painting of canned goods by Dacia Klinkerch. In 2014, Kate Seaver's medicinal herb drawing won the competition. The 2018 poster was a painting of two kunekune pigs by Arika von Edler, who painted them to highlight livestock not being raised for meat.
