= Burnham, Maine =

Town in Maine, United States

- Town
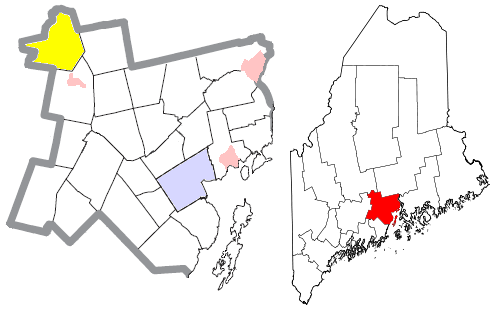
- Location of Burnham (in yellow) in Waldo County and the state of Maine
- Coordinates: 44°43′18″N 69°22′05″W
- Country: United States
- State: Maine
- County: Waldo

Area
  - Total: 41.22 sq mi (106.76 km^{2})
  - Land: 38.89 sq mi (100.72 km^{2})
  - Water: 2.33 sq mi (6.03 km^{2})
- Elevation: 197 ft (60 m)

Population (2020)
  - Total: 1,096
  - Density: 28/sq mi (10.9/km^{2})
- Time zone: UTC-5 (Eastern (EST))
  - Summer (DST): UTC-4 (EDT)
- ZIP code: 04922
- Area code: 207
- FIPS code: 23-09270
- GNIS feature ID: 582379
- Website: burnham-maine.us

Burnham is a town in Waldo County, Maine, United States. The population was 1,096 at the 2020 census.

== Geography ==
According to the United States Census Bureau, the town has a total area of 41.22 square miles (106.76 km^{2}), of which 38.89 square miles (100.72 km^{2}) is land and 2.33 square miles (6.03 km^{2}) is water, chiefly Unity Pond. The town is drained by Twentyfive Mile Stream and the Sebasticook River.

Burnham is crossed by Interstate 95, Maine State Route 11 and 100. The town is bordered by Pittsfield on the north, Detroit on the northeast, Troy on the east, Unity and Unity Township on the south and Clinton on the west.

== Demographics ==
Historical population
| Census | Pop. | Note | %± |
|---|---|---|---|
| 1830 | 409 | | — |
| 1840 | 602 | | 47.2% |
| 1850 | 784 | | 30.2% |
| 1860 | 857 | | 9.3% |
| 1870 | 788 | | −8.1% |
| 1880 | 967 | | 22.7% |
| 1890 | 846 | | −12.5% |
| 1900 | 766 | | −9.5% |
| 1910 | 733 | | −4.3% |
| 1920 | 643 | | −12.3% |
| 1930 | 664 | | 3.3% |
| 1940 | 643 | | −3.2% |
| 1950 | 706 | | 9.8% |
| 1960 | 755 | | 6.9% |
| 1970 | 802 | | 6.2% |
| 1980 | 951 | | 18.6% |
| 1990 | 961 | | 1.1% |
| 2000 | 1,142 | | 18.8% |
| 2010 | 1,164 | | 1.9% |
| 2020 | 1,096 | | −5.8% |
U.S. Decennial Census

=== 2010 census ===
As of the census of 2010, there were 1,164 people, 502 households, and 332 families living in the town. The population density was 29.9 inhabitants per square mile (11.5/km^{2}). There were 714 housing units at an average density of 18.4 per square mile (7.1/km^{2}). The racial makeup of the town was 98.4% White, 0.2% African American, 0.2% Native American, 0.2% Asian, 0.1% from other races, and 1.0% from two or more races. Hispanic or Latino of any race were 0.3% of the population.

There were 502 households, of which 28.5% had children under the age of 18 living with them, 48.8% were married couples living together, 10.2% had a female householder with no husband present, 7.2% had a male householder with no wife present, and 33.9% were non-families. 27.1% of all households were made up of individuals, and 9% had someone living alone who was 65 years of age or older. The average household size was 2.32 and the average family size was 2.75.

The median age in the town was 43.3 years. 20.5% of residents were under the age of 18; 9.5% were between the ages of 18 and 24; 22.3% were from 25 to 44; 33.7% were from 45 to 64; and 13.9% were 65 years of age or older. The gender makeup of the town was 52.3% male and 47.7% female.

=== 2000 census ===
As of the census of 2000, there were 1,142 people, 442 households, and 326 families living in the town. The population density was 29.3 inhabitants per square mile (11.3/km^{2}). There were 649 housing units at an average density of 16.7 per square mile (6.4/km^{2}). The racial makeup of the town was 96.85% White, 0.18% African American, 0.44% Native American, 0.09% Asian, 0.53% from other races, and 1.93% from two or more races. Hispanic or Latino of any race were 0.35% of the population.

There were 442 households, out of which 34.4% had children under the age of 18 living with them, 59.5% were married couples living together, 9.0% had a female householder with no husband present, and 26.2% were non-families. 20.6% of all households were made up of individuals, and 7.0% had someone living alone who was 65 years of age or older. The average household size was 2.58 and the average family size was 2.97.

In the town, the population was spread out, with 26.4% under the age of 18, 7.4% from 18 to 24, 28.8% from 25 to 44, 26.6% from 45 to 64, and 10.8% who were 65 years of age or older. The median age was 37 years. For every 100 females, there were 103.2 males. For every 100 females age 18 and over, there were 103.1 males.

The median income for a household in the town was $31,071, and the median income for a family was $33,580. Males had a median income of $23,828 versus $21,053 for females. The per capita income for the town was $14,030. About 13.8% of families and 16.0% of the population were below the poverty line, including 23.3% of those under age 18 and 7.8% of those age 65 or over.
