= Maine Organic Farmers and Gardeners Association =

- Abbreviation: MOFGA
- Formation: 1971
- Location: Unity, Maine
- Region served: Maine
- Website: http://www.mofga.org/

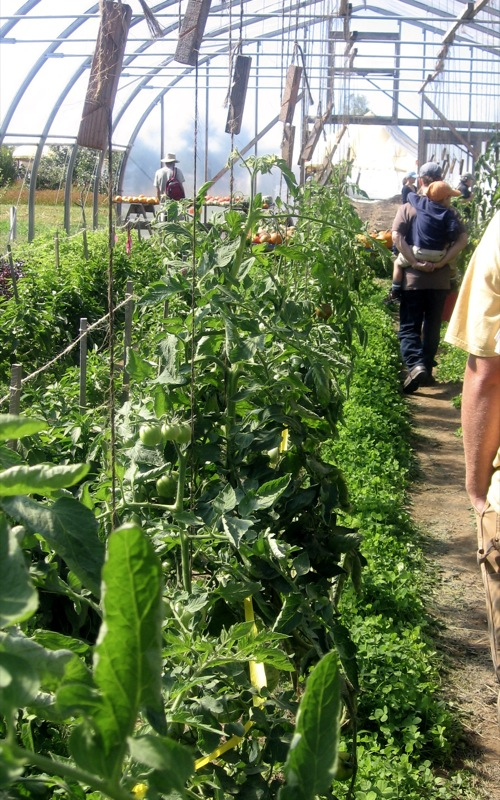
MOFGA Greenhouse

The Maine Organic Farmers and Gardeners Association (MOFGA) certifies organic food and products throughout the State of Maine. It is a voluntary organization whose office is located in Unity, Maine. As of 2016, MOFGA certifies 480 producers and growers.

MOFGA also offers workshops and trainings related to organic agriculture, and organizes the annual Common Ground Country Fair.

Formed in 1971, MOFGA is one of the largest, and oldest, state organic associations in the United States. Currently MOFGA has two active satellite chapters located in Penobscot and Sagadahoc, although members live in every county of Maine as well as many other states.

== History ==
MOFGA was founded in 1971 following the evolution of the preceding organization, Maine Organic Foods Association (MOFA).

== Membership ==
The Maine Organic Farmers and Gardeners Association comprises over 7,000 members and more than 2,000 volunteers.

== Events ==
MOFGA plays host to numerous events throughout the calendar year ranging from workshops to gatherings. Perhaps the most well-known event is the annual Common Ground Country Fair held in Unity, Maine.

== Programs ==
MOFGA offers a number of forestry and organic agricultural programs including a farm apprentice program and an organic certification program. MOFGA is also associated with the Maine School Garden Network, a non-profit education agricultural program for student youth focused on sustainability and stewardship, and oversees the Russell Libby Agricultural Scholar Award, named after the late Russell Libby, MOFGA’s executive director from 1995 to 2012.

=== Buy Maine Organic Program ===
A program centered around encouraging organic practice in both consumption and production of agricultural goods and related products. At present, MOFGA certifies over 500 producers of organic goods, including those of each of Maine’s 15 counties.

=== Farm beginnings ===
A program geared towards supporting entry-level farmers towards a sustainable farm business with a focus on sustainability through workshops and mentoring. The MOFGA Farm Beginnings program is affiliated with The Farm Beginnings Collaborative, a national collective consisting of independent regional groups of farms and farmers.

=== Farm Apprenticeships ===
A program offering farm apprenticeship for individuals interested in organic farming. Applicants are paired with experienced farmers and often exchange their labor for the training and room board.

Current labor laws leave in question the legality of labor-exchange programs like MOFGA’s apprentice program. However, Maine’s economy has largely benefited from these and similar programs as they appear to be related to a growing interest and engagement in youth farming and an uptick in organic farms in Maine.

=== MOFGA Journey Person Program ===
A program aimed at training more experienced farmers in organic farming careers, the Journey Person program is designed to address and impart the skills and technical knowledge relevant to those individuals who have completed the farm apprenticeship program or have at least two years farming experience, one or more of which must be in Maine. In addition to offering training in organic farming, the program mentors individuals in business planning and finances.

=== Organic Farmer Loan Fund ===
MOFGA offers two types of loans for prospective borrowers intended to support organic farmers in establishing viable businesses and credit history with their businesses: The Business Loan Fund, and the Organic Farmer Loan Fund.

==== Business Loan Fund ====
The Business Loan Fund is tailored towards medium-sized businesses and smaller aiming to expand or support their business operations including marketing, non-production equipment, and working with or securing capital.

==== Organic Farmer Loan Fund ====
The Organic Farmer Loan Fund is a transitional assistance loan supporting farmers in converting to an organic farm through the securing of capital or equipment.

=== Russell Libby Agricultural Scholar Awards ===
An annual scholarship award named after the late executive director of MOFGA, Russell Libby, aimed at supporting those in the realm of sustainable farm practice and organic agriculture.

Three categories of scholarship are awarded each year for the following:

- MOFGA Journeyperson Program participant
- Maine High School Senior planning to study sustainable or organic farming at a college in Maine
- Kennebec Valley Community College student studying sustainable agriculture

=== Low Impact Forestry ===
A program supporting sustainable timber harvesting practice and use, the Low Impact Forestry (LIF) project of MOFGA offers events and workshops throughout the year. Following the 1997 purchase of 200 acres in Unity, Maine for a year round fairspace and headquarters for the association, MOFGA’s LIF program has worked to preserve and manage the forests on the land.

=== Maine School Garden Network ===
Maine School Garden Network (MSGN), a non-profit education agricultural program for student youth focused on sustainability and stewardship. Sponsored by MOFGA until 2014 when MSGN became an official 501(c)3 nonprofit organization, MSGN continues to partner with MOFGA to promote organic agricultural awareness and involvement in Maine’s youth through school programs throughout the year.

== Common Ground Education Center ==
The Common Ground Education Center is located on 300 organic acres of forest and farmland in Unity, Maine. It is the location of MOFGA's headquarters and the site of the Common Ground Country Fair. The property was acquired in 1998 and converted to organic demonstration fields, gardens, orchards, shade trees and low-impact forestry woodlots.

=== Maine Heritage Orchard ===
The Maine Heritage Orchard is a 10-acre orchard that preserves more than 360 varieties of apples and pears traditionally grown in Maine. It is used to teach organic orchard care. The orchard was planted in a reclaimed gravel pit starting in 2014.

== MOFGA Public Policy Initiatives ==
Pesticide Notification Registry.

== Publications ==
=== The Maine Organic Farmer & Gardener ===
A quarterly publication consisting of information related organic practice, sustainable farming, gardening, and agricultural pursuits, and commentary on social and political issues related to the effects of industrial agriculture. While the publication is available to its members and for sale on newsstands throughout the year, it sees its biggest circulation through the nexus of the annual Common Ground Fair gathering in the autumn reaching approximately 60,000.

== See also ==
- Organic certification
- Common Ground Country Fair
