= GE 70-ton switcher =

Model of diesel-electric locomotive

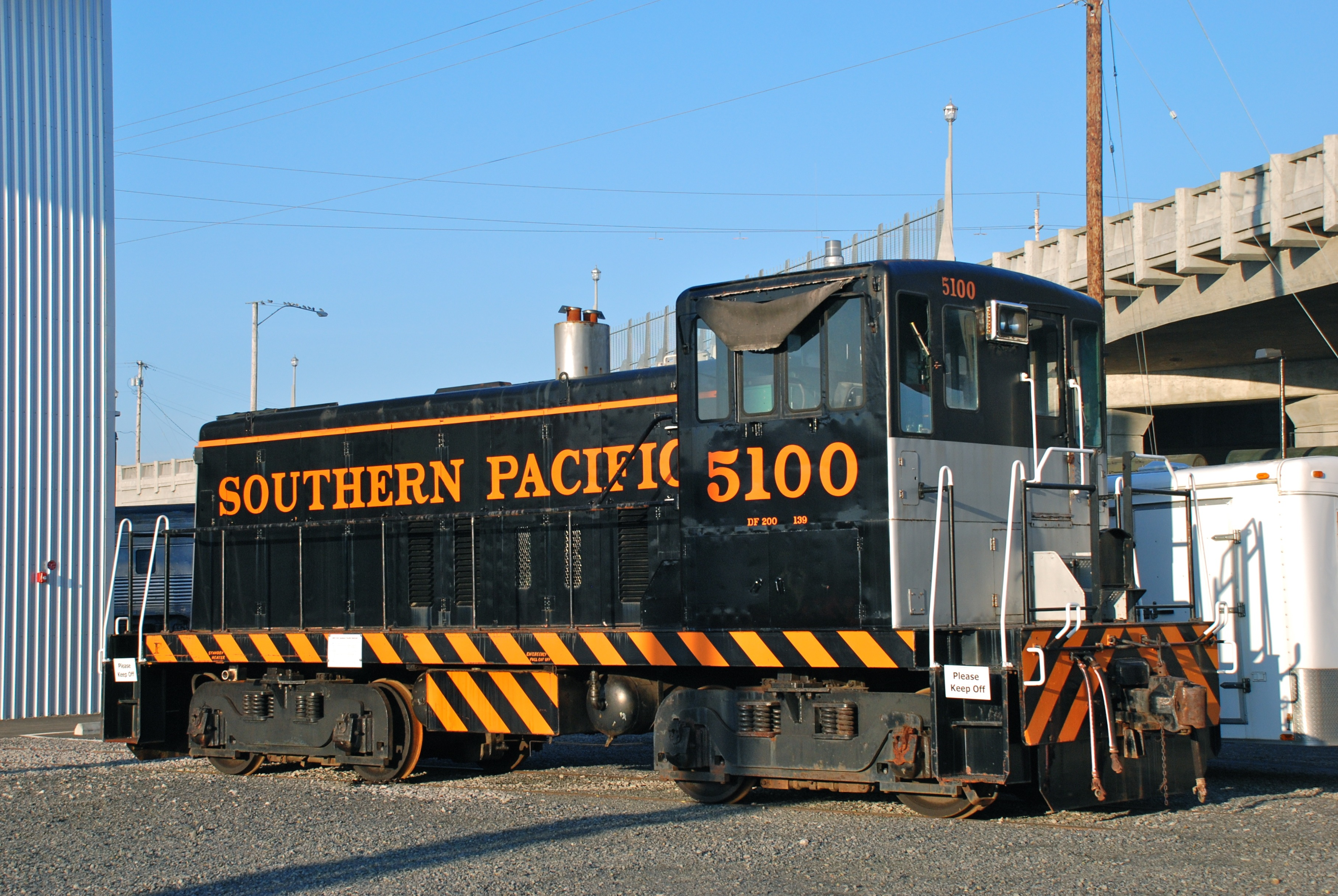
- Ex-Southern Pacific No. 5100 at the Oregon Rail Heritage Center, in Portland, Oregon, in 2013
Type and origin
- Power type: Diesel-electric
- Builder: GE Transportation Systems
- Model: 70-ton switcher
- Build date: January 1947–December 1955
- Total produced: 238
Specifications
- Configuration
  - AAR: B-B
  - UIC: Bo′Bo′
- Gauge: 4 ft 8 1/2 in (1,435 mm) standard gauge, (1,600 mm (5 ft 3 in) and 1,000 mm (3 ft 3 3/8 in) Brazil)
- Trucks: 4 wheel
- Length: 37 ft (11,278 mm)
- Width: 10 ft (3,048 mm)
- Height: 13 ft (3,962 mm)
- Loco weight: 130,000 lb (59,000 kg)
- Prime mover: Cooper-Bessemer FWL-6T
- RPM range: 450-1000
- Cylinders: 6
Performance figures
- Maximum speed: 60 mph (97 km/h)
- Power output: 500–660 hp (373–492 kW)
Career
- Locale: North America and Brazil

The GE 70-ton switcher is a 4-axle diesel-electric locomotive built by General Electric between about 1942 and 1955. It is classified as a B-B type locomotive. The first series of "70 tonners" were a group of seven center-cab locomotives built for the New York Central Railroad in November 1942. These units differ from the later end-cab versions. Locomotives exported to Brazil were known as GE 64T (70 short tons or 63 long tons or 64 metric tons) and nicknamed "scooters".

== Preservation ==
Rahway Valley 16 and 17, originally purchased by the Rahway Valley Railroad, headquartered in Kenilworth New Jersey. They were placed into service in 1951 and 1954, respectively, and operated through the closing of the shortline rail business in 1990. The two are now owned by the Tri-State Railway Historical Society, Boonton, NJ.

Frisco (St. Louis–San Francisco Railway) 70-ton #111 B&Y scheme at Heart of the Heartlands.

Baltimore & Annapolis Railroad No. 50 resides at the B&O Railroad Museum.

Southern Pacific 5100 resides at the Oregon Pacific Railroad in Portland, OR.

Southern Pacific 5103 resides on the Sumpter Valley Railway in McEwen, OR.

Southern Pacific 5119 resides at the Pacific Southwest Railway Museum in Campo, California. It is maintained in operational condition and is regularly used in excursion service over a section of the San Diego & Arizona Railway.

High Point, Thomasville & Denton Engine #202, a 1948 General Electric 70-ton, has been restored by a private owner and is currently used as one of two locomotives for a recreational railroad at Denton FarmPark in Denton, North Carolina.

A GE 70-ton in metric gauge and C-C trucks is in operation at the railway museum line of Brazilian Railway Preservation Association (ABPF) in Campinas - SP. It is painted in Mogiana Livery and carries ABPF Nº 03

Only one of the center-cab locomotives exists, former Ellwood Engineered Castings 6114B preserved by the Tod Engine Foundation in Youngstown, Ohio.
