= Fedco Seeds =

American seed company

- Industry: Agriculture
- Founded: 1978; 47 years ago
- Founder: C.R. Lawn
- Headquarters: Clinton, Maine, United States
- Website: fedcoseeds.com

Fedco Seeds is a seed company based in Clinton, Maine and founded by C.R. Lawn in 1978. The company is a major supplier of vegetable seeds in the United States, and specializes in varieties for northern growers and short growing seasons. They sell seeds, trees, and bulbs.

The Fedco catalog was founded during the Back-to-the-land movement, becoming a fixture in the movement's continuation.

Fedco Seeds is a cooperative owned 60% by customers and 40% by employees.

Fedco is a signatory of the "Safe Seed Pledge", which commits them to selling non GMO seed.

Lawn retired in 2018.

During the COVID-19 pandemic, Fedco saw a massive increase in sales during the 2020 and 2021 season.
