= Unity, Maine =

- Town
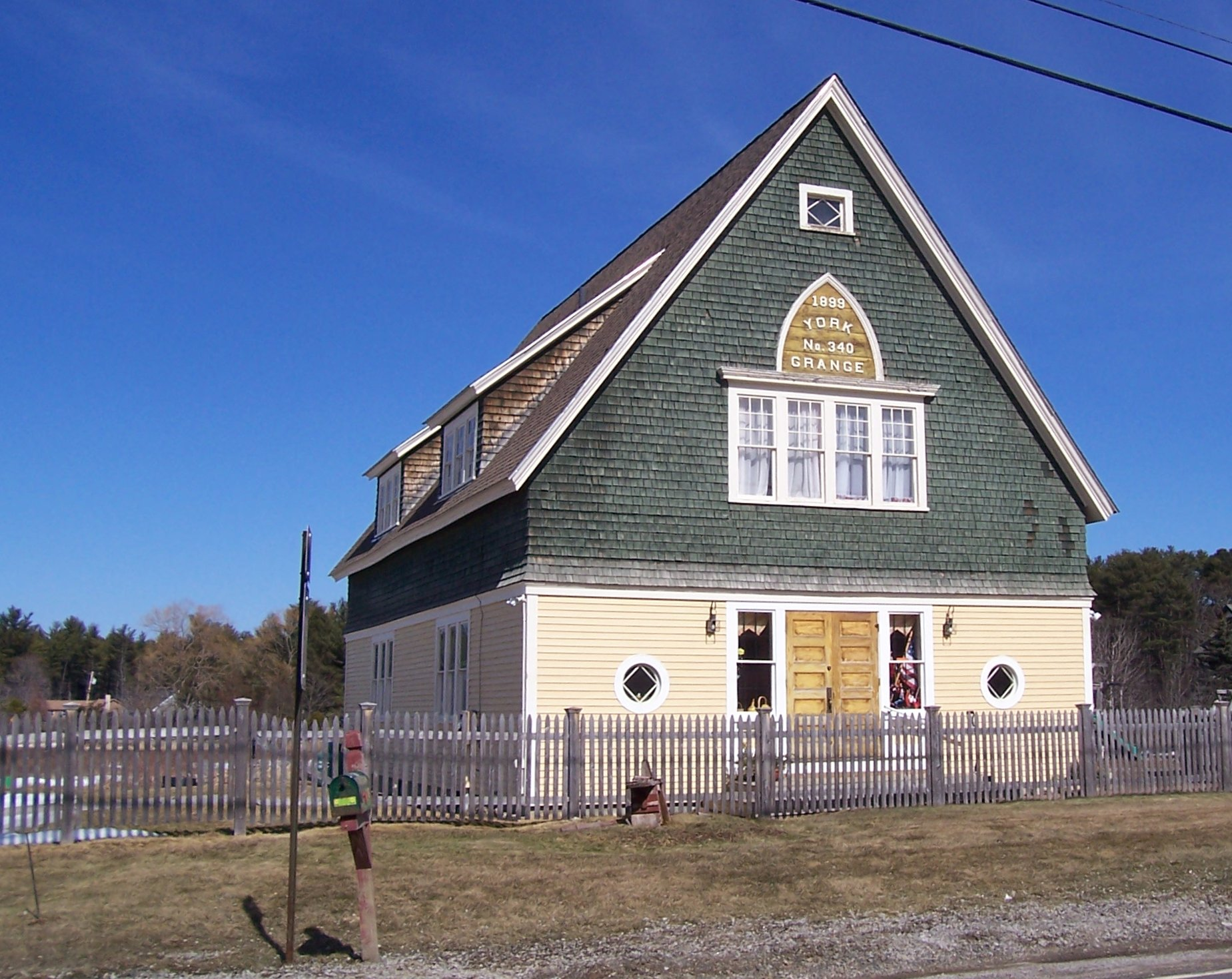
- National Grange building

- Location within the state of Maine Unity (the United States)
- Coordinates: 44°36′40″N 69°20′25″W
- Country: United States
- State: Maine
- County: Waldo

Area
  - Total: 41.36 sq mi (107.12 km^{2})
  - Land: 39.40 sq mi (102.05 km^{2})
  - Water: 1.96 sq mi (5.08 km^{2})
- Elevation: 279 ft (85 m)

Population (2020)
  - Total: 2,292
  - Density: 58/sq mi (22.5/km^{2})
- Time zone: UTC-5 (Eastern (EST))
  - Summer (DST): UTC-4 (EDT)
- ZIP code: 04988
- Area code: 207
- GNIS feature ID: 582773

Unity is a town in Waldo County, Maine, United States. The population was 2,292 at the 2020 census. It contains the census-designated place of the same name. The town is the service center for the northern portion of Waldo County. Outside of Waldo County, it is best known as the home of the Maine Organic Farmers and Gardeners Association, its Common Ground Country Fair and former home of Unity College.

Unity College was founded in 1965 to offset the economic effects of the declining chicken farming industry. As of 2007, the college was the town's largest employer. In 2020, the college announced a significant shift in its educational model, moving to a hybrid learning system that led to a reduction in staff by 15%. As of 2024, the original Unity campus is largely vacant, with only about 50 students using the facilities at any given time.

== History ==
When originally settled by Quakers, the town was known as Twenty-Five Mile Pond Plantation. The name came from its being located on a pond twenty-five miles from Fort Halifax in Winslow. The name was changed to Unity upon incorporation as a town in 1804. In 1898, the Village School was opened. It remained the largest grade school in Unity until 1953 when a new elementary school was built.

In 1996, the Maine Organic Farmers and Gardeners Association (MOFGA) purchased 200 acres of land in Unity, where it is now based. The MOFGA-run Common Ground Country Fair moved with the organization and annually brings more than 50,000 visitors to the town.

During 2008–2009, eight Amish families moved into the community. They belong to the "Michigan Amish Churches", an Amish affiliation that is more open to outsiders than most other Amish affiliations.

== Geography ==
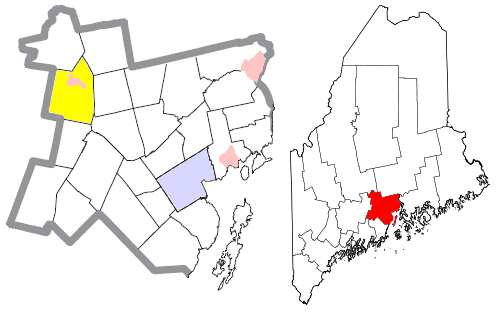
Location of the town of Unity (in yellow) in Waldo County and the state of Maine

According to the United States Census Bureau, the town has a total area of 41.36 square miles (107.12 km^{2}), of which 39.40 square miles (102.05 km^{2}) is land and 1.96 square miles (5.08 km^{2}) is water, chiefly Unity Pond. Principal rivers are Twentyfive Mile Stream (Unity Pond's sole outflow), Sandy Stream and Halfmoon Stream.

The town is crossed by state routes 9, 220, 139 and US route 202. Unity is bordered by Burnham to the north, Troy and Thorndike to the east, Knox to the southeast, Freedom to the south, Albion to the southwest and Unity Township to the west.

== Demographics ==
Historical population
Census	Pop.	Note	%±
1810	793		—
1820	978		23.3%
1830	1,299		32.8%
1840	1,457		12.2%
1850	1,557		6.9%
1860	1,320		−15.2%
1870	1,201		−9.0%
1880	1,095		−8.8%
1890	922		−15.8%
1900	877		−4.9%
1910	899		2.5%
1920	916		1.9%
1930	892		−2.6%
1940	935		4.8%
1950	1,014		8.4%
1960	983		−3.1%
1970	1,280		30.2%
1980	1,431		11.8%
1990	1,817		27.0%
2000	1,889		4.0%
2010	2,099		11.1%
2020	2,292		9.2%
U.S. Decennial Census

=== 2010 census ===
As of the census of 2010, there were 2,099 people, 750 households, and 429 families living in the town. The population density was 53.3 inhabitants per square mile (20.6/km^{2}). There were 939 housing units at an average density of 23.8 per square mile (9.2/km^{2}). The racial makeup of the town was 96.9% White, 0.4% African American, 0.3% Native American, 0.2% Asian, 0.2% from other races, and 1.9% from two or more races. Hispanic or Latino of any race were 1.3% of the population.

There were 750 households, of which 26.3% had children under the age of 18 living with them, 40.7% were married couples living together, 12.4% had a female householder with no husband present, 4.1% had a male householder with no wife present, and 42.8% were non-families. 29.3% of all households were made up of individuals, and 11.4% had someone living alone who was 65 years of age or older. The average household size was 2.34 and the average family size was 2.88.

The median age in the town was 31.2 years. 17.8% of residents were under the age of 18; 26.4% were between the ages of 18 and 24; 19.1% were from 25 to 44; 24% were from 45 to 64; and 12.9% were 65 years of age or older. The gender makeup of the town was 48.8% male and 51.2% female.

=== 2000 census ===
As of the census of 2000, there were 1,889 people, 713 households, and 419 families living in the town. The population density was 47.8 inhabitants per square mile (18.5/km^{2}). There were 926 housing units at an average density of 23.4 per square mile (9.0/km^{2}). The racial makeup of the town was 97.72% White, 0.32% Black or African American, 0.42% Native American, 0.26% Asian, 0.11% from other races, and 1.16% from two or more races. Hispanic or Latino of any race were 0.74% of the population.

There were 713 households, out of which 27.5% had children under the age of 18 living with them, 44.6% were married couples living together, 10.7% had a female householder with no husband present, and 41.2% were non-families. 32.8% of all households were made up of individuals, and 12.9% had someone living alone who was 65 years of age or older. The average household size was 2.27 and the average family size was 2.89.

In the town, the population was spread out, with 20.1% under the age of 18, 22.8% from 18 to 24, 22.6% from 25 to 44, 21.4% from 45 to 64, and 13.2% who were 65 years of age or older. The median age was 32 years. For every 100 females there were 100.7 males. For every 100 females age 18 and over, there were 103.2 males.

The median income for a household in the town was $26,927, and the median income for a family was $36,696. Males had a median income of $29,398 versus $22,708 for females. The per capita income for the town was $15,086. About 18.6% of families and 21.8% of the population were below the poverty line, including 26.3% of those under age 18 and 16.1% of those age 65 or over.

== Notable people ==
- Samuel Stillman Berry, marine zoologist, born in Unity (1887)
- Walter M. Brackett, painter, born in Unity
- George Colby Chase, English scholar; second president of Bates College
