= Maine School Administrative District =

Maine School Administrative District (MSAD or SAD) is a school district in the U.S. state of Maine. There are a total of 52 MSADs.

== List of MSADs ==
A full list of MSADs and the cities and towns they serve can be found at the Maine Department of Education website.

- MSAD 1 (coextensive with RSU 79) – Castle Hill, Chapman, Mapleton, Presque Isle, Westfield
- MSAD 3 (coextensive with RSU 3) – Brooks, Freedom, Jackson, Knox, Liberty, Monroe, Montville, Thorndike, Troy, Unity, Waldo
- MSAD 4 (coextensive with RSU 80) – Abbot, Cambridge, Guilford, Parkman, Sangerville, Wellington
- MSAD 6 (coextensive with RSU 6) – Buxton, Frye Island, Hollis, Limington, Standish
- MSAD 7 (coextensive with RSU 7) – North Haven
- MSAD 8 (coextensive with RSU 8) – Vinalhaven
- MSAD 10 – Allagash
- MSAD 11 (coextensive with RSU 11) – Gardiner, Pittston, Randolph, West Gardiner
- MSAD 12 (coextensive with RSU 82) – Jackman, Moose River
- MSAD 13 (coextensive with RSU 83) – Bingham, Moscow
- MSAD 14 (coextensive with RSU 84) – Danforth, Weston
- MSAD 15 (coextensive with RSU 15) – Gray, New Gloucester
- MSAD 17 (coextensive with RSU 17) – Harrison, Hebron, Norway, Otisfield, Oxford, Paris, Waterford, West Paris
- MSAD 19 (coextensive with RSU 85) – Lubec
- MSAD 20 (coextensive with RSU 86) – Fort Fairfield
- MSAD 23 (coextensive with RSU 87) – Carmel, Levant
- MSAD 24 (coextensive with RSU 88) – Cyr Plantation, Hamlin, Van Buren
- MSAD 27 – Fort Kent, New Canada, Saint Francis, Saint John Plantation, Wallagrass
- MSAD 28 (coextensive with RSU 28) – Camden, Rockport
- MSAD 29 (coextensive with RSU 29) – Hammond, Houlton, Littleton, Monticello
- MSAD 30 (coextensive with RSU 30) – Lee, Springfield, Webster Plantation, Winn
- MSAD 31 (coextensive with RSU 31) – Edinburg, Enfield, Howland, Maxfield, Passadumkeag
- MSAD 32 (coextensive with RSU 32) – Ashland, Garfield Plantation, Masardis
- MSAD 33 (coextensive with RSU 33) – Frenchville, Saint Agatha
- MSAD 35 (coextensive with RSU 35) – Eliot, South Berwick
- MSAD 37 (coextensive with RSU 37) – Addison, Columbia, Columbia Falls, Harrington, Milbridge
- MSAD 40 (coextensive with RSU 40) – Friendship, Union, Waldoboro, Warren, Washington
- MSAD 41 (coextensive with RSU 41) – Brownville, Lagrange, Milo
- MASD 42 (coextensive with RSU 42) – Blaine, Mars Hill
- MSAD 44 (coextensive with RSU 44) – Bethel, Greenwood, Newry, Woodstock
- MSAD 45 (coextensive with RSU 45) – Perham, Wade, Washburn
- MSAD 46 – Dexter, Exeter, Garland, Ripley
- MSAD 49 (coextensive with RSU 49) – Albion, Benton, Clinton, Fairfield
- MSAD 51 (coextensive with RSU 51) – Cumberland, North Yarmouth
- MSAD 52 (coextensive with RSU 52) – Greene, Leeds, Turner
- MSAD 53 (coextensive with RSU 53) – Burnham, Detroit, Pittsfield
- MSAD 54 (coextensive with RSU 54) – Canaan, Cornville, Mercer, Norridgewock, Skowhegan, Smithfield
- MSAD 55 (coextensive with RSU 55) – Baldwin, Cornish, Hiram, Parsonsfield, Porter
- MSAD 57 (coextensive with RSU 57) – Alfred, Limerick, Lyman, Newfield, Shapleigh, Waterboro
- MSAD 58 (coextensvie with RSU 58) – Avon, Kingfield, Phillips, Strong
- MSAD 59 (coextensive with RSU 59) – Madison
- MSAD 60 (coextensive with RSU 60) – Berwick, Lebanon, North Berwick
- MSAD 61 (coextensive with RSU 61) – Bridgton, Casco, Naples
- MSAD 63 (coextensive with RSU 63) – Clifton, Eddington, Holden
- MSAD 64 (coextensive with RSU 64) – Bradford, Corinth, Hudson, Kenduskeag, Stetson
- MSAD 65 (coextensive with RSU 65) – Matinicus Isle Plantation
- MSAD 68 (coextensive with RSU 68) – Charleston, Dover-Foxcroft, Monson, Sebec
- MSAD 70 (coextensive with RSU 70) – Amity, Haynesville, Hodgdon, Linneus, Ludlow, New Limerick
- MSAD 72 (coextensive with RSU 72) – Brownfield, Denmark, Fryeburg, Lovell, Stoneham, Stow, Sweden
- MSAD 74 (coextensive with RSU 74) – Anson, Embden, New Portland, Solon
- MSAD 75 (coextensive with RSU 75) – Bowdoin, Bowdoinham, Harpswell, Topsham
- MSAD 76 – Swans Island

== See also ==
- List of school districts in Maine
