= Regional school unit =

Type of school district in Maine, United States

A regional school unit is a type of school district in Maine.

They were created starting in 2008 pursuant to a change in Maine Law that attempted to save on administrative costs by consolidating Maine's many school districts into larger districts. This change was championed by Governor John Baldacci.

Despite a deadline of January 30, 2009, many voters rejected their local school consolidation plans, citing issues such as loss of local control and higher costs due to bringing lower-paid teachers up to parity. For example, Brewer faced an annual loss of $244,000 in state subsidies for rejecting the consolidation plan, but potentially a loss of $2.74 million in increased salaries over the first 3 years if it had been approved.

As of 2021, 77 RSUs had been formed.

== List of RSUs ==
- RSU 1 - LKRSU – Arrowsic, Bath, Phippsburg, Woolwich
- RSU 2 – Dresden, Farmingdale, Hallowell, Monmouth, Richmond
- RSU 3 (coextensive with MSAD 3) – Brooks, Freedom, Jackson, Knox, Liberty, Monroe, Montville, Thorndike, Troy, Unity, Waldo
- RSU 4 – Litchfield, Sabattus, Wales
- RSU 5 – Durham, Freeport, Pownal
- RSU 6 (coextensive with MSAD 6) – Buxton, Frye Island, Hollis, Limington, Standish
- RSU 7 (coextensive with MSAD 7) – North Haven
- RSU 8 (coextensive with MSAD 8) – Vinalhaven
- RSU 9 – Chesterville, Farmington, Industry, New Sharon, New Vineyard, Starks, Temple, Vienna, Weld, Wilton
- RSU 10 – Buckfield, Hanover, Hartford, Mexico, Roxbury, Rumford, Sumner
- RSU 11 (coextensive with MSAD 11) – Gardiner, Pittston, Randolph, West Gardiner
- RSU 12 – Alna, Chelsea, Palermo, Somerville, Westport, Whitefield, Windsor
- RSU 13 – Cushing, Owls Head, Rockland, South Thomaston, Thomaston
- RSU 14 – Raymond, Windham
- RSU 15 (coextensive with MSAD 15) – Gray, New Gloucester
- RSU 16 – Mechanic Falls, Minot, Poland
- RSU 17 (coextensive with MSAD 17) – Harrison, Hebron, Norway, Otisfield, Oxford, Paris, Waterford, West Paris
- RSU 18 – Belgrade, China, Oakland, Rome, Sidney
- RSU 19 – Corinna, Dixmont, Etna, Hartland, Newport, Palmyra, Plymouth, Saint Albans
- RSU 20 – Searsport, Stockton Springs
- RSU 21 – Arundel, Kennebunk, Kennebunkport
- RSU 22 – Frankfort, Hampden, Newburgh, Winterport
- RSU 23 – Old Orchard Beach
- RSU 24 – Eastbrook, Franklin, Gouldsboro, Mariaville, Sorrento, Steuben, Sullivan, Waltham, Winter Harbor
- RSU 25 – Bucksport, Orland, Prospect, Verona
- RSU 26 – Orono
- RSU 28 (coextensive with MSAD 28) – Camden, Rockport
- RSU 29 (coextensive with MSAD 29) – Hammond, Houlton, Littleton, Monticello
- RSU 30 (coextensive with MSAD 30) – Lee, Springfield, Webster Plantation, Winn
- RSU 31 (coextensive with MSAD 31) – Edinburg, Enfield, Howland, Maxfield, Passadumkeag
- RSU 32 (coextensive with MSAD 32) – Ashland, Garfield Plantation, Masardis
- RSU 33 (coextensive with MSAD 33) – Frenchville, Saint Agatha
- RSU 34 – Alton, Bradley, Old Town
- RSU 35 (coextensive with MSAD 35) – Eliot, South Berwick
- RSU 37 (coextensive with MSAD 37) – Addison, Columbia, Columbia Falls, Harrington, Milbridge
- RSU 38 – Manchester, Mount Vernon, Readfield, Wayne
- RSU 39 – Caribou, Stockholm
- RSU 40 (coextensive with MSAD 40) – Friendship, Union, Waldoboro, Warren, Washington
- RSU 41 (coextensive with MSAD 41) – Brownville, Lagrange, Milo
- RSU 42 (coextensive with MSAD 42) – Blaine, Mars Hill
- RSU 44 (coextensive with MSAD 44) – Bethel, Greenwood, Newry, Woodstock
- RSU 45 (coextensive with MSAD 45) – Perham, Wade, Washburn
- RSU 49 (coextensive with MSAD 49) – Albion, Benton, Clinton, Fairfield
- RSU 50 – Crystal, Dyer Brook, Hersey, Island Falls, Merrill, Oakfield, Smyrna
- RSU 51 (coextensive with MSAD 51) – Cumberland, North Yarmouth
- RSU 52 (coextensive with MSAD 52) – Greene, Leeds, Turner
- RSU 53 (coextensive with MSAD 53) – Burnham, Detroit, Pittsfield
- RSU 54 (coextensive with MSAD 54) – Canaan, Cornville, Mercer, Norridgewock, Skowhegan, Smithfield
- RSU 55 (coextensive with MSAD 55) – Baldwin, Cornish, Hiram, Parsonsfield, Porter
- RSU 56 – Canton, Carthage, Dixfield, Peru
- RSU 57 (coextensive with MSAD 57) – Alfred, Limerick, Lyman, Newfield, Shapleigh, Waterboro
- RSU 58 (coextensive with MSAD 58) – Avon, Kingfield, Phillips, Strong
- RSU 59 (coextensive with MSAD 59) – Madison
- RSU 60 (coextensive with MSAD 60) – Berwick, Lebanon, North Berwick
- RSU 61 (coextensive with MSAD 61) – Bridgton, Casco, Naples
- RSU 63 (coextensive with MSAD 63) – Clifton, Eddington, Holden
- RSU 64 (coextensive with MSAD 64) – Bradford, Corinth, Hudson, Kenduskeag, Stetson
- RSU 65 (coextensive with MSAD 65) – Matinicus Isle Plantation
- RSU 67 – Chester, Lincoln, Mattawamkeag
- RSU 68 (coextensive with MSAD 68) – Charleston, Dover-Foxcroft, Monson, Sebec
- RSU 70 (coextensive with MSAD 70) – Amity, Haynesville, Hodgdon, Linneus, Ludlow, New Limerick
- RSU 71 – Belfast, Belmont, Morrill, Searsmont, Swanville
- RSU 72 (coextensive with MSAD 72) – Brownfield, Denmark, Fryeburg, Lovell, Stoneham, Stow, Sweden
- RSU 73 – Jay, Livermore, Livermore Falls
- RSU 74 (coextensive with MSAD 74) – Anson, Embden, New Portland, Solon
- RSU 75 (coextensive with MSAD 75) – Bowdoin, Bowdoinham, Harpswell, Topsham
- RSU 78 – Dallas Plantation, Magalloway, Rengeley, Rangeley Plantation, Sandy River Plantation
- RSU 79 (coextensive with MSAD 1) – Castle Hill, Chapman, Mapleton, Presque Isle, Westfield
- RSU 80 (coextensive with MSAD 4) – Abbot, Cambridge, Guilford, Parkman, Sangerville, Wellington
- RSU 82 (coextensive with MSAD 12) – Jackman, Moose River
- RSU 83 (coextensive with MSAD 13) – Bingham, Moscow
- RSU 84 (coextensive with MSAD 14) – Danforth, Weston
- RSU 85 (coextensive with MSAD 19) – Lubec
- RSU 86 (coextensive with MSAD 20) – Fort Fairfield
- RSU 87 (coextensive with MSAD 23) – Carmel, Levant
- RSU 88 (coextensive with MSAD 24) – Cyr Plantation, Hamlin, Van Buren
- RSU 89 – Mount Chase, Patten, Sherman, Stacyville
