= Somerset County, Maine =

County in Maine, United States

- County
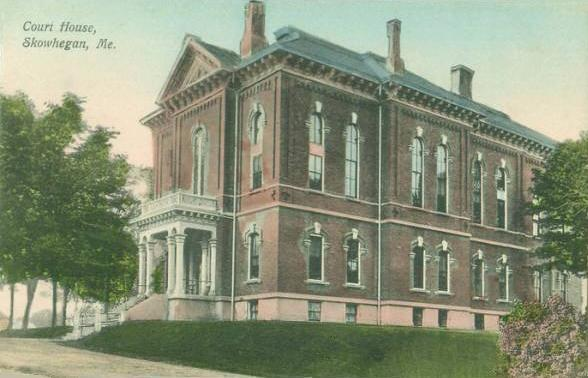
- Somerset County Courthouse

- Seal

- Location within the U.S. state of Maine
- Coordinates: 45°07′58″N 69°51′14″W
- Country: United States
- State: Maine
- Founded: 1809
- Named for: Somerset County, England
- Seat: Skowhegan
- Largest town: Skowhegan

Area
  - Total: 4,094 sq mi (10,600 km^{2})
  - Land: 3,924 sq mi (10,160 km^{2})
  - Water: 169 sq mi (440 km^{2}) 4.1%

Population (2020)
  - Total: 50,477
  - Estimate (2025): 51,620 ▲
  - Density: 12.86/sq mi (4.967/km^{2})
- Time zone: UTC−5 (Eastern)
  - Summer (DST): UTC−4 (EDT)
- Congressional district: 2nd
- Website: somersetcountyme.gov

Somerset County is a county in the U.S. state of Maine, United States. As of the 2020 census, its population was 50,477. Its county seat is Skowhegan.

== History ==
Somerset County was established on March 1, 1809 from portions of Kennebec County and was named after Somerset County in England.

== Geography ==
According to the U.S. Census Bureau, the county has a total area of 4,094 square miles (10,600 km^{2}), of which 169 square miles (440 km^{2}) (4.1%) are covered by water. It is the third-largest county in Maine by area.

=== Mountains ===
- Boundary Bald Mountain
- Coburn Mountain
- Mount Bigelow
- Moxie Mountain
- Sandy Bay Mountain

=== Bodies of water ===
- Carrabassett River
- Flagstaff Lake
- Kennebec River
- Moose River
- Moxie Falls

=== Major highways ===
- Interstate 95
- Maine State Route 6
- Maine State Route 8
- Maine State Route 11
- Maine State Route 15
- Maine State Route 16
- Maine State Route 27
- Maine State Route 100
- Maine State Route 104
- Maine State Route 137
- Maine State Route 139
- U.S. Route 2
- U.S. Route 201
  - Armstrong–Jackman Border Crossing
- U.S. Route 201A

=== Adjacent counties and municipalities ===
- Aroostook County – north
- Penobscot County – east
- Piscataquis County – east
- Waldo County – southeast
- Kennebec County – south
- Franklin County – southwest
- Le Granit Regional County Municipality, Quebec – west
- Beauce-Sartigan Regional County Municipality, Quebec – west
- Les Etchemins Regional County Municipality, Quebec – northwest
- Montmagny Regional County Municipality, Quebec – northwest

Somerset County is one of few counties in the United States to border six counties and/or county equivalents.

== Demographics ==
Historical population
Census	Pop.	Note	%±
1810	12,910		—
1820	21,787		68.8%
1830	35,787		64.3%
1840	33,912		−5.2%
1850	35,581		4.9%
1860	36,753		3.3%
1870	34,611		−5.8%
1880	32,333		−6.6%
1890	32,627		0.9%
1900	33,849		3.7%
1910	36,301		7.2%
1920	37,171		2.4%
1930	39,111		5.2%
1940	38,245		−2.2%
1950	39,785		4.0%
1960	39,749		−0.1%
1970	40,597		2.1%
1980	45,028		10.9%
1990	49,767		10.5%
2000	50,888		2.3%
2010	52,228		2.6%
2020	50,477		−3.4%
2025 (est.)	51,620	▲	2.3%
U.S. Decennial Census; 1790–1960 1900–1990; 1990–2000 2010–2016

=== 2020 census ===
As of the 2020 census, the county had a population of 50,477. Of the residents, 19.0% were under the age of 18 and 22.1% were 65 years of age or older; the median age was 46.9 years. For every 100 females there were 98.8 males, and for every 100 females age 18 and over there were 97.6 males. 15.1% of residents lived in urban areas and 84.9% lived in rural areas.

The racial makeup of the county was 93.5% White, 0.5% Black or African American, 0.5% American Indian and Alaska Native, 0.5% Asian, 0.0% Native Hawaiian and Pacific Islander, 0.5% from some other race, and 4.5% from two or more races. Hispanic or Latino residents of any race comprised 1.3% of the population.

There were 21,924 households in the county, of which 24.3% had children under the age of 18 living with them and 24.0% had a female householder with no spouse or partner present. About 30.0% of all households were made up of individuals and 14.0% had someone living alone who was 65 years of age or older.

There were 29,785 housing units, of which 26.4% were vacant. Among occupied housing units, 75.8% were owner-occupied and 24.2% were renter-occupied. The homeowner vacancy rate was 1.5% and the rental vacancy rate was 6.7%.

Somerset County, Maine – racial and ethnic composition Note: the US Census treats Hispanic/Latino as an ethnic category. This table excludes Latinos from the racial categories and assigns them to a separate category. Hispanics/Latinos may be of any race.
Race / ethnicity (NH = Non-Hispanic)	Pop 2000	Pop 2010	Pop 2020	% 2000	% 2010	% 2020
White alone (NH)	49,699	50,437	46,914	97.66%	96.57%	92.94%
Black or African American alone (NH)	117	185	248	0.22%	0.35%	0.49%
Native American or Alaska Native alone (NH)	203	232	213	0.39%	0.44%	0.42%
Asian alone (NH)	168	294	261	0.33%	0.56%	0.51%
Pacific Islander alone (NH)	11	11	14	0.02%	0.02%	0.02%
Other race alone (NH)	19	29	140	0.03%	0.05%	0.27%
Mixed-race or multiracial (NH)	437	631	2,031	0.85%	1.20%	4.02%
Hispanic or Latino (any race)	234	409	656	0.45%	0.78%	1.29%
Total	50,888	52,228	50,477	100.00%	100.00%	100.00%

=== 2010 census ===
As of 2010, 52,228 people, 21,927 households, and 14,353 families lived in the county. The population density was 13.3 inhabitants per square mile (5.1 inhabitants/km^{2}). The 30,569 housing units had an average density of 7.8 units per square mile (3.0 units/km^{2}). The racial makeup of the county was 97.1% White, 0.6% Asian, 0.5% American Indian, 0.4% Black or African American, 0.1% from other races, and 1.3% were from two or more races. Those of Hispanic or Latino origin made up 0.8% of the population. In terms of ancestry, 25.1% were French, 24.2% were English, 15.8% were Irish, 8.0% were German, 7.9% were American, and 6.1% were French Canadian.

Of the 21,927 households, 28.2% had children under 18 living with them, 49.7% were married couples living together, 10.3% had a female householder with no husband present, 34.5% were not families, and 26.9% of all households were made up of individuals. The average household size was 2.35 and the average family size was 2.80. The median age was 43.6 years.

The median income for a household in the county was $36,647 and for a family was $47,177. Males had a median income of $41,235 versus $30,029 for females. The per capita income for the county was $20,709. About 14.0% of families and 18.4% of the population were below the poverty line, including 25.0% of those under age 18 and 12.7% of those age 65 or over.

=== 2000 census ===
As of the census of 2000, 50,888 people, 20,496 households, and 14,121 families were living in the county. The population density was 13 people per square mile (5.0 people/km^{2}). The 28,222 housing units had an average density of 7 per square mile (2.7/km^{2}). The racial makeup of the county was 98.00% White, 0.24% Black or African American, 0.41% Native American, 0.34% Asian, 0.02% Pacific Islander, 0.11% from other races, and 0.89% from two or more races. About 0.46% of the population were Hispanic or Latino of any race; 20.9% were of English, 17.7% French, 15.1% United States or American, 11.5% Irish, and 8.8% French Canadian ancestry. About 96.2% spoke English and 2.9% French as their first language.

Of the 20,496 households, 31.6% had children under 18 living with them, 54.2% were married couples living together, 10.1% had a female householder with no husband present, and 31.1% were not families. About 24.6% of all households were made up of individuals, and 10.2% had someone living alone who was 65 or older. The average household size was 2.44 and the average family size was 2.87.

In the county, the age distribution was 24.7% under 18, 7.0% from 18 to 24, 28.70% from 25 to 44, 25.30% from 45 to 64, and 14.30% who were 65 or older. The median age was 39 years. For every 100 females, there were 96.00 males. For every 100 females 18 and over, there were 93.30 males.

The median income for a household in the county was $30,731, and for a family was $36,464. Males had a median income of $29,032 versus $20,745 for females. The per capita income for the county was $15,474. About 11.1% of families and 14.9% of the population were below the poverty line, including 19.4% of those under 18 and 12.50% of those 65 or over.

== Government and politics ==
Somerset County is part of Maine's 2nd congressional district and represented by Democrat Jared Golden since 2019.

A "swing" or "pivot" county in the 21st century, despite voting for Democrat Barack Obama in the 2008 and 2012 presidential elections, Somerset County voted for Republican Donald Trump in 2016 and 2020, by a margin of victory of 23.37%. In 2020, Trump became the first presidential candidate to carry the county with more than 60% of the vote since Ronald Reagan in 1984. In 2024, the county shifted to the right again, with Trump's win (a margin of over 27 points) being the best performance by a Republican since Nixon's 1972 landslide. In 1992, the county was one of three in Maine to vote for independent Ross Perot, along with neighboring Piscataquis and Waldo.

=== Voter registration ===
Voter registration and party enrollment as of March 2024
Republican	12,893	40.27%
Unenrolled	9,415	29.41%
Democratic	7,936	24.79%
Green Independent	1,319	4.12%
No Labels	338	1.06%
Libertarian	114	0.36%
Total	32,015	100%

United States presidential election results for Somerset County, Maine
Year	Republican		Democratic		Third party(ies)	
Year	No.	%	No.	%	No.	%
1908	3,688	65.30%	1,676	29.67%	284	5.03%
1912	1,235	19.43%	2,317	36.45%	2,804	44.12%
1916	3,567	51.24%	3,134	45.02%	260	3.74%
1920	6,533	68.11%	2,770	28.88%	289	3.01%
1924	6,855	73.83%	1,822	19.62%	608	6.55%
1928	8,055	70.62%	3,251	28.50%	100	0.88%
1932	7,144	53.07%	6,040	44.87%	277	2.06%
1936	7,558	56.91%	5,282	39.77%	441	3.32%
1940	7,526	53.42%	6,534	46.38%	28	0.20%
1944	7,167	57.23%	5,331	42.57%	25	0.20%
1948	6,301	60.48%	4,034	38.72%	83	0.80%
1952	9,805	66.93%	4,815	32.87%	29	0.20%
1956	10,471	71.77%	4,119	28.23%	0	0.00%
1960	10,142	59.32%	6,956	40.68%	0	0.00%
1964	4,541	29.77%	10,694	70.11%	18	0.12%
1968	6,720	43.76%	8,312	54.13%	324	2.11%
1972	10,079	62.97%	5,921	36.99%	5	0.03%
1976	8,868	46.76%	9,465	49.91%	633	3.34%
1980	9,286	47.59%	8,115	41.59%	2,112	10.82%
1984	13,010	62.64%	7,657	36.86%	104	0.50%
1988	11,430	56.58%	8,603	42.59%	168	0.83%
1992	6,780	25.66%	9,274	35.10%	10,370	39.24%
1996	6,247	27.03%	11,773	50.94%	5,091	22.03%
2000	10,684	44.61%	11,538	48.17%	1,729	7.22%
2004	12,953	47.78%	13,555	50.00%	600	2.21%
2008	11,867	46.07%	13,335	51.77%	556	2.16%
2012	11,800	47.61%	12,216	49.28%	771	3.11%
2016	15,001	57.55%	9,092	34.88%	1,971	7.56%
2020	16,644	60.35%	10,199	36.98%	735	2.67%
2024	17,826	62.68%	10,134	35.63%	481	1.69%

== Communities ==
=== Towns ===
- Anson
- Athens
- Bingham
- Cambridge
- Canaan
- Caratunk
- Cornville
- Detroit
- Embden
- Fairfield
- Harmony
- Hartland
- Jackman
- Madison
- Mercer
- Moose River
- Moscow
- New Portland
- Norridgewock
- Palmyra
- Pittsfield
- Ripley
- St. Albans
- Skowhegan
- Smithfield
- Solon
- Starks

=== Census-designated places ===
- Anson
- Bingham
- Fairfield
- Hartland
- Madison
- Norridgewock
- North Anson
- Pittsfield
- Skowhegan

=== Plantations ===
- Brighton Plantation
- Dennistown
- Highland Plantation
- Pleasant Ridge Plantation
- The Forks
- West Forks

=== Unorganized territories ===
- Central Somerset
- Northeast Somerset
- Northwest Somerset
- Rockwood
- Seboomook Lake

=== Villages ===
- Flagstaff
- North Anson
- Rockwood

== Education ==
=== School districts ===
The following school administrative districts are located at least partly in Somerset County:

- MSAD 4
- MSAD 12
- MSAD 13
- MSAD 46
- MSAD 49
- MSAD 53
- MSAD 54
- MSAD 59
- MSAD 74

Other types of districts in the county include:

- Athens School District
- Brighton Plantation School District
- Caratunk School District
- Dennistown Plantation School District
- Harmony School District
- Highland Plantation School District
- Pleasant Ridge Plantation School District
- The Forks Plantation School District
- West Forks Plantation School District
- Regional School Unit 19

There is also the Somerset Unorganized Territory. Unorganized territory is not in any municipality. The Maine Department of Education takes responsibility for coordinating school assignments in the unorganized territory. The Maine Department of Education formerly operated Rockwood Elementary School in Rockwood Township.

=== Secondary schools ===
- Carrabec High School – North Anson
- Faith Baptist Christian School – Skowhegan (serves multiple grades)
- Forest Hills Consolidated School (K-12) – Jackman
- Lawrence High School – Fairfield
- Madison Area Memorial High School – Madison
- Maine Academy of Natural Sciences – Hinckley
- Maine Central Institute – Pittsfield
- Skowhegan Area High School – Skowhegan
- Upper Kennebec Valley Memorial High School – Bingham

=== Higher education ===
- Kennebec Valley Community College

=== Miscellaneous ===
- Skowhegan School of Painting and Sculpture
- L.C. Bates Museum

== See also ==
- Historical U.S. Census Totals for Somerset County, Maine
- List of counties in Maine
- List of Maine county name etymologies
- List of towns in Somerset County
- Category:People from Somerset County, Maine
- National Register of Historic Places listings in Somerset County, Maine
