= Maine School Administrative District 3 =

School district in Maine, United States

Address
- 84 School Street Unity, Maine; United States

District information
- Type: Public
- Grades: PreK–12
- NCES District ID: 2311520

Students and staff
- Students: 1,083
- Teachers: 111.96
- Staff: 166.7
- Student–teacher ratio: 9.67

Other information
- Website: www.rsu3.org

Mount View High School

Location
- 577 Mount View Road; Thorndike, Maine 04986; United States; 44°33′11″N 69°16′15″W

Information
- Type: Public
- Established: 1964, 2009 (new complex)
- School district: MSAD 3
- Superintendent: Charles Brown
- CEEB code: 201008
- Principal: TBD
- Grades: 9-12
- Gender: Coeducational
- Enrollment: 420 (2016-17)
- Average class size: 23
- Hours in school day: 8-3
- Campus size: Medium
- Colors: Green and white
- Fight song: Mount View Pride
- Sports: Football, soccer, field hockey, indoor soccer, softball, baseball, golf, indoor track, outdoor track, basketball, cheerleading, hackeysack (footbag)
- Mascot: Manny the Mustang
- Team name: Mustangs
- Accreditation: NEASC
- Newspaper: Voicing the View
- Website: www.rsu3.org/o/mvhs

Maine School Administrative District 3 (MSAD 3) is a school district in the U.S. state of Maine, covering the towns of Brooks, Freedom, Jackson, Knox, Liberty, Monroe, Montville, Thorndike, Troy, Unity and Waldo.

== Schools ==
=== High schools ===
- Mount View High School

=== Middle schools ===
- Mount View Middle School

=== Elementary schools ===
- Monroe Elementary School
- Mount View Elementary School
- Troy Elementary School
- Unity Elementary School

=== District schools ===
- Adult & Community Education
- Waldo Community Action Partners - Pre-K
- Waldo County Technical Center
