= West Forks, Maine =

- Plantation
- Location within Maine Location within the United States
- Coordinates: 45°23′02″N 70°00′29″W
- Country: United States
- State: Maine
- County: Somerset

Area
  - Total: 49.4 sq mi (128.0 km^{2})
  - Land: 48.9 sq mi (126.6 km^{2})
  - Water: 0.54 sq mi (1.4 km^{2})
- Elevation: 1,194 ft (364 m)

Population (2020)
  - Total: 58
  - Density: 1.2/sq mi (0.46/km^{2})
- Time zone: UTC-5 (Eastern (EST))
  - Summer (DST): UTC-4 (EDT)
- ZIP code: 04985
- Area code: 207
- FIPS code: 23-82840
- GNIS feature ID: 582805
- Website: westforks.org

West Forks is a plantation in Somerset County, Maine, United States. The population was 58 at the 2020 census.

== Geography ==
According to the United States Census Bureau, the plantation has a total area of 49.4 square miles (128 km^{2}), of which 48.9 square miles (127 km^{2}) is land and 0.6 square miles (1.6 km^{2}) (1.11%) is water. West Forks is located northwest of The Forks.

== Demographics ==
Historical population
| Census | Pop. | Note | %± |
|---|---|---|---|
| 1870 | 73 | | — |
| 1880 | 95 | | 30.1% |
| 1890 | 146 | | 53.7% |
| 1900 | 160 | | 9.6% |
| 1910 | 138 | | −13.7% |
| 1920 | 120 | | −13.0% |
| 1930 | 119 | | −0.8% |
| 1940 | 117 | | −1.7% |
| 1950 | 108 | | −7.7% |
| 1960 | 93 | | −13.9% |
| 1970 | 74 | | −20.4% |
| 1980 | 72 | | −2.7% |
| 1990 | 63 | | −12.5% |
| 2000 | 47 | | −25.4% |
| 2010 | 60 | | 27.7% |
| 2020 | 58 | | −3.3% |
U.S. Decennial Census

At the 2000 census there were 47 people, 23 households, and 10 families residing in the plantation. The population density was 1.0 inhabitant per square mile (0.39/km^{2}). There were 96 housing units at an average density of 2.0 per square mile (0.77/km^{2}). The racial makeup of the plantation was 100.00% White. Of the 23 households, 8.7% had children under the age of 18 living with them, 39.1% were married couples living together, and 52.2% were non-families. 39.1% of households were one person, and 4.3% were one person aged 65 or older. The average household size was 2.04 and the average family size was 2.64.

In the plantation the population was spread out, with 6.4% under the age of 18, 12.8% from 18 to 24, 27.7% from 25 to 44, 38.3% from 45 to 64, and 14.9% 65 or older. The median age was 49 years. For every 100 females, there were 176.5 males. For every 100 females age 18 and over, there were 175.0 males.

The median household income was $39,167 and the median family income was $61,250. Males had a median income of $25,750 versus $13,750 for females. The per capita income for the plantation was $20,042. There were no families and 4.2% of the population living below the poverty line, including no under-eighteens and none of those over 64.
