= Spencer Lake =

Lake in Maine, United States

- Location within Maine Location within the United States
- Location: Somerset County, Maine
- Coordinates: 45°24′N 70°17′W
- Primary inflows: Fish Pond
- Primary outflows: Little Spencer Stream
- Basin countries: United States
- Max. length: 5 mi (8.0 km)
- Max. width: 1,400 yd (1.3 km)
- Surface area: 1,671 acres (676 ha)
- Max. depth: 135 ft (41 m)
- Water volume: 52,555 acre⋅ft (64,826,000 m^{3})
- Surface elevation: 1,086 ft (331 m)

Spencer Lake extends southward from Fish Pond in Hobbstown township into Maine township 3, range 5. The north end of the lake receives drainage from Whipple Bog, Whipple Pond, Hall Pond, Toby Pond, and Chub Pond through Fish Pond. The south end of the lake overflows through Little Spencer Stream and thence Spencer Stream 6 miles (9.7 km) to the Dead River 14 miles (23 km) upstream of the confluence with the Kennebec River at The Forks. The lake supports a native population of lake trout and brook trout, and has been stocked with land-locked Atlantic salmon. There is a boat launch area at the north end of the lake accessible from a 2-mile (3.2 km) gravel road 11 miles (18 km) west off U.S. Route 201 at Parlin Pond.
