= Moxie Falls =

Waterfall in the U.S. state of Maine

Moxie Falls is a waterfall in Somerset County, Maine. At a vertical drop of over 90 feet (30 m) into a pool about 17 feet (5 m) deep, Moxie Falls is one of the highest falls in New England. The falls are part of Moxie Stream which flows from Moxie Pond into the Kennebec River approximately 1 kilometer (0.62 mi) downstream the falls. Moxie Stream drains Moxie Pond approximately 5 miles (8.0 km) upstream of the falls.

The hiking trail to Moxie Falls is approximately 1 mile with a boardwalk for viewing the falls at the end. There are several pools for swimming upstream of the falls.

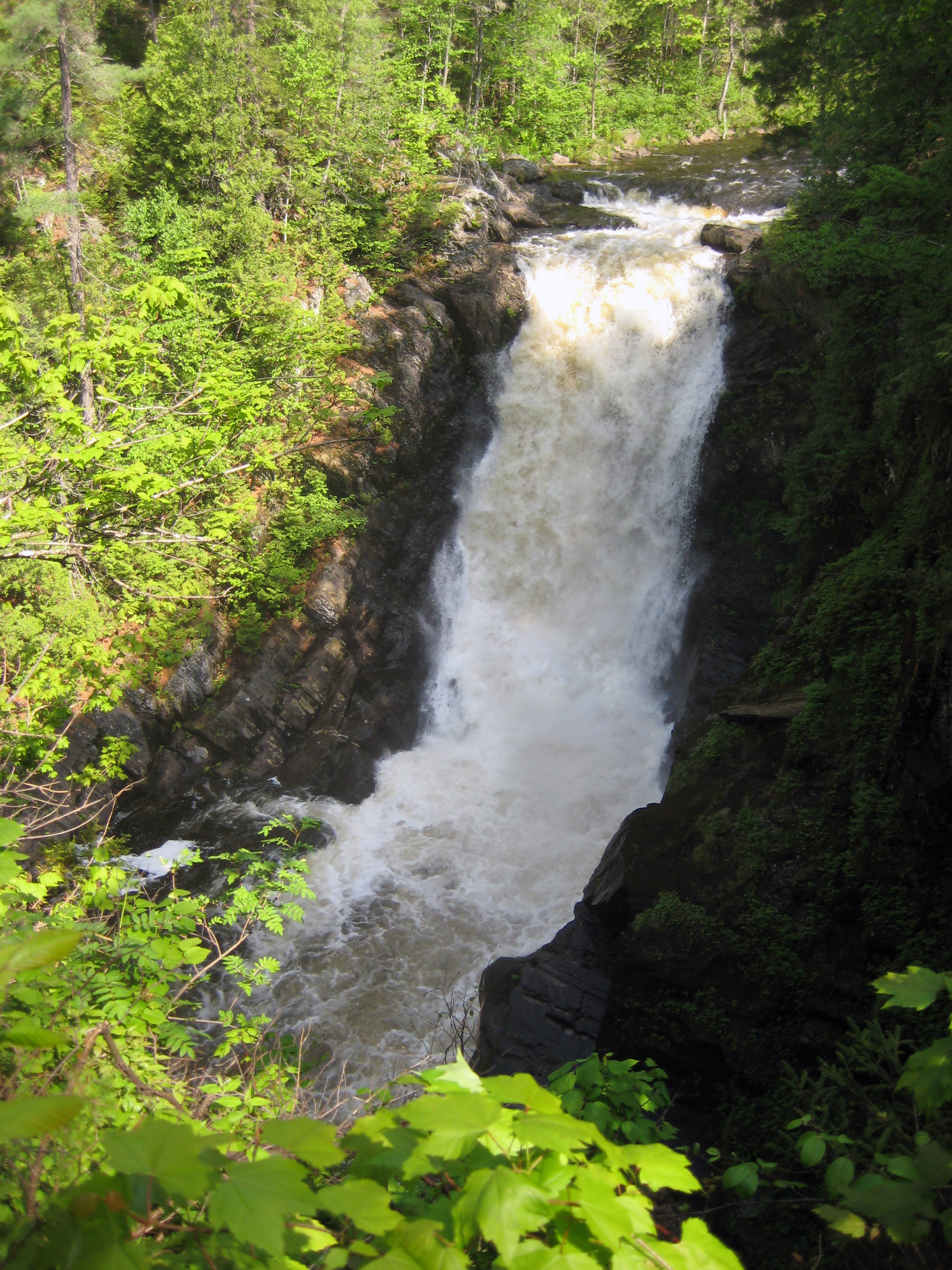

== Moxie Pond ==
Moxie Pond
- Location within Maine
- Location: Somerset County, Maine
- Coordinates: 45°21′50″N 69°56′15″W
- Primary outflows: Moxie Stream
- Basin countries: United States
- Max. length: 7.5 mi (12.1 km)
- Surface area: 2,229 acres (902 ha)
- Water volume: 28,537 acre⋅ft (35,200,000 m^{3})
- Surface elevation: 970 ft (300 m)

Moxie Pond (or Lake Moxie) is approximately 7.5 miles (12.1 km) long and less than one-tenth as wide, with a north–south orientation forming the boundary between The Forks Plantation to the west and East Moxie Township to the east.

Baker Stream discharges into the upstream south end of Moxie Pond, where the stream is crossed by the Appalachian Trail. Baker Pond in the town of Caratunk overflows through Baker Stream approximately 1 mile (1.6 km) upstream of the Appalachian Trail crossing. Baker Pond receives flow from Dimmick Stream. Dimmick Stream originates from Mountain Dimmick Pond on Moxie Mountain, and flows approximately 3 miles (4.8 km) through Big Dimmick Pond and Little Dimmick Pond before reaching Baker Pond. Baker Stream also receives drainage from Moxie Bog and Wild Brook in Bald Mountain Township.

Mosquito Stream flows 4 miles (6.4 km) from Mosquito Mountain through Mosquito Pond into Moxie Pond. Little Sandy Stream with a length of 2.5 miles (4.0 km) also flows into the west side of Moxie Pond. Tributaries flowing into the east side of Moxie Pond are Alder Stream with a length of 5 miles (8.0 km), Big Sandy Stream with a length of 5 miles (8.0 km), Bear Brook with a length of 3 miles (4.8 km), and Bald Mountain Brook with a length of 2 miles (3.2 km).

The Maine Central Railroad Kineo branch was built along the west side of Moxie pond in 1906 serving a sawmill at the north end outlet of the pond and a logging branch to Bald Mountain from the south end of the pond. The railroad was dismantled in 1933.

== See also ==
- List of waterfalls
