= Maine State Route 203 =

State highway in Waldo County, Maine, US

State Route 203

Route information
- Maintained by Town of Waldo and Town of Brooks
- Length: 4.62 mi (7.44 km)
- Existed: c. 1950–2023

Major junctions
- South end: SR 131 in Waldo
- North end: SR 139 in Brooks

Location
- Country: United States
- State: Maine
- Counties: Waldo

Highway system
- Maine State Highway System; Interstate; US; State; Auto trails; Lettered highways
← US 202	→ SR 204

State Route 203 (SR 203) was a state highway in Maine, located in Waldo County. The route was 4.62 miles (7.44 km) long and ran from SR 131 in Waldo, to SR 139 in Brooks. It was the only state-numbered highway in Maine that was entirely locally maintained.

As of 2026, State Route 203 no longer exists. It is now a local town road called the Lang Hill Highway in Brooks and called Pond Road in Waldo.

== Route description ==
SR 203 began at an intersection with SR 131 in Waldo, southwest of the town center at an intersection named Neals Corner. It headed north along Pond Road heading through a wooded area with no houses or other structures only passing under a set of power lines. About 1/3 mile (0.54 km) later, the road entered the town of Brooks and the road name changed to Lang Hill Highway. Though the road was still within a mostly wooded area, some farms and houses begin to line the road. It makes some curves towards the east as it passed around Lake Passagassawakeag, the source of the Passagassawakeag River. At Morgan Pitch Road, SR 203 curved to the northwest and would remain in this general heading for the remainder of the route. After crossing Marsh Stream, the highway ended at a Y-intersection with SR 139 west of the center of Brooks.

SR 203 was the only state route in Maine that was designated by the Maine Department of Transportation as a town road for its entire length as opposed to a state highway or a state-aid highway. All maintenance on the road was performed by the respective town in which the road sat.

== Junction list ==
The entire route was in Waldo County.

Location	mi	km	Destinations	Notes
Waldo	0.00	0.00	SR 131 (Waldo Station Road)	
Brooks	4.62	7.44	SR 139 (Purple Heart Highway) – Thorndike, Brooks	
1.000 mi = 1.609 km; 1.000 km = 0.621 mi
