= Dennistown Plantation, Maine =

Dennistown Plantation Plantation de Dennistown
- Plantation
- Location within Maine Location within the United States
- Coordinates: 45°39′50″N 70°22′32″W
- Country: United States
- State: Maine
- County: Somerset

Area
  - Total: 40.6 sq mi (105.1 km^{2})
  - Land: 38.8 sq mi (100.4 km^{2})
  - Water: 1.8 sq mi (4.7 km^{2})
- Elevation: 1,408 ft (429 m)

Population (2020)
  - Total: 61
  - Density: 1.6/sq mi (0.61/km^{2})
- Time zone: UTC-5 (Eastern (EST))
  - Summer (DST): UTC-4 (EDT)
- ZIP code: 04945
- Area code: 207
- FIPS code: 23-17285
- GNIS feature ID: 582439

Dennistown Plantation (French: Plantation de Dennistown) is a plantation in Somerset County, Maine, United States. The population was 61 at the 2020 census.

== Geography ==
According to the United States Census Bureau, the plantation has a total area of 40.6 square miles (105 km^{2}), of which 38.8 square miles (100 km^{2}) is land and 1.8 square miles (4.7 km^{2}) (4.46%) is water.

== Demographics ==
Historical population
Census	Pop.	Note	%±
1880	73		—
1890	66		−9.6%
1900	96		45.5%
1910	99		3.1%
1920	120		21.2%
1930	29		−75.8%
1940	48		65.5%
1950	24		−50.0%
1960	17		−29.2%
1970	48		182.4%
1980	30		−37.5%
1990	32		6.7%
2000	30		−6.2%
2010	33		10.0%
2020	61		84.8%
U.S. Decennial Census

As of the census of 2000, there were 30 people, 10 households, and 9 families residing in the plantation. The population density was 0.8 inhabitants per square mile (0.31/km^{2}). There were 38 housing units at an average density of 1.0 per square mile (0.39/km^{2}). The racial makeup of the plantation was 100.00% White.

There were 10 households, out of which 30.0% had children under the age of 18 living with them, 80.0% were married couples living together, 10.0% had a female householder with no husband present, and 10.0% were non-families. 10.0% of all households were made up of individuals, and none had someone living alone who was 65 years of age or older. The average household size was 3.00 and the average family size was 3.11.

In the plantation the population was spread out, with 23.3% under the age of 18, 6.7% from 18 to 24, 23.3% from 25 to 44, 40.0% from 45 to 64, and 6.7% who were 65 years of age or older. The median age was 40 years. For every 100 females, there were 130.8 males. For every 100 females age 18 and over, there were 109.1 males.

The median income for a household in the plantation was $85,889, and the median income for a family was $85,889. Males had a median income of $56,250 versus $38,750 for females. The per capita income for the plantation was $28,085. None of the population and none of the families were below the poverty line.
