= Highland Plantation, Maine =

- Plantation
- Logo

- Location within Maine Location within the United States
- Coordinates: 45°06′40″N 70°06′32″W
- Country: United States
- State: Maine
- County: Somerset

Area
  - Total: 42.0 sq mi (108.9 km^{2})
  - Land: 42.0 sq mi (108.8 km^{2})
  - Water: 0.039 sq mi (0.1 km^{2})
- Elevation: 1,539 ft (469 m)

Population (2020)
  - Total: 52
  - Density: 1.2/sq mi (0.48/km^{2})
- Time zone: UTC-5 (Eastern (EST))
  - Summer (DST): UTC-4 (EDT)
- ZIP Code: 04961
- Area code: 207
- FIPS code: 23-32895
- GNIS feature ID: 582519
- Website: www.highlandplt.com

Highland Plantation is a plantation in Somerset County, Maine, United States. The population was 52 at the 2020 census.

== Geography ==
According to the United States Census Bureau, the plantation has a total area of 42.0 square miles (109 km^{2}), of which 42.0 square miles (109 km^{2}) is land and 0.04 square miles (0.10 km^{2}) (0.05%) is water.

Briggs Hill is a mountain summit in the far southeastern corner of Highland Plantation and its base apparently runs across the plantation border into Lexington Township. The hill is located at latitude - longitude coordinates N 45.06 and W 70.02. Briggs Hill climbs to 1,952 feet (595 meters) above sea level. Historical records would suggest Briggs Hill derived its name from an early settler, Adin Briggs. He, wife Susanna Cottle, and children resided on the hill in the early 1840s, finally leaving the stony farm in 1846 to travel westward (locating permanently in Willow Creek Township, Lee County, Illinois).

== Demographics ==
Historical population
Census	Pop.	Note	%±
1870	128		—
1880	121		−5.5%
1890	76		−37.2%
1900	67		−11.8%
1910	68		1.5%
1920	55		−19.1%
1930	61		10.9%
1940	53		−13.1%
1950	56		5.7%
1960	46		−17.9%
1970	23		−50.0%
1980	60		160.9%
1990	38		−36.7%
2000	52		36.8%
2010	73		40.4%
2020	52		−28.8%
U.S. Decennial Census

As of the census of 2000, there were 52 people, 24 households, and 16 families residing in the plantation. The population density was 1.2 inhabitants per square mile (0.46/km^{2}). There were 56 housing units at an average density of 1.3 per square mile (0.50/km^{2}). The racial makeup of the plantation was 100.00% White.

There were 24 households, out of which 16.7% had children under the age of 18 living with them, 62.5% were married couples living together, and 33.3% were non-families. 33.3% of all households were made up of individuals, and 29.2% had someone living alone who was 65 years of age or older. The average household size was 2.17 and the average family size was 2.69.

In the plantation the population was spread out, with 17.3% under the age of 18, 13.5% from 25 to 44, 36.5% from 45 to 64, and 32.7% who were 65 years of age or older. The median age was 53 years. For every 100 females, there were 73.3 males. For every 100 females age 18 and over, there were 72.0 males.

The median income for a household in the plantation was $27,917, and the median income for a family was $27,917. Males had a median income of $14,167 versus $21,250 for females. The per capita income for the plantation was $10,038. There were 23.5% of families and 34.8% of the population living below the poverty line, including 56.5% of under eighteens and 25.0% of those over 64.
