= Pleasant Ridge Plantation, Maine =

- Plantation
- Location within Maine Location within the United States
- Coordinates: 45°06′51″N 69°59′38″W
- Country: United States
- State: Maine
- County: Somerset

Area
  - Total: 24.1 sq mi (62.4 km^{2})
  - Land: 22.0 sq mi (57.1 km^{2})
  - Water: 2.0 sq mi (5.3 km^{2})
- Elevation: 1,056 ft (322 m)

Population (2020)
  - Total: 85
  - Density: 3.9/sq mi (1.5/km^{2})
- Time zone: UTC-5 (Eastern (EST))
  - Summer (DST): UTC-4 (EDT)
- ZIP Code: 04920
- Area code: 207
- FIPS code: 23-59705
- GNIS feature ID: 582678

Pleasant Ridge Plantation is a plantation in Somerset County, Maine, United States. The population was 85 at the 2020 census.

== Geography ==
According to the United States Census Bureau, the plantation has a total area of 24.1 square miles (62 km^{2}), of which 22.0 square miles (57 km^{2}) is land and 2.0 square miles (5.2 km^{2}) (8.51%) is water.

== Demographics ==
Historical population
Census	Pop.	Note	%±
1850	143		—
1860	159		11.2%
1870	135		−15.1%
1880	128		−5.2%
1890	108		−15.6%
1900	114		5.6%
1910	92		−19.3%
1920	90		−2.2%
1930	104		15.6%
1940	92		−11.5%
1950	80		−13.0%
1960	108		35.0%
1970	116		7.4%
1980	99		−14.7%
1990	91		−8.1%
2000	83		−8.8%
2010	93		12.0%
2020	85		−8.6%
U.S. Decennial Census

As of the census of 2000, there were 83 people, 39 households, and 24 families residing in the plantation. The population density was 3.8 people per square mile (1.5 people/km^{2}). There were 89 housing units at an average density of 4.0 per square mile (1.5/km^{2}). The racial makeup of the plantation was 97.59% White, and 2.41% from two or more races.

There were 39 households, out of which 20.5% had children under the age of 18 living with them, 61.5% were married couples living together, 2.6% had a female householder with no husband present, and 35.9% were non-families. 23.1% of all households were made up of individuals, and 10.3% had someone living alone who was 65 years of age or older. The average household size was 2.13 and the average family size was 2.44.

In the plantation the population was spread out, with 14.5% under the age of 18, 3.6% from 18 to 24, 25.3% from 25 to 44, 37.3% from 45 to 64, and 19.3% who were 65 years of age or older. The median age was 52 years. For every 100 females, there were 88.6 males. For every 100 females age 18 and over, there were 97.2 males.

The median income for a household in the plantation was $19,464, and the median income for a family was $25,625. Males had a median income of $53,750 versus $19,375 for females. The per capita income for the plantation was $13,878. There were 13.0% of families and 18.4% of the population living below the poverty line, including 29.4% of under eighteens and 13.3% of those over 64.
