= MSAD =

MSAD may refer to:

- Microsoft Active Directory, a component of Microsoft Windows that provides distributed user management and authentication
- Maine School Administrative District are school districts in Maine. There are a total of 72 MSADs.
