= Ezra Abbot =

American biblical scholar (1819–1884)

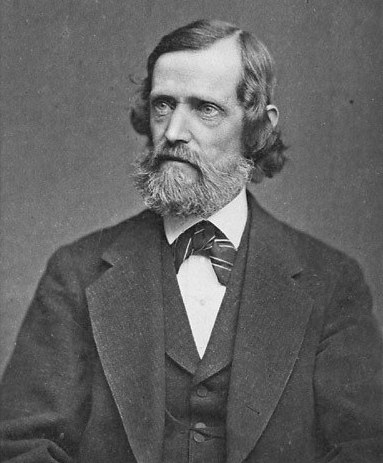
- Born: April 28, 1819; Jackson, Maine
- Died: March 21, 1884 (aged 64); Cambridge, Massachusetts
- Occupations: Bussey Professor of New Testament Criticism and Interpretation in the Harvard Divinity School
- Known for: Biblical scholar
- Awards: Fellow of the American Academy of Arts and Sciences

Academic background
- Education: Bowdoin College

Signature
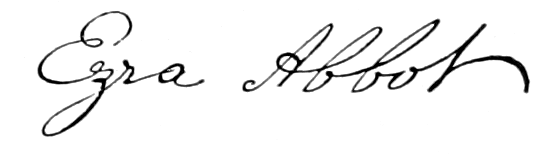

Ezra Abbot (April 28, 1819, Jackson, Maine – March 21, 1884, Cambridge, Massachusetts) was an American biblical scholar.

== Life and writings ==
Abbot was born at Jackson, Maine, April 28, 1819; son of Ezra and Phebe Abbot. He was educated at Phillips Exeter Academy and graduated from Bowdoin College in 1840. In 1847, at the request of Andrews Norton, he went to Cambridge, Massachusetts where he was principal of a public school until 1856. He was assistant librarian of Harvard University from 1856 to 1872, and planned and perfected an alphabetical card catalog, combining many of the advantages of the ordinary dictionary catalogs with the grouping of the minor topics under more general heads, which is characteristic of a systematic catalogue. From 1872 until his death he was Bussey Professor of New Testament Criticism and Interpretation in the Harvard Divinity School.

Abbot's studies were chiefly in Southwest Asian languages and textual criticism of the New Testament, though his work as a bibliographer showed such results as the exhaustive list of writings (5300 in all) on the doctrine of the future life, appended to William Rounseville Alger's History of the Doctrine of a Future Life, as it has prevailed in all Nations and Ages (1862), and published separately in 1864.

Abbot's publications, though always of the most thorough and scholarly character, were to a large extent dispersed in the pages of reviews, dictionaries, concordances, texts edited by others, Unitarian controversial treatises, etc. However, he took a more conspicuous and personal part in the preparation (with Baptist scholar Horatio Balch Hackett) of the enlarged American edition of Dr. (afterwards Sir) William Smith's Dictionary of the Bible (1867–1870), to which he contributed more than 400 articles, as well as greatly improving the bibliographical completeness of the work. He was an efficient member of the American revision committee for the Revised Version (1881–1885) of the King James Bible, and helped prepare Caspar René Gregory's Prolegomena to the revised Greek New Testament of Constantin von Tischendorf.

He was one of the 32 founding members of the Society of Biblical Literature in 1880.

His principal single work, representing his scholarly method and conservative conclusions, was The Authorship of the Fourth Gospel: External Evidences (1880; 2nd ed. by J. H. Thayer, with other essays, 1889), originally a lecture. In spite of the compression due to its form, this work was up to that time probably the ablest defense, based on external evidence, of the Johannine authorship, and certainly the most complete treatment of the relation of Justin Martyr to this gospel.

== Honors ==
Abbot was elected a Fellow of the American Academy of Arts and Sciences in 1861. Though a layman, he received the degree of S.T.D. from Harvard in 1872, and that of D.D. from Edinburgh in 1884.

== Works ==
=== Books ===
- Abbot, Ezra; Hudson, Charles F.; Hastings, H. L. (1871). A Critical Greek and English concordance of the New Testament (2nd. ed.). Philadelphia, PA: Lippincott. OCLC 17645776. - revised by Ezra Abbot
- ——— (1872). Memoir of the Controversy Respecting the Three Heavenly Witnesses: I John V. 7
- ——— (1880). The authorship of the Fourth Gospel: external evidences. Boston, MA: G.H. Ellis. OCLC 1152377.
- ———; Harris, J. Rendel (2009) [1885]. Notes on Scrivener's "Plain introduction to the criticism of the New Testament" (3rd ed.). Boston, MA: Houghton, Mifflin. OCLC 1361022.
- ——— (2007) [1888]. The authorship of the Fourth Gospel, and other critical essays: selected from the published papers of the late Ezra Abbot. Boston, MA: G.H. Ellis. ISBN 9780837020044. OCLC 2937371.

=== Journal articles ===
- ——— (1872). "On the comparative antiquity of the Sinaitic and Vatican manuscripts of the Greek Bible". Journal of the American Oriental Society. 10. American Oriental Society: 189–200. doi:10.2307/592128. JSTOR 592128.
