= Bangor Railway and Electric Company =

The Bangor Railway & Electric Company, founded as the Bangor Street Railway and renamed in 1924 as Bangor Hydro-Electric, operated trolleys on an electric railway between Bangor and Charleston, Maine, from 1889 to 1930.

It began operation the year after the world's first widely successful electric trolley system debuted in Richmond, Virginia.
