= Hartland (CDP), Maine =

Hartland, Maine
- Census-designated place
- Location within Maine Location within the United States
- Coordinates: 44°52′36″N 69°27′22″W
- Country: United States
- State: Maine
- County: Somerset

Area
  - Total: 2.27 sq mi (5.89 km^{2})
  - Land: 2.22 sq mi (5.76 km^{2})
  - Water: 0.050 sq mi (0.13 km^{2})
- Elevation: 262 ft (80 m)

Population (2020)
  - Total: 756
  - Density: 339.9/sq mi (131.22/km^{2})
- Time zone: UTC-5 (Eastern (EST))
  - Summer (DST): UTC-4 (EDT)
- ZIP code: 04943
- Area code: 207
- FIPS code: 23-31705
- GNIS feature ID: 2377917

Hartland is a census-designated place (CDP) in the town of Hartland in Somerset County, Maine, United States. The population was 756 at the 2020 census.

== Geography ==
According to the United States Census Bureau, the CDP has a total area of 2.2 square miles (5.8 km^{2}), of which 2.2 square miles (5.7 km^{2}) is land and 0.1 square mile (0.1 km^{2}) (2.23%) is water.

== Demographics ==
Historical population
Census	Pop.	Note	%±
2020	756		—
U.S. Decennial Census

As of the census of 2000, there were 872 people, 336 households, and 228 families residing in the CDP. The population density was 397.8 inhabitants per square mile (153.6/km^{2}). There were 381 housing units at an average density of 173.8 per square mile (67.1/km^{2}). The racial makeup of the CDP was 97.82% White, 0.34% Black or African American, 1.03% Native American, 0.11% Pacific Islander, and 0.69% from two or more races. Hispanic or Latino of any race were 0.23% of the population.

There were 336 households, out of which 31.3% had children under the age of 18 living with them, 48.5% were married couples living together, 14.6% had a female householder with no husband present, and 32.1% were non-families. 24.7% of all households were made up of individuals, and 9.2% had someone living alone who was 65 years of age or older. The average household size was 2.46 and the average family size was 2.90.

In the CDP, the population was spread out, with 25.0% under the age of 18, 10.1% from 18 to 24, 26.8% from 25 to 44, 21.1% from 45 to 64, and 17.0% who were 65 years of age or older. The median age was 37 years. For every 100 females, there were 88.7 males. For every 100 females age 18 and over, there were 88.5 males.

The median income for a household in the CDP was $28,587, and the median income for a family was $33,229. Males had a median income of $27,159 versus $21,087 for females. The per capita income for the CDP was $13,393. About 10.4% of families and 17.7% of the population were below the poverty line, including 24.9% of those under age 18 and 4.7% of those age 65 or over.
