= Butterfield Landing =

Town in Maine, United States

Coordinates: 45°43′N 67°52′W

Butterfield Landing is a location in Weston, Aroostook County, Maine.
