= Maine School Administrative District 12 =

School district in Maine, United States

Maine School Administrative District 12 (MSAD 12) is a school district in Somerset County, Maine, United States, covering the towns of Jackman and Moose River. It has one K-12 school, Forest Hills Consolidated School.
