= Maine School Administrative District 13 =

School district in Maine, United States

District information
- Motto: Home of the Valley Cavaliers
- Superintendent: Sandra MacArthur

Other information
- Website: www.sad13.org

Maine School Administrative District 13 (MSAD 13) is a school district in Somerset County Maine, United States. It covers the towns of Bingham and Moscow. The district contains two schools, Upper Kennebec Valley Jr./Sr. High School and Moscow Elementary School.
