= Maine School Administrative District 46 =

School district in Penobscot County, Maine, United States

Location
- Penobscot County, Maine; United States
- Coordinates: 45°0′N 69°14′W

District information
- Type: Public
- Grades: K to 12

Students and staff
- Students: 1,025 (2006–07)
- Teachers: 97.7 (on FTE basis)

Other information
- Website: www.aos94.org/newstaffinfo/

Maine School Administrative District 46 (MSAD 46) is a school district that serves the towns of Dexter, Exeter, Ripley and Garland, Maine. It is located in Penobscot County which is also known as the "Maine Highlands". There are a total of six schools in the district: Garland Elementary, Exeter Elementary, Dexter Primary School, Dexter Middle School, Dexter Regional High School, and Tri-County Technical Center. Approximately 1,100 students from the area are enrolled.

== History ==
In May 2014 the district had plans to eliminate the education technical position at Dexter Regional High School. It was a part of a proposed budget, approved by the SAD 46 board 5-0.

== Tri-County Technical Center ==
Tri-County Technical Center serves students from five Maine School Administrative Districts: 46, 48, 41, 4, and 68. It currently offers nine areas of study: Automotive Repair, Commercial Truck Driving, Criminal Justice, Graphic Design and Communications, Culinary Arts, Health Occupations, Building Trades, Metals Manufacturing, and Computer Repair.

The Technical Center offers a variety of certifications and opportunities for credits earned to transfer to secondary education. Sample certifications include:

- Automotive Repair — Wix Filter certification and Timkins bearings certification
- Computer Systems Repair — COMP-TIA A+, Technician A+, and Network +
- Building Trades — 10- and 30-hour OSHA cards (10 in the first year, 30 in the second) and NCCER certification
- Graphic Design and Communications — Adobe Certified Assistant
- Metals Manufacturing — 10-hour OSHA and Maine Oxy certification
- Commercial Truck Driving — Maine Class A Commercial Driving License
- Health Occupations — CPR & First Aid, PCA and Certified Nursing Assistant certificate — credits will transfer to Maine community colleges and to some public and private 4 year schools.
- Culinary Arts — ServSafe
- Criminal Justice — two years in the program allows students to opt out of the Introduction to Law Enforcement class at Husson University.
