= Webster Plantation, Maine =

- Plantation
- Location within Maine Location within the United States
- Coordinates: 45°29′05″N 68°11′42″W
- Country: United States
- State: Maine
- County: Penobscot

Area
  - Total: 36.7 sq mi (95.1 km^{2})
  - Land: 36.6 sq mi (94.9 km^{2})
  - Water: 0.077 sq mi (0.2 km^{2})
- Elevation: 443 ft (135 m)

Population (2020)
  - Total: 68
  - Density: 1.9/sq mi (0.72/km^{2})
- Time zone: UTC-5 (Eastern (EST))
  - Summer (DST): UTC-4 (EDT)
- ZIP code: 04487
- Area code: 207
- FIPS code: 23-81055
- GNIS feature ID: 582797

Webster Plantation is a plantation in Penobscot County, Maine, United States. The population was 68 at the 2020 census.

== Geography ==
According to the United States Census Bureau, the plantation has a total area of 36.7 square miles (95.1 km^{2}), of which 36.6 square miles (94.9 km^{2}) is land and 0.077 square miles (0.2 km^{2}), or 0.19%, is water.

== Demographics ==
Historical population
Census	Pop.	Note	%±
1870	28		—
1880	118		321.4%
1890	135		14.4%
1900	124		−8.1%
1910	103		−16.9%
1920	87		−15.5%
1930	90		3.4%
1940	89		−1.1%
1950	92		3.4%
1960	79		−14.1%
1970	56		−29.1%
1980	82		46.4%
1990	95		15.9%
2000	82		−13.7%
2010	85		3.7%
2020	68		−20.0%
U.S. Decennial Census

At the 2000 census there were 82 people, 27 households, and 23 families in the plantation. The population density was 2.2 people per square mile (0.9/km^{2}). There were 41 housing units at an average density of 1.1 per square mile (0.4/km^{2}). The racial makeup of the plantation was 100.00% White. Of the 27 households 44.4% had children under the age of 18 living with them, 70.4% were married couples living together, 3.7% had a female householder with no husband present, and 14.8% were non-families. 11.1% of households were one person and 3.7% were one person aged 65 or older. The average household size was 3.04 and the average family size was 3.17.

The age distribution was 30.5% under the age of 18, 11.0% from 18 to 24, 30.5% from 25 to 44, 17.1% from 45 to 64, and 11.0% 65 or older. The median age was 34 years. For every 100 females, there were 90.7 males. For every 100 females age 18 and over, there were 96.6 males.

The median household income was $19,583 and the median family income was $23,438. Males had a median income of $21,250 versus $11,667 for females. The per capita income for the plantation was $8,385. There were 16.0% of families and 30.8% of the population living below the poverty line, including 15.4% of under eighteens and 14.3% of those over 65.
