= Maine School Administrative District 54 =

School district in Somerset County, Maine, United States

Address
- 196 West Front Street Skowhegan, Maine, 04976; United States

District information
- Grades: PK-12
- Superintendent: Jon Moody
- Schools: 8 (2017-18)
- Budget: $37.37 million (2015-16)
- NCES District ID: 2314590

Students and staff
- Students: 2,493 (2017-18)
- Teachers: 211.5 (2017-18)
- Staff: 279.3 (2017-18)

Other information
- Website: www.msad54.org

Maine School Administrative District 54 (MSAD 54) is an operating school district within Somerset County, Maine, covering the towns of Skowhegan, Canaan, Mercer, Smithfield, Cornville, and Norridgewock.

== Schools ==
MSAD 54 oversees 5 elementary schools, one middle school, and one high school, as well as a career and technical center and Adult Education center.

=== Elementary schools ===
- Bloomfield Elementary School
- Canaan Elementary School
- Margaret Chase Smith School
- Mill Stream Elementary School
- North Elementary School

=== Middle schools ===
- Skowhegan Area Middle School

=== High schools ===
- Skowhegan Area High School
