= Lawrence High School (Maine) =

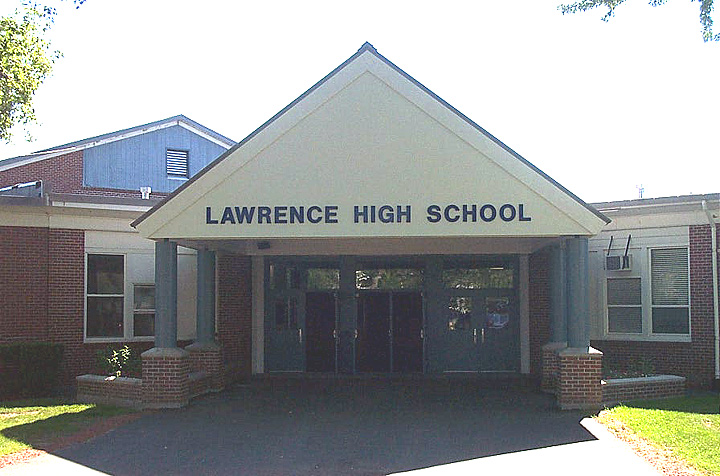
- Main entrance in 2003

Location
- 9 School Street; Fairfield, Maine; United States; 44.589°N 69.605°W

Information
- School district: MSAD #49
- Principal: Dan Bowers
- Teaching staff: 41.50 (FTE)
- Enrollment: 553 (2023-2024)
- Student to teacher ratio: 13.33
- Colors: Blue & gray
- Mascot: Bulldog
- Yearbook: Lawrence Lyre
- Feeder schools: Lawrence Junior High
- Website: www.msad49.org/o/lhs

Lawrence High School is a public secondary school in Fairfield, Maine, United States. It is a part of the Maine School Administrative District (MSAD) 49 and is the district's only public high school. Lawrence serves students from the four towns of Albion, Benton, Clinton, and Fairfield. It offers dual enrollment credits through the local colleges Thomas and KVCC. Students can also earn college credits through a variety of AP classes.

== Sports ==
Lawrence High School offers several sports both in varsity and junior varsity. These sports include American football, soccer, cross country, marching band, indoor track, basketball, outdoor track, softball, field hockey, cheerleading, hockey, golf, bowling, swimming, wrestling, and baseball. Lawrence sports teams are part of the Kennebec Valley Athletic Conference (KVAC). Lawrence competes in class A which comprises the largest high schools in the state, except for football, where they were placed in Class B beginning in 2013. Lawrence also has a tennis club.

Lawrence High School has a long tradition of excellence in athletics. They won their first football state championship in 1973, followed by championship victories in 1983, 1984 and 2006. Lawrence also appeared in the state championship in 1980, 1985, 1986, 1988, 1990, 1992, 1996, 2007, 2011 and 2012.

The boys' outdoor track team won State Championships in 1973, 1974, 1975, 1976, 1977, 1980, 1981, and 1982. The boys' indoor track team won State Championships in 1973, 1974, 1975, 1979, 1980, 1981 and 1982. The boys' soccer team won a state championship in 2002. The boys' cross country team won a state championship in 1995. The girls' basketball team won state championships in 1991, 1992, 1993, 1994, 2015, 2023, and 2025. The boys' basketball team won state championships in 1990 and 1994, and were runners-up in 1974, 1976, 1986, 1989 and 1999. The girls' outdoor track team won their first title in 2013, at the KVAC Championships, and came in fourth at States. The 1987 boys' baseball team, led by captains Kurt Squiers and Mike Brown, and coached by Mike Mealey, was the school's first team to ever win the Central Maine Championship, and went on to become runners-up in the school's first ever state championship appearance, losing to Portland. Their field hockey team also won the state championships in 2022, the first ever win for the high school.

== Notable events ==
On April 24, 2019, approximately 300 students participated in a walkout in protest of the resignation of Principal Mark Campbell, who was given a settlement in return for his resignation. Students gathered at the office of Superintendent Reza Namin, who resigned that summer following backlash over a restructuring plan. They carried signs and stood in rain for forty-five minutes while teachers watched from classrooms.

Following the protest, a school board meeting was held. After pressure from the public, School Board Chairwoman Shelley Rudnicki and Vice Chairman Tim Martin were ousted from their roles, but remained on the board.

Superintendent Reza Namin resigned prior to the beginning of the 2019-2020 academic year, after less than one year in his role.

== Notable alumni ==
- Bruce Bickford, former U.S. Olympic 10,000 meter runner
- Cindy Blodgett, former WNBA player, and former University of Maine women's basketball coach.
- Brian L. Buker, Congressional Medal of Honor recipient, sergeant, U.S. Army - Republic of Vietnam 1970
- Mike Cowan, PGA Tour caddy
- Dan Gwadosky, Maine politician and former president of Lawrence High alumni association
- Christopher Thomas Knight, the "North Pond Hermit"
