= The Forks, Maine =

- Plantation
- Location within Maine Location within the United States
- Coordinates: 45°18′09″N 69°52′50″W
- Country: United States
- State: Maine
- County: Somerset

Area
  - Total: 41.5 sq mi (107.4 km^{2})
  - Land: 39.6 sq mi (102.6 km^{2})
  - Water: 1.9 sq mi (4.8 km^{2})
- Elevation: 1,431 ft (436 m)

Population (2020)
  - Total: 48
  - Density: 0.78/sq mi (0.3/km^{2})
- Time zone: UTC-5 (Eastern (EST))
  - Summer (DST): UTC-4 (EDT)
- ZIP Code: 04985
- Area code: 207
- FIPS code: 23-76190
- GNIS feature ID: 582762
- Website: theforksplt.org

The Forks is a plantation in Somerset County, Maine, United States. The population was 48 at the 2020 census.

== Geography ==
According to the United States Census Bureau, the plantation has a total area of 41.5 square miles (107 km^{2}), of which 39.6 square miles (103 km^{2}) is land and 1.9 square miles (4.9 km^{2}) (4.46%) is water. The plantation contains the convergence of the Dead River and Kennebec River. The Appalachian Trail passes through the southern part of the plantation.

== Demographics ==
Historical population
Census	Pop.	Note	%±
1900	157		—
1910	169		7.6%
1920	153		−9.5%
1930	144		−5.9%
1940	123		−14.6%
1950	45		−63.4%
1960	53		17.8%
1970	45		−15.1%
1980	72		60.0%
1990	30		−58.3%
2000	35		16.7%
2010	37		5.7%
2020	48		29.7%
U.S. Decennial Census

As of the census of 2000, there were 35 people, 17 households, and 12 families residing in the plantation. The population density was 0.9 people per square mile (0.35 people/km^{2}). There were 383 housing units at an average density of 9.7 per square mile (3.7/km^{2}). The racial makeup of the plantation was 100.00% White.

There were 17 households, out of which 23.5% had children under the age of 18 living with them, 52.9% were married couples living together, 11.8% had a female householder with no husband present, and 29.4% were non-families. Of all households 23.5% were made up of individuals, and none had someone living alone who was 65 years of age or older. The average household size was 2.06 and the average family size was 2.33.

In the plantation the population was spread out, with 17.1% under the age of 18, 2.9% from 18 to 24, 17.1% from 25 to 44, 51.4% from 45 to 64, and 11.4% who were 65 years of age or older. The median age was 50 years. For every 100 females, there were 105.9 males. For every 100 females age 18 and over, there were 123.1 males.

The median income for a household in the plantation was $37,083, and the median income for a family was $41,667. Males had a median income of $31,250 versus $28,750 for females. The per capita income for the plantation was $29,362. None of the population and none of the families were below the poverty line.
