= Maine School Administrative District 7 =

School district in Maine, United States

Coordinates: 44.154167°N 68.878056°W

Maine School Administrative District 7 (MSAD 7) is an operating school district within the U.S. state of Maine, covering the town of North Haven. The district contains one K-12 school, North Haven Community School.
