= Weston, Maine =

Town in Maine, United States

- Town
- Location in Aroostook County and the state of Maine
- Coordinates: 45°44′17″N 67°52′18″W
- Country: United States
- State: Maine
- County: Aroostook
- Villages: Weston; Butterfield Landing

Area
  - Total: 40.55 sq mi (105.02 km^{2})
  - Land: 30.61 sq mi (79.28 km^{2})
  - Water: 9.94 sq mi (25.74 km^{2})
- Elevation: 466 ft (142 m)

Population (2020)
  - Total: 245
  - Density: 8.0/sq mi (3.1/km^{2})
- Time zone: UTC-5 (Eastern (EST))
  - Summer (DST): UTC-4 (EDT)
- ZIP Code: 04424
- Area code: 207
- FIPS code: 23-83785
- GNIS feature ID: 582808
- Website: http://townofweston.net/

Weston is a town in Aroostook County, Maine, United States. The population was 245 at the 2020 census.

== Geography ==
According to the United States Census Bureau, the town has a total area of 40.55 square miles (105.02 km^{2}), of which 30.61 square miles (79.28 km^{2}) is land and 9.94 square miles (25.74 km^{2}) is water.

== Demographics ==
Historical population
Census	Pop.	Note	%±
1840	249		—
1850	293		17.7%
1860	394		34.5%
1870	394		0.0%
1880	417		5.8%
1890	404		−3.1%
1900	367		−9.2%
1910	390		6.3%
1920	433		11.0%
1930	323		−25.4%
1940	328		1.5%
1950	248		−24.4%
1960	202		−18.5%
1970	162		−19.8%
1980	155		−4.3%
1990	207		33.5%
2000	203		−1.9%
2010	228		12.3%
2020	245		7.5%
U.S. Decennial Census

=== 2010 census ===
As of the census of 2010, there were 228 people, 112 households, and 68 families living in the town. The population density was 7.4 inhabitants per square mile (2.9/km^{2}). There were 369 housing units at an average density of 12.1 per square mile (4.7/km^{2}). The racial makeup of the town was 95.2% White, 0.4% African American, 0.9% Native American, 0.9% Asian, and 2.6% from two or more races. Hispanic or Latino of any race were 1.8% of the population.

There were 112 households, of which 14.3% had children under the age of 18 living with them, 52.7% were married couples living together, 3.6% had a female householder with no husband present, 4.5% had a male householder with no wife present, and 39.3% were non-families. 33.9% of all households were made up of individuals, and 16.1% had someone living alone who was 65 years of age or older. The average household size was 2.04 and the average family size was 2.56.

The median age in the town was 51.6 years. 12.3% of residents were under the age of 18; 5.8% were between the ages of 18 and 24; 16.6% were from 25 to 44; 39.5% were from 45 to 64; and 25.9% were 65 years of age or older. The gender makeup of the town was 54.4% male and 45.6% female.

=== 2000 census ===
Languages (2000)	Percent
Spoke English at home	100.00%

As of the census of 2000, there were 203 people, 89 households, and 63 families living in the town. The population density was 6.7 people per square mile (2.6/km^{2}). There were 311 housing units at an average density of 10.2 per square mile (3.9/km^{2}). The racial makeup of the town was 98.52% White, 0.49% African American, 0.49% Native American, 0.49% from other races.

There were 89 households, out of which 28.1% had children under the age of 18 living with them, 56.2% were married couples living together, 5.6% had a female householder with no husband present, and 29.2% were non-families. 21.3% of all households were made up of individuals, and 7.9% had someone living alone who was 65 years of age or older. The average household size was 2.28 and the average family size was 2.60.

In the town, the population was spread out, with 23.2% under the age of 18, 4.4% from 18 to 24, 29.6% from 25 to 44, 32.0% from 45 to 64, and 10.8% who were 65 years of age or older. The median age was 41 years. For every 100 females, there were 116.0 males. For every 100 females age 18 and over, there were 110.8 males.

The median income for a household in the town was $21,429, and the median income for a family was $25,000. Males had a median income of $24,583 versus $15,625 for females. The per capita income for the town was $11,493. About 29.7% of families and 34.5% of the population were below the poverty line, including 50.0% of those under the age of eighteen and 25.0% of those 65 or over.

== History ==
The town of Weston was incorporated in 1835 and was supposedly named for "the man who surveyed the town in 1835" whose full name is unknown.

== Education ==
It is in School Administrative District 14, also known as Regional School Unit 84. The district has a single PreKindergarten to Grade 12 school, East Grand School.

== See also ==
- Butterfield Landing
