= Knox, Maine =

Town in Maine, United States

- Town
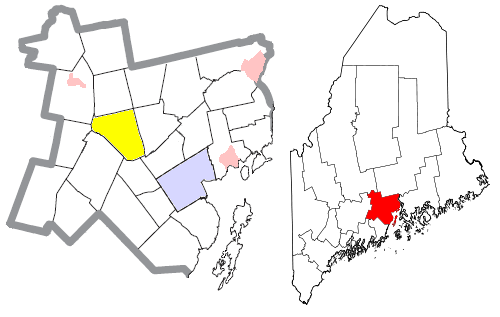
- Location of Knox (in yellow) in Waldo County and the state of Maine
- Coordinates: 44°31′02″N 69°13′49″W
- Country: United States
- State: Maine
- County: Waldo

Area
  - Total: 29.17 sq mi (75.55 km^{2})
  - Land: 28.97 sq mi (75.03 km^{2})
  - Water: 0.20 sq mi (0.52 km^{2})
- Elevation: 850 ft (260 m)

Population (2020)
  - Total: 811
  - Density: 28/sq mi (10.8/km^{2})
- Time zone: UTC-5 (Eastern (EST))
  - Summer (DST): UTC-4 (EDT)
- ZIP code: 04986
- Area code: 207
- FIPS code: 23-37585
- GNIS feature ID: 582545
- Website: knoxmaine.com

Knox is a town in Waldo County, Maine, United States. The town was named for General Henry Knox, the first United States Secretary of War. The population was 811 at the 2020 census.

== Geography ==
According to the United States Census Bureau, the town has a total area of 29.17 square miles (75.55 km^{2}), of which 28.97 square miles (75.03 km^{2}) is land and 0.20 square miles (0.52 km^{2}) is water. The town is drained by Marsh Stream and Halfmoon Stream. The town is crossed by state routes SR 137, SR 220 and SR 139. It is bordered by the towns of Thorndike to the north, Brooks to the east, Morrill to the southeast, Montville to the southwest, Freedom to the west and Unity to the northwest. Principal bodies of water include Mixer Pond (48 acres) and Dutton Pond (41 acres).

Knox is home to part of Frye Mountain Wildlife Management Area.

== Demographics ==
Historical population
Census	Pop.	Note	%±
1810	414		—
1820	560		35.3%
1830	666		18.9%
1840	897		34.7%
1850	1,102		22.9%
1860	1,074		−2.5%
1870	889		−17.2%
1880	852		−4.2%
1890	657		−22.9%
1900	558		−15.1%
1910	511		−8.4%
1920	532		4.1%
1930	509		−4.3%
1940	471		−7.5%
1950	445		−5.5%
1960	439		−1.3%
1970	443		0.9%
1980	558		26.0%
1990	681		22.0%
2000	747		9.7%
2010	806		7.9%
2020	811		0.6%
U.S. Decennial Census

=== 2010 census ===
As of the census of 2010, there were 806 people, 313 households, and 223 families living in the town. The population density was 27.8 inhabitants per square mile (10.7/km^{2}). There were 382 housing units at an average density of 13.2 per square mile (5.1/km^{2}). The racial makeup of the town was 96.7% White, 1.4% Asian, 0.2% Pacific Islander, 1.0% from other races, and 0.7% from two or more races. Hispanic or Latino of any race were 1.0% of the population.

There were 313 households, of which 35.5% had children under the age of 18 living with them, 55.3% were married couples living together, 9.9% had a female householder with no husband present, 6.1% had a male householder with no wife present, and 28.8% were non-families. 20.1% of all households were made up of individuals, and 9.3% had someone living alone who was 65 years of age or older. The average household size was 2.58 and the average family size was 2.91.

The median age in the town was 39.6 years. 23.1% of residents were under the age of 18; 8% were between the ages of 18 and 24; 26.2% were from 25 to 44; 30.6% were from 45 to 64; and 12% were 65 years of age or older. The gender makeup of the town was 48.8% male and 51.2% female.

=== 2000 census ===
As of the census of 2000, there were 747 people, 283 households, and 208 families living in the town. The population density was 25.6 people per square mile (9.9 people/km^{2}). There were 324 housing units at an average density of 11.1 per square mile (4.3/km^{2}). The racial makeup of the town was 99.46% White, 0.13% African American, and 0.40% from two or more races. Hispanic or Latino of any race were 0.40% of the population.

There were 283 households, out of which 38.9% had children under the age of 18 living with them, 62.2% were married couples living together, 8.5% had a female householder with no husband present, and 26.5% were non-families. 20.5% of all households were made up of individuals, and 8.1% had someone living alone who was 65 years of age or older. The average household size was 2.64 and the average family size was 3.06.

In the town, the population was spread out, with 27.7% under the age of 18, 6.6% from 18 to 24, 30.5% from 25 to 44, 21.8% from 45 to 64, and 13.4% who were 65 years of age or older. The median age was 37 years. For every 100 females, there were 100.3 males. For every 100 females age 18 and over, there were 101.5 males.

The median income for a household in the town was $33,333, and the median income for a family was $39,107. Males had a median income of $26,179 versus $22,386 for females. The per capita income for the town was $14,468. About 10.7% of families and 13.2% of the population were below the poverty line, including 11.6% of those under age 18 and 21.9% of those age 65 or over.

== Education ==
Knox is part of Regional School Unit No. 3. There are six elementary schools, a middle school and a high school in the district.
