= Stoneham, Maine =

Town in Maine, United States

- Town
- Location within Maine Location within the United States
- Coordinates: 44°15′24″N 70°53′18″W
- Country: United States
- State: Maine
- County: Oxford

Area
  - Total: 34.74 sq mi (89.98 km^{2})
  - Land: 33.83 sq mi (87.62 km^{2})
  - Water: 0.91 sq mi (2.36 km^{2})
- Elevation: 469 ft (143 m)

Population (2020)
  - Total: 261
  - Density: 7.8/sq mi (3/km^{2})
- Time zone: UTC-5 (Eastern (EST))
  - Summer (DST): UTC-4 (EDT)
- ZIP code: 04231
- Area code: 207
- FIPS code: 23-74510
- GNIS feature ID: 582750
- Website: stoneham-maine.com/default.html

Stoneham is a town in Oxford County, Maine, United States. The population was 261 at the 2020 census.

== Geography ==
According to the United States Census Bureau, the town has a total area of 34.74 square miles (89.98 km^{2}), of which 33.83 square miles (87.62 km^{2}) is land and 0.91 square miles (2.36 km^{2}) is water.

== Demographics ==
Historical population
| Census | Pop. | Note | %± |
|---|---|---|---|
| 1840 | 313 | | — |
| 1850 | 484 | | 54.6% |
| 1860 | 463 | | −4.3% |
| 1870 | 425 | | −8.2% |
| 1880 | 475 | | 11.8% |
| 1890 | 322 | | −32.2% |
| 1900 | 284 | | −11.8% |
| 1910 | 253 | | −10.9% |
| 1920 | 196 | | −22.5% |
| 1930 | 164 | | −16.3% |
| 1940 | 238 | | 45.1% |
| 1950 | 216 | | −9.2% |
| 1960 | 182 | | −15.7% |
| 1970 | 160 | | −12.1% |
| 1980 | 204 | | 27.5% |
| 1990 | 224 | | 9.8% |
| 2000 | 255 | | 13.8% |
| 2010 | 236 | | −7.5% |
| 2020 | 261 | | 10.6% |
U.S. Decennial Census

=== 2010 census ===
As of the census of 2010, there were 236 people, 110 households, and 68 families living in the town. The population density was 7.0 inhabitants per square mile (2.7/km^{2}). There were 344 housing units at an average density of 10.2 per square mile (3.9/km^{2}). The racial makeup of the town was 99.6% White and 0.4% from two or more races. Hispanic or Latino of any race were 0.4% of the population.

There were 110 households, of which 17.3% had children under the age of 18 living with them, 50.9% were married couples living together, 3.6% had a female householder with no husband present, 7.3% had a male householder with no wife present, and 38.2% were non-families. 30.9% of all households were made up of individuals, and 10% had someone living alone who was 65 years of age or older. The average household size was 2.15 and the average family size was 2.71.

The median age in the town was 47.3 years. 17.4% of residents were under the age of 18; 4.3% were between the ages of 18 and 24; 22.9% were from 25 to 44; 39.9% were from 45 to 64; and 15.7% were 65 years of age or older. The gender makeup of the town was 52.1% male and 47.9% female.

=== 2000 census ===
As of the census of 2000, there were 255 people, 113 households, and 81 families living in the town. The population density was 7.1 people per square mile (2.8/km^{2}). There were 351 housing units at an average density of 9.8 per square mile (3.8/km^{2}). The racial makeup of the town was 98.04% White, 0.78% Native American, 0.39% Asian, and 0.78% from two or more races.

There were 113 households, out of which 22.1% had children under the age of 18 living with them, 62.8% were married couples living together, 5.3% had a female householder with no husband present, and 28.3% were non-families. 23.0% of all households were made up of individuals, and 10.6% had someone living alone who was 65 years of age or older. The average household size was 2.26 and the average family size was 2.63.

In the town, the population was spread out, with 16.1% under the age of 18, 4.3% from 18 to 24, 27.8% from 25 to 44, 29.0% from 45 to 64, and 22.7% who were 65 years of age or older. The median age was 46 years. For every 100 females, there were 97.7 males. For every 100 females age 18 and over, there were 100.0 males.

The median income for a household in the town was $38,611, and the median income for a family was $40,625. Males had a median income of $26,071 versus $22,250 for females. The per capita income for the town was $25,038. About 11.8% of families and 16.6% of the population were below the poverty line, including 32.7% of those under the age of eighteen and 18.9% of those 65 or over.
