= Hammond, Maine =

Town in Maine, United States

- Town
- Location of Hammond, Maine
- Coordinates: 46°14′42″N 67°59′22″W
- Country: United States
- State: Maine
- County: Aroostook

Area
  - Total: 39.18 sq mi (101.48 km^{2})
  - Land: 39.06 sq mi (101.16 km^{2})
  - Water: 0.12 sq mi (0.31 km^{2})
- Elevation: 728 ft (222 m)

Population (2020)
  - Total: 91
  - Density: 2.3/sq mi (0.9/km^{2})
- Time zone: UTC-5 (Eastern (EST))
  - Summer (DST): UTC-4 (EDT)
- ZIP code: 04730
- Area code: 207
- FIPS code: 23-30725
- GNIS feature ID: 582507

Hammond is a town in Aroostook County, Maine, United States. The population was 91 at the 2020 census.

== Geography ==
According to the United States Census Bureau, the town has a total area of 39.18 square miles (101.48 km^{2}), of which 39.06 square miles (101.16 km^{2}) is land and 0.12 square miles (0.31 km^{2}) is water.

== Demographics ==
Historical population
Census	Pop.	Note	%±
1880	87		—
1890	109		25.3%
1900	116		6.4%
1910	115		−0.9%
1920	132		14.8%
1930	95		−28.0%
1940	108		13.7%
1950	120		11.1%
1960	94		−21.7%
1970	73		−22.3%
1980	73		0.0%
1990	93		27.4%
2000	98		5.4%
2010	118		20.4%
2020	91		−22.9%
U.S. Decennial Census

=== 2010 census ===
As of the census of 2010, there were 118 people, 41 households, and 29 families living in the town. The population density was 3.0 inhabitants per square mile (1.2/km^{2}). There were 62 housing units at an average density of 1.6 per square mile (0.6/km^{2}). The racial makeup of the town was 86.4% White, 1.7% African American, 0.8% Asian, and 11.0% from two or more races. Hispanic or Latino of any race were 0.8% of the population.

There were 41 households, of which 36.6% had children under the age of 18 living with them, 48.8% were married couples living together, 17.1% had a female householder with no husband present, 4.9% had a male householder with no wife present, and 29.3% were non-families. 17.1% of all households were made up of individuals, and 14.6% had someone living alone who was 65 years of age or older. The average household size was 2.88 and the average family size was 3.38.

The median age in the town was 40 years. 28.8% of residents were under the age of 18; 5% were between the ages of 18 and 24; 21.2% were from 25 to 44; 31.3% were from 45 to 64; and 13.6% were 65 years of age or older. The gender makeup of the town was 44.1% male and 55.9% female.

=== 2000 census ===
As of the census of 2000, there were 98 people, 33 households, and 25 families living in the town. The population density was 2.5 inhabitants per square mile (0.97/km^{2}). There were 77 housing units at an average density of 2.0 per square mile (0.77/km^{2}). The racial makeup of the town was 95.92% White and 4.08% Native American.

There were 33 households, out of which 42.4% had children under the age of 18 living with them, 60.6% were married couples living together, 12.1% had a female householder with no husband present, and 24.2% were non-families. 21.2% of all households were made up of individuals, and 12.1% had someone living alone who was 65 years of age or older. The average household size was 2.97 and the average family size was 3.40.

In the town, the population was spread out, with 30.6% under the age of 18, 6.1% from 18 to 24, 25.5% from 25 to 44, 29.6% from 45 to 64, and 8.2% who were 65 years of age or older. The median age was 37 years. For every 100 females, there were 113.0 males. For every 100 females age 18 and over, there were 94.3 males.

The median income for a household in the town was $31,000, and the median income for a family was $30,750. Males had a median income of $27,083 versus $23,125 for females. The per capita income for the town was $11,957. There were no families and 4.4% of the population living below the poverty line, including no under eighteens and 36.4% of those over 64.
