= Regional School Unit 68 =

School district in Piscataquis County, Maine, United States

Location
- Coordinates: 45°11′N 69°17′W

Other information
- Website: sedomocha.org

Regional School Unit 68 (RSU 68), formerly known as Maine School Administrative District 68 or MSAD 68, consists of two public schools in Dover-Foxcroft, Maine. The district serves the towns of Dover-Foxcroft, Monson, Sebec, Charleston, and smaller communities. Students are often bussed in from these outlying towns. It is the largest of four school districts in Piscataquis County. Dover-Foxcroft has since become a hub for MSAD 68, as Monson was the final town outside Dover-Foxcroft to have a school in the district until the end of the 2008–2009 school year, when Monson Elementary was closed due to declining enrollment. The building that once housed Monson Elementary has now become the Monson Center.

== Former schools ==
The smaller communities in MSAD68 had several schools prior to and during the MSAD era. These included several one room schoolhouses until regional schools became more popular. Monson, for instance had approximately eight neighborhood schools until transportation became improved. Most of these schoolhouses were closed by 1939 after which most students were bussed to a school located centrally in each town.

Monson had its own high school known then as Monson Academy from 1848 until 1967. Although not technically a part of MSAD 68 during its lifetime (which spanned over 100 years), graduates of Foxcroft Academy from Monson are essentially both Monson Academy and Foxcroft Academy graduates — although no degree or ceremony is given by Monson Academy. However a number of grants and trusts are awarded from the Alumni. Monson Elementary became the only school in Monson in 1982 and had an addition built in 1994 however the school is closed as of the 2008-2009 school year. The building that once housed Monson Elementary has now become the Monson Center.

Charleston Elementary School was a school located in Charleston until it fell into disrepair, and the funds to build a new building were not adequate.

Morton Elementary School which was located in Dover-Foxcroft included K-3 students. This school closed in 2009 after the addition of the elementary school wing at SeDoMoCha. Currently the building is used as the town offices of Dover-Foxcroft, a community center, job center, and adult education center among other things.

Mayo Street Elementary School was a "transition" elementary school. This school was set up for 4th & 5th graders in Dover-Foxcroft. This school closed after 5th grade students were bussed to SeDoMoCha as well.

== SeDoMoCha Elementary and Middle School ==
Currently this is the only school in MSAD68 and has students from Sebec, Dover-Foxcroft, Monson, and Charleston and other smaller communities including but not limited to Bowerbank. The school teaches pre-K through 8th grade.

== Foxcroft Academy ==
MSAD68 sends all high school students to Foxcroft Academy, a private secondary school.

Founded in 1823, the school also accepts students from other Maine communities and states, as well as international boarding students. A new addition of dormitory rooms allows for these international and other boarding students to reside on campus.
