= Regional School Unit 40 =

School district in Maine, United States

Address
- 1070 Heald Highway Union, Maine, 04862; United States
- Coordinates: 44°8′N 69°20′W

District information
- Interim Superintendent of Schools: Thomas Ambrose
- Asst. superintendent(s): Tom Gray
- NCES District ID: 2311550

Other information
- Website: rsu40.org

Regional School Unit 40 (RSU#40), formerly known as Maine School Administrative District #40, is a school district headquartered on the second floor of Union Elementary School in Union, Maine. MSAD 40 comprises the public education services for students in Union, Friendship, Waldoboro, Warren, and Washington.

The superintendent's office and adult education programs moved to Union Elementary School from the Educational Services Center in Warren starting with the 2008–09 school year.

== Schools ==
- Waldoboro:
  - Medomak Valley High School — Grades 9–12
  - Medomak Valley Middle School — Grades 6-8
  - Miller Elementary School — Grades K–5
- Warren:
  - Warren Community School — Grades K–5
- Washington:
  - Prescott Memorial School — Grades K–5
- Union:
  - Union Elementary School — Grades K–5 - Located on the first floor of its building
- Friendship:
  - Friendship Village School — Grades K–5

Alternative:

- Rivers Alternative Middle School (Union) - On the second floor of Union Elementary

== Board elections ==
Transgender rights were an issue during recent board elections.
