= Jackson, Maine =

Town in Maine, United States

- Town
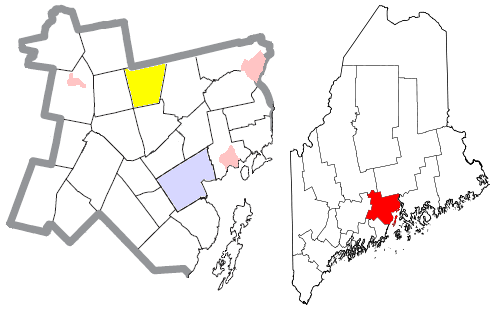
- Location of Jackson (in yellow) in Waldo County and the state of Maine
- Coordinates: 44°37′12″N 69°07′49″W
- Country: United States
- State: Maine
- County: Waldo

Area
  - Total: 25.36 sq mi (65.68 km^{2})
  - Land: 25.26 sq mi (65.42 km^{2})
  - Water: 0.10 sq mi (0.26 km^{2})
- Elevation: 495 ft (151 m)

Population (2020)
  - Total: 610
  - Density: 24/sq mi (9.3/km^{2})
- Time zone: UTC-5 (Eastern (EST))
  - Summer (DST): UTC-4 (EDT)
- ZIP code: 04921
- Area code: 207
- FIPS code: 23-35450
- GNIS feature ID: 582533
- Website: www.jacksonmaine.org

Jackson is a town in Waldo County, Maine, United States. The town was named after General Henry Jackson of the Revolutionary War. The population was 610 at the 2020 census.

== Geography ==
According to the United States Census Bureau, the town has a total area of 25.36 square miles (65.68 km^{2}), of which 25.26 square miles (65.42 km^{2}) is land and 0.10 square miles (0.26 km^{2}) is water. Jackson is drained by North Branch Marsh Stream. It has one pond, Drake Pond (13 acres).

Jackson is located on Route 7, south of U.S. Route 202. It is bordered on the north by Dixmont, on the east by Monroe, on the south by Brooks and on the west by Thondike.

The topography is hilly, with high points at over 1,200 feet (370 m) on Mount Harris and other peaks to the north, remnants of the Appalachian chain. The land area of the township is mostly forested, primarily a second growth northern mixed hardwood forest dominated by ash, poplar, oak, maple, pine, cedar, spruce, tamarack (larch) and hemlock. Forestry and livestock farming are the largest land uses, with hay the most common crop, corn silage the second most common. There are areas that have never been managed or cultivated, particularly bogs and remnant primeval forest in which large pine, hemlock and spruce trees predominate.

== Demographics ==
Historical population
Census	Pop.	Note	%±
1810	275		—
1820	385		40.0%
1830	493		28.1%
1840	653		32.5%
1850	833		27.6%
1860	827		−0.7%
1870	707		−14.5%
1880	682		−3.5%
1890	522		−23.5%
1900	439		−15.9%
1910	416		−5.2%
1920	353		−15.1%
1930	241		−31.7%
1940	299		24.1%
1950	258		−13.7%
1960	220		−14.7%
1970	217		−1.4%
1980	346		59.4%
1990	415		19.9%
2000	506		21.9%
2010	548		8.3%
2020	610		11.3%
U.S. Decennial Census

=== 2010 census ===
As of the census of 2010, there were 548 people, 237 households, and 152 families residing in the town. The population density was 21.7 inhabitants per square mile (8.4/km^{2}). There were 272 housing units at an average density of 10.8 per square mile (4.2/km^{2}). The racial makeup of the town was 95.6% White, 0.2% African American, 1.3% Native American, 0.2% Asian, and 2.7% from two or more races. Hispanic or Latino of any race were 0.4% of the population.

There were 237 households, of which 27.0% had children under the age of 18 living with them, 50.6% were married couples living together, 7.6% had a female householder with no husband present, 5.9% had a male householder with no wife present, and 35.9% were non-families. 29.1% of all households were made up of individuals, and 9.3% had someone living alone who was 65 years of age or older. The average household size was 2.31 and the average family size was 2.80.

The median age in the town was 44.6 years. 19.9% of residents were under the age of 18; 6.7% were between the ages of 18 and 24; 23.9% were from 25 to 44; 36.4% were from 45 to 64; and 13% were 65 years of age or older. The gender makeup of the town was 50.7% male and 49.3% female.

=== 2000 census ===
As of the census of 2000, there were 506 people, 204 households, and 135 families residing in the town. The population density was 20.1 inhabitants per square mile (7.8/km^{2}). There were 241 housing units at an average density of 9.6 per square mile (3.7/km^{2}). The racial makeup of the town was 97.23% White, 0.99% Native American, and 1.78% from two or more races. Hispanic or Latino of any race were 0.40% of the population.

There were 204 households, out of which 34.3% had children under the age of 18 living with them, 52.9% were married couples living together, 8.8% had a female householder with no husband present, and 33.8% were non-families. 26.5% of all households were made up of individuals, and 7.4% had someone living alone who was 65 years of age or older. The average household size was 2.48 and the average family size was 2.96.

In the town, the population was spread out, with 26.7% under the age of 18, 6.7% from 18 to 24, 29.2% from 25 to 44, 28.9% from 45 to 64, and 8.5% who were 65 years of age or older. The median age was 38 years. For every 100 females, there were 100.8 males. For every 100 females age 18 and over, there were 95.3 males.

The median income for a household in the town was $26,705, and the median income for a family was $38,571. Males had a median income of $27,159 versus $20,000 for females. The per capita income for the town was $15,525. About 15.2% of families and 21.0% of the population were below the poverty line, including 19.0% of those under age 18 and 18.4% of those age 65 or over.

== Notable people ==
- Ezra Abbot (1819–1884), noted biblical scholar
- David Augustus Boody (1837–1930), mayor of Brooklyn, NY, 1892–1893
