= Regional School Unit 74 =

School district in Somerset County, Maine, United States

Other information
- Website: www.carrabec.org

Regional School Unit 74 (RSU 74), formerly Maine School Administrative District 74 (MSAD 74), is an operating school district within Somerset County, Maine, United States, covering the towns of Anson, Embden, New Portland, North Anson and Solon.

== Schools ==
- Carrabec High School
- Carrabec Community School
- Garret Schenck Elementary School
- Solon Elementary School
