= East Grand School =

School in Danforth, Maine, United States

Coordinates: 45.6611°N 67.8627°W

East Grand School is a public PK-12 school in Danforth, Maine, United States. It is part of the Maine School Administrative District 14, also known as Regional School Unit 84. The district includes the Town of Danforth in Washington County, as well as the Town of Weston in Aroostook County.

== History ==
A school building opened in 1960. At the time, it did not have facilities for handicapped students.

In 1992 William Grant became the principal of East Grand School. That year, a $250,000 grant was used to fix the school's roof.

In 1992, the school district tried to get the state of Maine to facilitate a new school building, as it would be more cost effective, but the state told the school to have the repairs done as the school building was repairable. That year, engineers stated that the repairing cost of the school would be $2 million, and Central Insurance Company stated that it was pondering reducing or ending the school's insurance coverage. The estimated cost of a new school facility would have been some hundreds of thousands of dollars above the total repair cost.

In 2000 the school received a program in which students could get live instruction from a teacher in Houlton.

In 2003, voters approved $55,000 to make the gymnasium handicapped-accessible to comply with laws from the federal government.

In 2023 enrollment was 135, including 46 in high school.

== Catchment ==
In addition to the towns directly in the school district, the school also has some students from Vanceboro; Vanceboro's high school closed in 1967.

The Maine Department of Education takes responsibility for coordinating school assignments in the unorganized territories. As of 2025 the state assigns Bancroft to the East Grand School, and it also lists East Grand as an option for Brookton.

In 1973 some Topsfield students went to East Grand for high school.
