= Maine School Administrative District 8 =

School district in Vinalhaven, Maine, United States

Coordinates: 44.048056°N 68.831667°W

Maine School Administrative District 8 (MSAD 8) is an operating school district within Maine, covering the town of Vinalhaven. The district contains one K-12 school, Vinalhaven School.
