= Maine School Administrative District 53 =

School district in Maine, United States

District information
- Superintendent: Sherry Littlefield

Other information
- Website: www.msad53.org

Maine School Administrative District 53 (MSAD 53) is an operating school district in the U.S. state of Maine, covering the towns of Burnham, Detroit and Pittsfield. The district contains Warsaw Middle School (5-8), Vickery School (1-4), and Manson Park School (PK-K). It also governs Maine Central Institute.
