= Maine School Administrative District 59 =

School district in Somerset County, Maine, United States

Location
- 205 Main Street Madison, Maine, 04950; United States
- Coordinates: 44.7980°N 69.8748°W

District information
- Interim superintendent of schools: Ryan Arnold
- NCES District ID: 2314560

Other information
- Website: www.msad59.org

Maine School Administrative District 59 (MSAD 59) is an operating school district within Somerset County, Maine, United States, covering the town of Madison. The district contains Madison Jr./Sr. High School, Main Street Middle School, and Madison Elementary School.

Madison (SAD 59) is currently proposing a consolidation with SAD 74 in neighboring Anson, and SAD 53 located in the Pittsfield, Maine area. SAD 59 has proposed consolidations with both districts in different proposals voters rejected both. SAD 59 is also in the process of consolidating its school sports programs (middle/junior high and high school) with SAD 74 and SAD 13 in the Bingham srea to save money, fuel and travel costs.

The towns of Athens and Brighton Plantation voted to leave District 59 in May 2013, and are now part of the AOS 94 School District.
