= Maine School Administrative District 28 =

School district in Knox County, Maine, USA

Address
- 7 Lions Lane Camden, Maine, 04843; United States

District information
- Grades: K–8
- Superintendent: Maria Libby
- NCES District ID: 2311130

Students and staff
- Students: 719
- Teachers: 64.6
- Staff: 138.3
- Student–teacher ratio: 11.13

Other information
- Website: sad.fivetowns.net

Maine School Administrative District 28 (Camden Rockport Schools) is a K-8 school district headquartered in Camden, Maine, serving both Camden and Rockport. It operates Camden Rockport Elementary School (CRES) and Camden Rockport Middle School (CRMS).

It feeds into Camden Hills Regional High School of the Five Town Community School District.
