= Monroe, Maine =

Town in Maine, United States

- Town
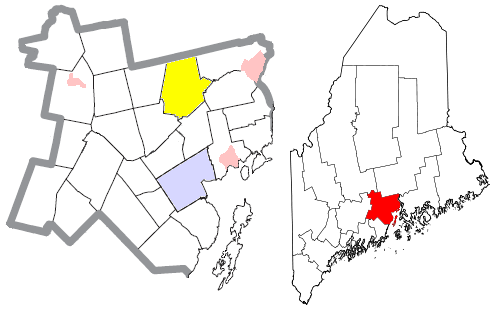
- Location of Monroe (in yellow) in Waldo County and the state of Maine
- Coordinates: 44°37′30″N 69°01′24″W
- Country: United States
- State: Maine
- County: Waldo

Area
  - Total: 39.03 sq mi (101.09 km^{2})
  - Land: 38.92 sq mi (100.80 km^{2})
  - Water: 0.11 sq mi (0.28 km^{2})
- Elevation: 312 ft (95 m)

Population (2020)
  - Total: 931
  - Density: 24/sq mi (9.2/km^{2})
- Time zone: UTC-5 (Eastern (EST))
  - Summer (DST): UTC-4 (EDT)
- ZIP code: 04951
- Area code: 207
- FIPS code: 23-46475
- GNIS feature ID: 582602
- Website: townofmonroe.me

Monroe is a town in Waldo County, Maine, United States named for President James Monroe. The population was 931 at the 2020 census.

== Geography ==
According to the United States Census Bureau, the town has a total area of 39.03 square miles (101.09 km^{2}), of which 38.92 square miles (100.80 km^{2}) is land and 0.11 square miles (0.28 km^{2}) is water. Principal bodies of water include: Chase Bog Pond (67 acres), Basin Pond (28 acres), Lily Pond (27 acres), Thistle Pond (16 acres) and Northern Pond (15 acres).

Monroe is located at the intersection of Routes 139 and 141. It is bordered on the north by Newburgh, on the east by Winterport and Frankfort, one the south by Swanville, on the southwest by Brooks, on the west by Jackson and on the northwest by Dixmont.

== Demographics ==
Historical population
Census	Pop.	Note	%±
1820	732		—
1830	1,080		47.5%
1840	1,602		48.3%
1850	1,606		0.2%
1860	1,703		6.0%
1870	1,375		−19.3%
1880	1,366		−0.7%
1890	1,079		−21.0%
1900	958		−11.2%
1910	872		−9.0%
1920	734		−15.8%
1930	671		−8.6%
1940	665		−0.9%
1950	593		−10.8%
1960	497		−16.2%
1970	478		−3.8%
1980	657		37.4%
1990	802		22.1%
2000	882		10.0%
2010	890		0.9%
2020	931		4.6%
U.S. Decennial Census

=== 2010 census ===
As of the census of 2010, there were 890 people, 402 households, and 247 families living in the town. The population density was 22.9 inhabitants per square mile (8.8/km^{2}). There were 461 housing units at an average density of 11.8 per square mile (4.6/km^{2}). The racial makeup of the town was 97.6% White, 0.2% African American, 0.2% Asian, and 1.9% from two or more races. Hispanic or Latino of any race were 1.2% of the population.

There were 402 households, of which 22.6% had children under the age of 18 living with them, 49.0% were married couples living together, 9.2% had a female householder with no husband present, 3.2% had a male householder with no wife present, and 38.6% were non-families. 30.3% of all households were made up of individuals, and 11% had someone living alone who was 65 years of age or older. The average household size was 2.21 and the average family size was 2.77.

The median age in the town was 47.5 years. 17.8% of residents were under the age of 18; 4.9% were between the ages of 18 and 24; 23% were from 25 to 44; 38.3% were from 45 to 64; and 16.1% were 65 years of age or older. The gender makeup of the town was 49.9% male and 50.1% female.

=== 2000 census ===
As of the census of 2000, there were 882 people, 355 households, and 237 families living in the town. The population density was 22.7 people per square mile (8.8/km^{2}). There were 421 housing units at an average density of 10.8 per square mile (4.2/km^{2}). The racial makeup of the town was 98.87% White, 0.11% African American, 0.11% Native American, 0.11% Asian, 0.11% from other races, and 0.68% from two or more races. Hispanic or Latino of any race were 0.57% of the population.

There were 355 households, out of which 31.8% had children under the age of 18 living with them, 55.2% were married couples living together, 8.5% had a female householder with no husband present, and 33.0% were non-families. 22.8% of all households were made up of individuals, and 7.9% had someone living alone who was 65 years of age or older. The average household size was 2.48 and the average family size was 2.95.

In the town, the population was spread out, with 25.6% under the age of 18, 5.4% from 18 to 24, 29.1% from 25 to 44, 28.3% from 45 to 64, and 11.5% who were 65 years of age or older. The median age was 40 years. For every 100 females, there were 100.9 males. For every 100 females age 18 and over, there were 101.2 males.

The median income for a household in the town was $32,250, and the median income for a family was $39,375. Males had a median income of $27,500 versus $22,212 for females. The per capita income for the town was $15,200. About 15.6% of families and 17.5% of the population were below the poverty line, including 18.9% of those under age 18 and 12.2% of those age 65 or over.
