= Charleston, Maine =

Town in Maine, United States

- Town
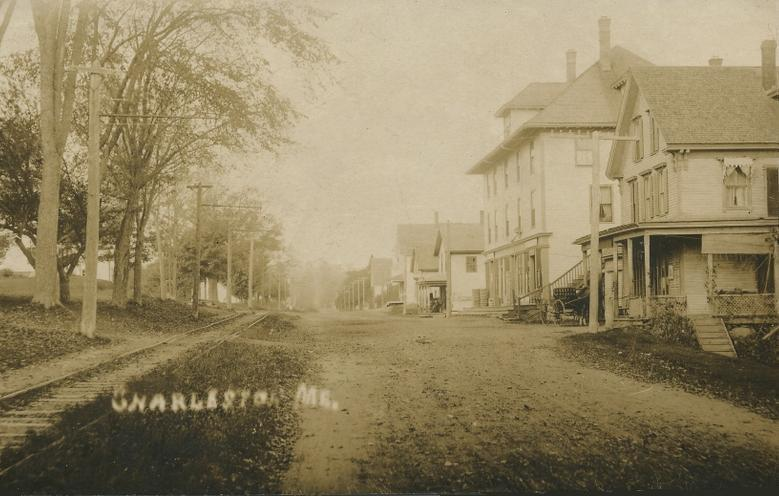
- Looking North, Charleston, ME; from a 1907 postcard

- Seal

- Location within Maine Location within the United States
- Coordinates: 45°05′30″N 69°01′02″W
- Country: United States
- State: Maine
- County: Penobscot
- Incorporated: 1811

Area
  - Total: 40.56 sq mi (105.05 km^{2})
  - Land: 40.55 sq mi (105.02 km^{2})
  - Water: 0.012 sq mi (0.03 km^{2})
- Elevation: 305 ft (93 m)

Population (2020)
  - Total: 1,558
  - Density: 38/sq mi (14.8/km^{2})
- Time zone: UTC-5 (Eastern (EST))
  - Summer (DST): UTC-4 (EDT)
- ZIP code: 04422
- Area code: 207
- FIPS code: 23-12105
- GNIS feature ID: 582404
- Website: www.charlestonmaine.com

Charleston is a town in Penobscot County, Maine, United States. It is part of the Bangor Metropolitan Statistical Area. The population was 1,558 at the 2020 census. Charleston includes the village of West Charleston and is home to the Higgins Classical Institute campus. Once a Christian school, it is now home to Faith Bible College International.

== History ==
Charleston was first settled as early as 1795 by Charles Vaughan. The land was granted on July 14, 1802, by the Massachusetts General Court to John Lowell. Known as T2 R5 NWP, or Township 2, Range 4, North of the Waldo Patent, it was incorporated on February 16, 1811, as New Charlestown, to distinguish it from Charlestown, Massachusetts, when that state included the province of Maine. But in 1820, Maine achieved statehood, so any confusion between the two ceased. Consequently, in 1827 the name was shortened to Charleston.

Sawmills were established to operate by water power at the streams. But Charleston was primarily an agricultural town. Its large farms were noted for raising horses and cattle. In 1837, the Higgins Classical Institute was founded. In 1975, the campus was acquired by Faith Bible College International. By 1870, the community had a population of 1,191. Between 1901 and 1930, the Bangor Railway & Electric Company operated trolleys on an electric railway between Bangor and Charleston.

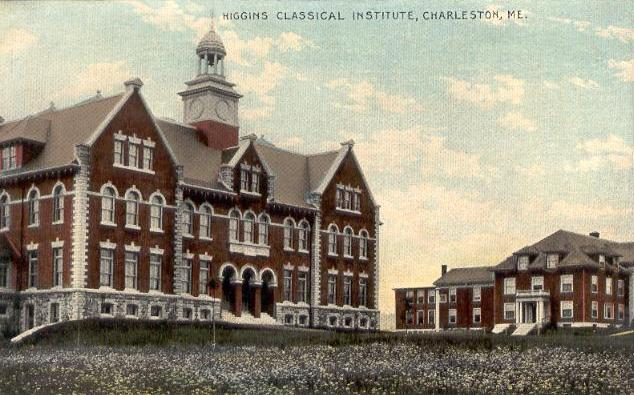
Higgins Classical Institute in 1905

In late 1950, construction began on the Charleston Air Force Station, part of the Aerospace Defense Command. Known as Bull Hill for its location in the town, the station was completed in early 1951, and fully staffed and operational in 1952. After the base closed, it was transformed into the Charleston Correctional Facility, which opened in 1980.

== Geography ==
According to the United States Census Bureau, the town has a total area of 40.56 square miles (105.05 km^{2}), of which 40.55 square miles (105.02 km^{2}) is land and 10.01 square miles (25.93 km^{2}) is the Weymouths land. Charleston is drained by Rollins Brook and South Gate Brook.

The town is located near the intersection of Charleston Road and South Stagecoach Road-Atkinson Road, between Route 15 (Bangor Road) and Route 221, and halfway between Schoodic Lake and Sebasticook Lake.

== Demographics ==
Historical population
Census	Pop.	Note	%±
1830	859		—
1840	1,269		47.7%
1850	1,283		1.1%
1860	1,430		11.5%
1870	1,191		−16.7%
1880	1,110		−6.8%
1890	971		−12.5%
1900	842		−13.3%
1910	864		2.6%
1920	720		−16.7%
1930	716		−0.6%
1940	768		7.3%
1950	771		0.4%
1960	750		−2.7%
1970	909		21.2%
1980	1,037		14.1%
1990	1,187		14.5%
2000	1,397		17.7%
2010	1,409		0.9%
2020	1,558		10.6%
U.S. Decennial Census

=== 2010 census ===
As of the census of 2010, there were 1,409 people, 481 households, and 347 families living in the town. The population density was 34.7 inhabitants per square mile (13.4/km^{2}). There were 546 housing units at an average density of 13.5 per square mile (5.2/km^{2}). The racial makeup of the town was 97.6% White, 0.6% African American, 0.7% Native American, 0.2% Asian, and 0.9% from two or more races. Hispanic or Latino of any race were 0.8% of the population.

There were 481 households, of which 33.1% had children under the age of 18 living with them, 60.5% were married couples living together, 6.9% had a female householder with no husband present, 4.8% had a male householder with no wife present, and 27.9% were non-families. 20.8% of all households were made up of individuals, and 7.5% had someone living alone who was 65 years of age or older. The average household size was 2.54 and the average family size was 2.95.

The median age in the town was 38.7 years. 24.5% of residents were under the age of 18; 8.5% were between the ages of 18 and 24; 26.7% were from 25 to 44; 29.9% were from 45 to 64; and 10.4% were 65 years of age or older. The gender makeup of the town was 56.2% male and 43.8% female.

=== 2000 census ===
As of the census of 2000, there were 1,397 people, 431 households, and 334 families living in the town. The population density was 34.7 inhabitants per square mile (13.4/km^{2}). There were 470 housing units at an average density of 11.7 per square mile (4.5/km^{2}). The racial makeup of the town was 98.28% White, 0.72% African American, 0.29% Native American, 0.21% Asian, and 0.50% from two or more races. Hispanic or Latino of any race were 0.21% of the population.

There were 431 households, out of which 34.6% had children under the age of 18 living with them, 66.6% were married couples living together, 5.8% had a female householder with no husband present, and 22.3% were non-families. 18.3% of all households were made up of individuals, and 5.8% had someone living alone who was 65 years of age or older. The average household size was 2.65 and the average family size was 2.92.

In the town, the population was spread out, with 24.1% under the age of 18, 10.1% from 18 to 24, 34.3% from 25 to 44, 24.2% from 45 to 64, and 7.4% who were 65 years of age or older. The median age was 36 years. For every 100 females, there were 109.8 males. For every 100 females age 18 and over, there were 115.7 males.

The median income for a household in the town was $36,053, and the median income for a family was $39,625. Males had a median income of $31,250 versus $20,735 for females. The per capita income for the town was $14,832. About 6.7% of families and 10.5% of the population were below the poverty line, including 14.8% of those under age 18 and 4.0% of those age 65 or over.
