= Brooks, Maine =

Town in Maine, United States

- Town
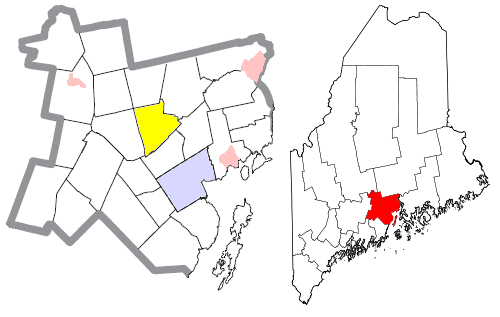
- Location of Brooks (in yellow) in Waldo County and the state of Maine
- Coordinates: 44°31′05″N 69°07′17″W
- Country: United States
- State: Maine
- County: Waldo

Area
  - Total: 25.37 sq mi (65.71 km^{2})
  - Land: 24.67 sq mi (63.90 km^{2})
  - Water: 0.70 sq mi (1.81 km^{2})
- Elevation: 472 ft (144 m)

Population (2020)
  - Total: 1,010
  - Density: 41/sq mi (15.8/km^{2})
- Time zone: UTC-5 (Eastern (EST))
  - Summer (DST): UTC-4 (EDT)
- ZIP code: 04921
- Area code: 207
- FIPS code: 23-07870
- GNIS feature ID: 582371
- Website: www.brooksme.org

Brooks is a town in Waldo County, Maine, United States. The population was 1,010 at the 2020 census.

The town was incorporated on December 10, 1816, and was named after John Brooks, the Federalist candidate for Governor of Massachusetts in 1815–1816, when the town incorporated. The town of Dexter, which incorporated the same year, was named after the opposing candidate Samuel Dexter. It was during Gov. Brooks' administration that Maine ceased to be a territory of Massachusetts and became a state.

== Geography ==
According to the United States Census Bureau, the town has a total area of 25.37 square miles (65.71 km^{2}), of which 24.67 square miles (63.90 km^{2}) is land and 0.70 square miles (1.81 km^{2}) is water. The town is drained by Marsh Stream. Principal bodies of water include Lake Passagassawakeag (a.k.a. Randall Pond) (117 acres), Ellis Pond (100 acres), Halfmoon Pond (37 acres) and Sanborn Pond (90 acres). The town is crossed by state routes SR 7, SR 203 and SR 139. It is bordered on the north by Jackson, on the northeast by Monroe, on the east by Swanville, on the south by Waldo, and on the west by Knox.

== Demographics ==
Historical population
Census	Pop.	Note	%±
1820	318		—
1830	601		89.0%
1840	910		51.4%
1850	1,021		12.2%
1860	988		−3.2%
1870	868		−12.1%
1880	877		1.0%
1890	730		−16.8%
1900	669		−8.4%
1910	704		5.2%
1920	691		−1.8%
1930	729		5.5%
1940	744		2.1%
1950	747		0.4%
1960	758		1.5%
1970	751		−0.9%
1980	804		7.1%
1990	900		11.9%
2000	1,022		13.6%
2010	1,078		5.5%
2020	1,010		−6.3%
U.S. Decennial Census

=== 2010 census ===
As of the census of 2010, there were 1,078 people, 446 households, and 285 families living in the town. The population density was 43.7 inhabitants per square mile (16.9/km^{2}). There were 562 housing units at an average density of 22.8 per square mile (8.8/km^{2}). The racial makeup of the town was 96.7% White, 0.4% African American, 0.8% Native American, 0.4% Asian, 0.1% from other races, and 1.7% from two or more races. Hispanic or Latino of any race were 0.6% of the population.

There were 446 households, of which 30.9% had children under the age of 18 living with them, 48.0% were married couples living together, 11.0% had a female householder with no husband present, 4.9% had a male householder with no wife present, and 36.1% were non-families. 28.9% of all households were made up of individuals, and 12.8% had someone living alone who was 65 years of age or older. The average household size was 2.42 and the average family size was 2.97.

The median age in the town was 40.2 years. 23.6% of residents were under the age of 18; 7.2% were between the ages of 18 and 24; 25.7% were from 25 to 44; 27.7% were from 45 to 64; and 15.8% were 65 years of age or older. The gender makeup of the town was 51.4% male and 48.6% female.

=== 2000 census ===
As of the census of 2000, there were 1,022 people, 410 households, and 275 families living in the town. The population density was 41.8 inhabitants per square mile (16.1/km^{2}). There were 522 housing units at an average density of 21.4 per square mile (8.3/km^{2}). The racial makeup of the town was 98.83% White, 0.10% African American, 0.20% Native American, 0.10% Asian, 0.10% from other races, and 0.68% from two or more races. Hispanic or Latino of any race were 0.88% of the population.

There were 410 households, out of which 31.2% had children under the age of 18 living with them, 55.9% were married couples living together, 6.6% had a female householder with no husband present, and 32.7% were non-families. 27.6% of all households were made up of individuals, and 11.2% had someone living alone who was 65 years of age or older. The average household size was 2.47 and the average family size was 2.98.

In the town, the population was spread out, with 26.3% under the age of 18, 6.8% from 18 to 24, 28.4% from 25 to 44, 24.6% from 45 to 64, and 14.0% who were 65 years of age or older. The median age was 38 years. For every 100 females, there were 97.3 males. For every 100 females age 18 and over, there were 90.2 males.

The median income for a household in the town was $30,104, and the median income for a family was $38,393. Males had a median income of $25,833 versus $18,977 for females. The per capita income for the town was $14,446. About 14.2% of families and 19.5% of the population were below the poverty line, including 24.9% of those under age 18 and 27.8% of those age 65 or over.
