= Canaan, Maine =

Town in Maine, United States

- Town
- Seal

- Location within Maine Location within the United States
- Coordinates: 44°45′26″N 69°31′15″W
- Country: United States
- State: Maine
- County: Somerset

Area
  - Total: 42.13 sq mi (109.12 km^{2})
  - Land: 41.16 sq mi (106.60 km^{2})
  - Water: 0.97 sq mi (2.51 km^{2})
- Elevation: 240 ft (73 m)

Population (2020)
  - Total: 2,193
  - Density: 53/sq mi (20.6/km^{2})
- Time zone: UTC-5 (Eastern (EST))
  - Summer (DST): UTC-4 (EDT)
- ZIP code: 04924
- Area code: 207
- FIPS code: 23-09935
- GNIS feature ID: 582385
- Website: www.townofcanaan.com

Canaan is a town in Somerset County, Maine, United States. The population was 2,193 at the 2020 census.

== Geography ==
According to the United States Census Bureau, the town has a total area of 42.13 square miles (109.12 km^{2}), of which 41.16 square miles (106.60 km^{2}) is land and 0.97 square miles (2.51 km^{2}) is water.

== Demographics ==
Historical population
Census	Pop.	Note	%±
1790	132		—
1800	720		445.5%
1810	1,275		77.1%
1820	1,470		15.3%
1830	1,076		−26.8%
1840	1,379		28.2%
1850	1,696		23.0%
1860	1,715		1.1%
1870	1,472		−14.2%
1880	1,281		−13.0%
1890	1,130		−11.8%
1900	977		−13.5%
1910	874		−10.5%
1920	822		−5.9%
1930	714		−13.1%
1940	717		0.4%
1950	785		9.5%
1960	800		1.9%
1970	904		13.0%
1980	1,189		31.5%
1990	1,636		37.6%
2000	2,017		23.3%
2010	2,275		12.8%
2020	2,193		−3.6%
U.S. Decennial Census

=== 2010 census ===
As of the census of 2010, there were 2,275 people, 901 households, and 637 families living in the town. The population density was 55.3 inhabitants per square mile (21.4/km^{2}). There were 1,105 housing units at an average density of 26.8 per square mile (10.3/km^{2}). The racial makeup of the town was 97.1% White, 0.1% African American, 0.8% Native American, 0.1% Asian, 0.3% Pacific Islander, 0.1% from other races, and 1.5% from two or more races. Hispanic or Latino of any race were 0.6% of the population.

There were 901 households, of which 34.6% had children under the age of 18 living with them, 52.3% were married couples living together, 11.9% had a female householder with no husband present, 6.5% had a male householder with no wife present, and 29.3% were non-families. 21.8% of all households were made up of individuals, and 5.8% had someone living alone who was 65 years of age or older. The average household size was 2.52 and the average family size was 2.87.

The median age in the town was 38.8 years. 25% of residents were under the age of 18; 7.1% were between the ages of 18 and 24; 26.3% were from 25 to 44; 30.5% were from 45 to 64; and 11.1% were 65 years of age or older. The gender makeup of the town was 50.1% male and 49.9% female.

=== 2000 census ===
As of the census of 2000, there were 2,017 people, 777 households, and 570 families living in the town. The population density was 49.1 inhabitants per square mile (19.0/km^{2}). There were 979 housing units at an average density of 23.8 per square mile (9.2/km^{2}). The racial makeup of the town was 97.87% White, 0.05% African American, 0.55% Native American, 0.15% Asian, 0.05% from other races, and 1.34% from two or more races. Hispanic or Latino of any race were 0.25% of the population.

There were 777 households, out of which 36.4% had children under the age of 18 living with them, 56.1% were married couples living together, 9.9% had a female householder with no husband present, and 26.6% were non-families. 19.4% of all households were made up of individuals, and 4.5% had someone living alone who was 65 years of age or older. The average household size was 2.60 and the average family size was 2.92.

In the town, the population was spread out, with 26.7% under the age of 18, 7.2% from 18 to 24, 31.1% from 25 to 44, 26.5% from 45 to 64, and 8.5% who were 65 years of age or older. The median age was 36 years. For every 100 females, there were 97.9 males. For every 100 females age 18 and over, there were 97.6 males.

The median income for a household in the town was $29,397, and the median income for a family was $31,818. Males had a median income of $27,000 versus $19,018 for females. The per capita income for the town was $13,870. About 16.4% of families and 17.9% of the population were below the poverty line, including 21.7% of those under age 18 and 16.7% of those age 65 or over.
