= Maine School Administrative District 49 =

School district in Maine, United States

Address
- 8 School St. Fairfield, Maine, 04937; United States

District information
- Motto: Communities Committed to Learning
- Superintendent: Roberta Hersom
- Deputy superintendent(s): Sean Boynton

Other information
- Website: www.msad49.org

Maine School Administrative District 49 (MSAD 49) is an operating school district in the U.S. state of Maine, covering the towns of Albion, Benton, Clinton and Fairfield. The district contains Lawrence High School, Lawrence Junior High School, Lawrence Elementary School and Lawrence Primary School.
