= Moscow, Maine =

Town in Maine, United States

- Town
- Seal
- Motto: "Best Little Town By a Dam Site"
- Location within Maine Location within the United States
- Coordinates: 45°07′36″N 69°52′20″W
- Country: United States
- State: Maine
- County: Somerset

Area
  - Total: 47.96 sq mi (124.22 km^{2})
  - Land: 45.92 sq mi (118.93 km^{2})
  - Water: 2.04 sq mi (5.28 km^{2})
- Elevation: 883 ft (269 m)

Population (2020)
  - Total: 475
  - Density: 10/sq mi (4/km^{2})
- Time zone: UTC-5 (Eastern (EST))
  - Summer (DST): UTC-4 (EDT)
- ZIP code: 04920
- Area code: 207
- FIPS code: 23-47455
- GNIS feature ID: 582609
- Website: moscowmaine.org

Moscow is a town in Somerset County, Maine, United States. The population was 475 at the 2020 census.

== History ==
Moscow Air Force Station, a radar installation comprising numerous steel antenna towers in three linear arrays on 1,494 acres about five miles northeast of the town center, was erected in the late 1980s and decommissioned in 2002. The site was put up for online auction in September 2011 through the U.S. General Services Administration. In July 2010 a wind farm was proposed as a possible use for the land, and the town began setting zoning regulations for wind turbine placement in December 2010. By October 2011, the radar antenna arrays had been dismantled and removed from the deactivated station, but microwave towers and various buildings remained. As of November 2011, the land was still up for auction with two bidders active. Because the site has been federally owned and tax-exempt, the town has been denied property tax revenue for decades.

== Geography ==
According to the United States Census Bureau, the town has a total area of 47.96 square miles (124.22 km^{2}), of which 45.92 square miles (118.93 km^{2}) is land and 2.04 square miles (5.28 km^{2}) is water.

== Demographics ==
Historical population
Census	Pop.	Note	%±
1820	286		—
1830	405		41.6%
1840	562		38.8%
1850	577		2.7%
1860	574		−0.5%
1870	528		−8.0%
1880	522		−1.1%
1890	422		−19.2%
1900	378		−10.4%
1910	518		37.0%
1920	365		−29.5%
1930	1,455		298.6%
1940	451		−69.0%
1950	482		6.9%
1960	559		16.0%
1970	586		4.8%
1980	570		−2.7%
1990	608		6.7%
2000	577		−5.1%
2010	512		−11.3%
2020	475		−7.2%
U.S. Decennial Census

=== 2010 census ===
As of the census of 2010, there were 512 people, 228 households, and 147 families living in the town. The population density was 11.1 inhabitants per square mile (4.3/km^{2}). There were 362 housing units at an average density of 7.9 per square mile (3.1/km^{2}). The racial makeup of the town was 97.9% White, 0.6% Native American, 0.4% Asian, and 1.2% from two or more races.

There were 228 households, of which 22.8% had children under the age of 18 living with them, 50.4% were married couples living together, 7.9% had a female householder with no husband present, 6.1% had a male householder with no wife present, and 35.5% were non-families. 26.8% of all households were made up of individuals, and 8.3% had someone living alone who was 65 years of age or older. The average household size was 2.25 and the average family size was 2.71.

The median age in the town was 46.9 years. 16.6% of residents were under the age of 18; 7.5% were between the ages of 18 and 24; 21.7% were from 25 to 44; 38.2% were from 45 to 64; and 16% were 65 years of age or older. The gender makeup of the town was 53.7% male and 46.3% female.

=== 2000 census ===
As of the census of 2000, there were 577 people, 222 households, and 156 families living in the town. The population density was 12.6 people per square mile (4.9/km^{2}). There were 353 housing units at an average density of 7.7 per square mile (3.0/km^{2}). The racial makeup of the town was 98.09% White, 0.69% Native American, and 1.21% from two or more races. Hispanic or Latino people of any race were 0.17% of the population.

There were 222 households, out of which 37.4% had children under the age of 18 living with them, 53.2% were married couples living together, 11.3% had a female householder with no husband present, and 29.3% were non-families. 23.4% of all households were made up of individuals, and 9.9% had someone living alone who was 65 years of age or older. The average household size was 2.60 and the average family size was 3.08.

In the town, the population was spread out, with 28.6% under the age of 18, 7.3% from 18 to 24, 31.4% from 25 to 44, 22.5% from 45 to 64, and 10.2% who were 65 years of age or older. The median age was 35 years. For every 100 females, there were 114.5 males. For every 100 females age 18 and over, there were 116.8 males.

The median income for a household in the town was $26,467, and the median income for a family was $32,500. Males had a median income of $28,750 versus $13,393 for females. The per capita income for the town was $13,099. About 13.9% of families and 12.4% of the population were below the poverty line, including 14.8% of those under age 18 and 32.1% of those age 65 or over.
