= Moose River, Maine =

Town in Maine, United States

- Town
- Location within Maine Location within the United States
- Coordinates: 45°43′05″N 70°12′53″W
- Country: United States
- State: Maine
- County: Somerset

Area
  - Total: 40.55 sq mi (105.02 km^{2})
  - Land: 40.07 sq mi (103.78 km^{2})
  - Water: 0.48 sq mi (1.24 km^{2})
- Elevation: 1,470 ft (450 m)

Population (2020)
  - Total: 188
  - Density: 4.7/sq mi (1.8/km^{2})
- Time zone: UTC-5 (Eastern (EST))
  - Summer (DST): UTC-4 (EDT)
- ZIP code: 04945
- Area code: 207
- FIPS code: 23-47140
- GNIS feature ID: 582606

Moose River is a town in Somerset County, Maine, United States. The population was 188 at the 2020 census. It was first settled by Capt. Samuel Holden who in 1820 opened an inn as a stop for cattle drivers en route from Boston to Quebec.

== Geography ==
According to the United States Census Bureau, the town has a total area of 40.55 square miles (105.02 km^{2}), of which 40.07 square miles (103.78 km^{2}) is land and 0.48 square miles (1.24 km^{2}) is water.

== Demographics ==
Historical population
Census	Pop.	Note	%±
1850	83		—
1860	135		62.7%
1870	104		−23.0%
1880	102		−1.9%
1890	170		66.7%
1900	239		40.6%
1910	251		5.0%
1920	511		103.6%
1930	277		−45.8%
1940	216		−22.0%
1950	203		−6.0%
1960	205		1.0%
1970	255		24.4%
1980	252		−1.2%
1990	233		−7.5%
2000	219		−6.0%
2010	218		−0.5%
2020	188		−13.8%
U.S. Decennial Census

=== 2010 census ===
As of the census of 2010, there were 218 people, 95 households, and 62 families living in the town. The population density was 5.4 inhabitants per square mile (2.1/km^{2}). There were 157 housing units at an average density of 3.9 per square mile (1.5/km^{2}). The racial makeup of the town was 96.8% White, 1.4% Native American, 0.5% Asian, and 1.4% from two or more races. Hispanic or Latino of any race were 3.7% of the population.

There were 95 households, of which 27.4% had children under the age of 18 living with them, 58.9% were married couples living together, 5.3% had a female householder with no husband present, 1.1% had a male householder with no wife present, and 34.7% were non-families. 25.3% of all households were made up of individuals, and 10.5% had someone living alone who was 65 years of age or older. The average household size was 2.29 and the average family size was 2.81.

The median age in the town was 45.6 years. 19.7% of residents were under the age of 18; 5% were between the ages of 18 and 24; 23.8% were from 25 to 44; 37.6% were from 45 to 64; and 13.8% were 65 years of age or older. The gender makeup of the town was 49.5% male and 50.5% female.

=== 2000 census ===
As of the census of 2000, there were 219 people, 81 households, and 54 families living in the town. The population density was 5.4 people per square mile (2.1/km^{2}). There were 122 housing units at an average density of 3.0 per square mile (1.2/km^{2}). The racial makeup of the town was 96.35% White, 0.46% African American, and 3.20% from two or more races. Hispanic or Latino of any race were 3.20% of the population.

There were 81 households, out of which 34.6% had children under the age of 18 living with them, 59.3% were married couples living together, 3.7% had a female householder with no husband present, and 33.3% were non-families. 23.5% of all households were made up of individuals, and 6.2% had someone living alone who was 65 years of age or older. The average household size was 2.46 and the average family size was 3.02.

In the town, the population was spread out, with 24.7% under the age of 18, 4.6% from 18 to 24, 26.5% from 25 to 44, 26.0% from 45 to 64, and 18.3% who were 65 years of age or older. The median age was 42 years. For every 100 females, there were 110.6 males. For every 100 females age 18 and over, there were 108.9 males.

The median income for a household in the town was $31,042, and the median income for a family was $43,214. Males had a median income of $27,159 versus $20,833 for females. The per capita income for the town was $13,644. About 7.1% of families and 7.3% of the population were below the poverty line, including none of those under the age of eighteen and 27.6% of those 65 or over.
