= Detroit, Maine =

Town in Maine, United States

- Town
- Location within Maine Location within the United States
- Coordinates: 44°45′13″N 69°18′27″W
- Country: United States
- State: Maine
- County: Somerset

Area
  - Total: 20.42 sq mi (52.89 km^{2})
  - Land: 20.25 sq mi (52.45 km^{2})
  - Water: 0.17 sq mi (0.44 km^{2})
- Elevation: 190 ft (58 m)

Population (2020)
  - Total: 885
  - Density: 44/sq mi (16.9/km^{2})
- Time zone: UTC-5 (Eastern (EST))
  - Summer (DST): UTC-4 (EDT)
- ZIP code: 04929
- Area code: 207
- FIPS code: 23-17460
- GNIS feature ID: 582441
- Website: townofdetroitme.com

Detroit (/ˈdiːtrɔɪt/, DEE-troyt) is a town in Somerset County, Maine, United States. The population was 885 at the 2020 census.

== Geography ==
According to the United States Census Bureau, the town has a total area of 20.42 square miles (52.89 km^{2}), of which 20.25 square miles (52.45 km^{2}) is land and 0.17 square miles (0.44 km^{2}) is water.

== Demographics ==
Historical population
Census	Pop.	Note	%±
1830	172		—
1840	372		116.3%
1850	517		39.0%
1860	659		27.5%
1870	690		4.7%
1880	661		−4.2%
1890	590		−10.7%
1900	527		−10.7%
1910	461		−12.5%
1920	412		−10.6%
1930	415		0.7%
1940	466		12.3%
1950	492		5.6%
1960	564		14.6%
1970	663		17.6%
1980	744		12.2%
1990	751		0.9%
2000	816		8.7%
2010	852		4.4%
2020	885		3.9%
U.S. Decennial Census

=== 2010 census ===
As of the census of 2010, there were 852 people, 337 households, and 237 families living in the town. The population density was 42.1 inhabitants per square mile (16.3/km^{2}). There were 382 housing units at an average density of 18.9 per square mile (7.3/km^{2}). The racial makeup of the town was 98.6% White, 0.1% African American, 0.7% Native American, and 0.6% from two or more races. Hispanic or Latino of any race were 1.2% of the population.

There were 337 households, of which 34.7% had children under the age of 18 living with them, 52.2% were married couples living together, 12.8% had a female householder with no husband present, 5.3% had a male householder with no wife present, and 29.7% were non-families. 23.1% of all households were made up of individuals, and 8.9% had someone living alone who was 65 years of age or older. The average household size was 2.53 and the average family size was 2.89.

The median age in the town was 41.5 years. 23.9% of residents were under the age of 18; 6.4% were between the ages of 18 and 24; 25.5% were from 25 to 44; 31.4% were from 45 to 64; and 12.8% were 65 years of age or older. The gender makeup of the town was 50.5% male and 49.5% female.

=== 2000 census ===
As of the census of 2000, there were 816 people, 328 households, and 226 families living in the town. The population density was 40.3 inhabitants per square mile (15.6/km^{2}). There were 362 housing units at an average density of 17.9 per square mile (6.9/km^{2}). The racial makeup of the town was 98.77% White, 0.25% African American, 0.12% Native American, and 0.86% from two or more races. Hispanic or Latino of any race were 0.74% of the population.

There were 328 households, out of which 31.7% had children under the age of 18 living with them, 57.6% were married couples living together, 6.7% had a female householder with no husband present, and 30.8% were non-families. 23.5% of all households were made up of individuals, and 8.5% had someone living alone who was 65 years of age or older. The average household size was 2.49 and the average family size was 2.91.

In the town, the population was spread out, with 24.8% under the age of 18, 7.1% from 18 to 24, 31.0% from 25 to 44, 26.2% from 45 to 64, and 10.9% who were 65 years of age or older. The median age was 37 years. For every 100 females, there were 100.5 males. For every 100 females age 18 and over, there were 101.3 males.

The median income for a household in the town was $29,938, and the median income for a family was $34,167. Males had a median income of $27,303 versus $20,119 for females. The per capita income for the town was $13,937. About 9.4% of families and 14.3% of the population were below the poverty line, including 16.0% of those under age 18 and 9.9% of those age 65 or over.
