= Thorndike, Maine =

Town in Maine, United States

- Town
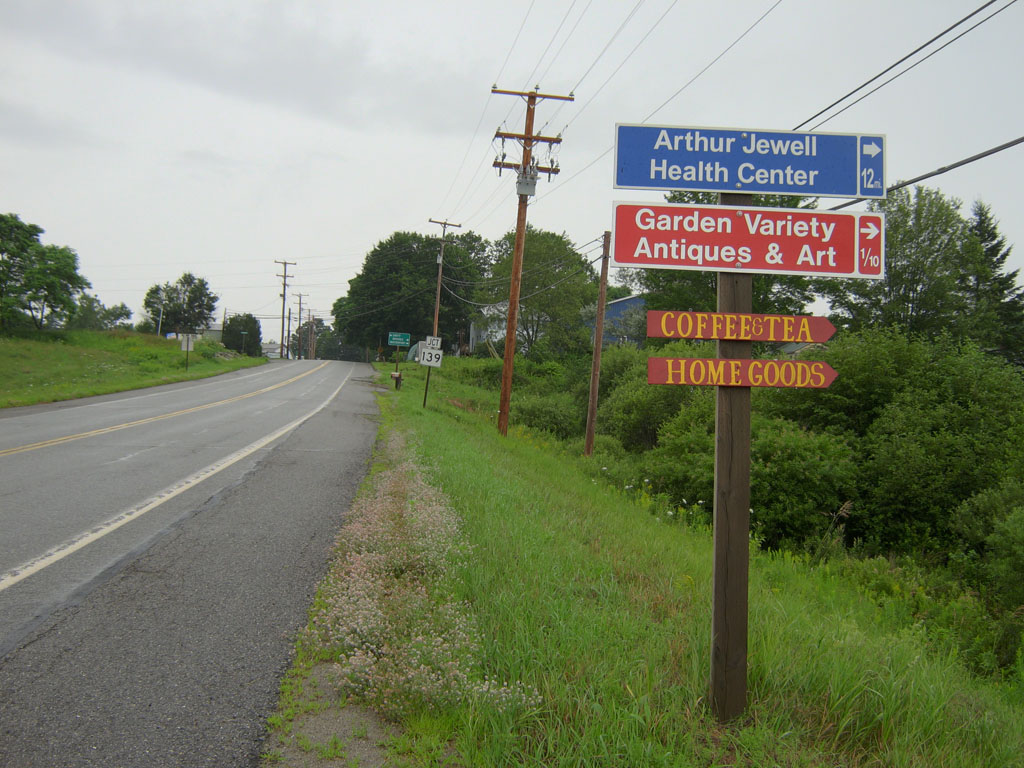
- Thorndike, ME as seen looking north on ME 220 towards ME 139.

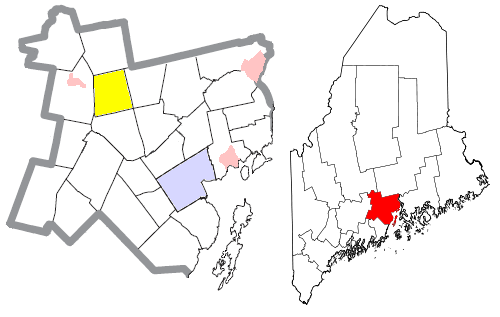
- Location of Thorndike (in yellow) in Waldo County and the state of Maine
- Coordinates: 44°36′38″N 69°14′26″W
- Country: United States
- State: Maine
- County: Waldo

Area
  - Total: 25.26 sq mi (65.42 km^{2})
  - Land: 25.26 sq mi (65.42 km^{2})
  - Water: 0 sq mi (0 km^{2})
- Elevation: 528 ft (161 m)

Population (2020)
  - Total: 774
  - Density: 31/sq mi (11.8/km^{2})
- Time zone: UTC-5 (Eastern (EST))
  - Summer (DST): UTC-4 (EDT)
- ZIP code: 04986
- Area code: 207
- FIPS code: 23-76610
- GNIS feature ID: 582764
- Website: thorndikeme.com

Thorndike is a town in Waldo County, Maine, United States. The town was named after Israel Thorndike, a landowner. The population was 774 at the 2020 census.

== Geography ==
According to the United States Census Bureau, the town has a total area of 25.26 square miles (65.42 km^{2}), all land. The town is drained by Halfmoon Stream. The town is crossed by state routes SR 220 and SR 139.

== Demographics ==
Historical population
| Census | Pop. | Note | %± |
|---|---|---|---|
| 1820 | 543 | | — |
| 1830 | 652 | | 20.1% |
| 1840 | 897 | | 37.6% |
| 1850 | 1,029 | | 14.7% |
| 1860 | 958 | | −6.9% |
| 1870 | 730 | | −23.8% |
| 1880 | 713 | | −2.3% |
| 1890 | 589 | | −17.4% |
| 1900 | 497 | | −15.6% |
| 1910 | 525 | | 5.6% |
| 1920 | 429 | | −18.3% |
| 1930 | 454 | | 5.8% |
| 1940 | 478 | | 5.3% |
| 1950 | 534 | | 11.7% |
| 1960 | 457 | | −14.4% |
| 1970 | 439 | | −3.9% |
| 1980 | 603 | | 37.4% |
| 1990 | 702 | | 16.4% |
| 2000 | 712 | | 1.4% |
| 2010 | 890 | | 25.0% |
| 2020 | 774 | | −13.0% |
U.S. Decennial Census

=== 2010 census ===
As of the census of 2010, there were 890 people, 330 households, and 232 families living in the town. The population density was 35.2 inhabitants per square mile (13.6/km^{2}). There were 396 housing units at an average density of 15.7 per square mile (6.1/km^{2}). The racial makeup of the town was 97.5% White, 0.2% African American, 0.1% Native American, 0.2% Asian, 0.3% from other races, and 1.6% from two or more races. Hispanic or Latino of any race were 0.8% of the population.

There were 330 households, of which 36.1% had children under the age of 18 living with them, 57.0% were married couples living together, 8.5% had a female householder with no husband present, 4.8% had a male householder with no wife present, and 29.7% were non-families. 20.6% of all households were made up of individuals, and 8.8% had someone living alone who was 65 years of age or older. The average household size was 2.70 and the average family size was 3.16.

The median age in the town was 38 years. 27.2% of residents were under the age of 18; 8.4% were between the ages of 18 and 24; 26% were from 25 to 44; 25.9% were from 45 to 64; and 12.6% were 65 years of age or older. The gender makeup of the town was 51.6% male and 48.4% female.

=== 2000 census ===
As of the census of 2000, there were 712 people, 279 households, and 201 families living in the town. The population density was 28.2 inhabitants per square mile (10.9/km^{2}). There were 337 housing units at an average density of 13.3 per square mile (5.1/km^{2}). The racial makeup of the town was 99.02% White, 0.14% African American, 0.28% Native American, 0.28% Asian, and 0.28% from two or more races. Hispanic or Latino of any race were 0.28% of the population.

There were 279 households, out of which 33.0% had children under the age of 18 living with them, 59.5% were married couples living together, 8.6% had a female householder with no husband present, and 27.6% were non-families. 19.7% of all households were made up of individuals, and 6.8% had someone living alone who was 65 years of age or older. The average household size was 2.54 and the average family size was 2.89.

In the town, the population was spread out, with 24.7% under the age of 18, 8.1% from 18 to 24, 29.2% from 25 to 44, 26.7% from 45 to 64, and 11.2% who were 65 years of age or older. The median age was 37 years. For every 100 females, there were 102.3 males. For every 100 females age 18 and over, there were 95.6 males.

The median income for a household in the town was $26,786, and the median income for a family was $29,479. Males had a median income of $24,375 versus $24,018 for females. The per capita income for the town was $13,090. About 14.9% of families and 17.4% of the population were below the poverty line, including 22.6% of those under age 18 and 26.3% of those age 65 or over.
