= Plantation (Maine) =

Type of minor civil division in Maine, United States

In the U.S. state of Maine, a plantation is a type of minor civil division falling between unincorporated area and a town. The term, as used in this sense in modern times, appears to be exclusive to Maine. Plantations are typically found in sparsely populated areas.

== History ==
No other state has an entity equivalent to a plantation. Massachusetts used the term "plantation" in colonial times for a community in a pre-town stage of development. Maine, then part of Massachusetts, and known then as The District of Maine, has preserved the term, though it has been out of wide use in Massachusetts since the 18th century. The term was also used in colonial Rhode Island, and a vestige remained in the official state name until 2020, Rhode Island and Providence Plantations.

Writing in 1949, author Richard Walden Hale in The Story of Bar Harbor described the formation of a plantation as follows:

First came the survey, without which no settlement was legal. Land so surveyed was divided into "townships", which in New England means areas planned for development into full-fledged towns. Then certain proprietors—who might be a religious congregation, a group of speculators, or a group of would-be settlers—bought the "township", "planted it" with settlers, and saw to it that land was reserved for a church and school. When enough settlers had been planted, limited self government was granted, and the township was raised in status to a "plantation". When the population of the "plantation" should have grown large enough, another step forward was taken, the area received full civil rights, the full town organization came into force, and in those days one representative in the legislature or "General Court" was automatically allotted to the new town. ... Such a system still holds good in Maine. ... To this day one can go thirty miles northeast of Bar Harbor and find, still unsettled, Township Number Seven, just back of Gouldsboro and Sullivan, and then go twenty miles southeast—in each case as the crow flies—and find Swan's Island Plantation, where to this day there is not enough population for the full complement of town officials.

Despite a further shrinking population, with a permanent population of 468 in 1950 and only 331 in 2012, Swan's Island was later incorporated as a town, possibly aided by regular state ferry service which began in 1960. Today, the town is a popular summer colony, with a seasonal summer population of over 1,000.

== See also ==
- List of municipalities in Maine
- Plantation (settlement or colony)
- Rhode Island § Name Origin
