= Politics of Maine =

American state politics

The U.S. state of Maine, like many other states, is active in both state politics and national politics.

In state politics, Maine tends to have more moderate politicians, with the state having had two independent governors. It is also one of the U.S.'s 17 alcoholic beverage control states, meaning that the state's government exercises control over the sale of alcoholic beverages like wine and beer. The state of Maine was also an early adopter of same-sex marriage, introducing it in 2012.

At the national level, Maine is generally a Democratic Party state, although its Senate seats are often held by Republicans. However, it used to be a Republican state entirely, before tilting towards the Democrats in the 1960s. The state of Maine is also noted for being one of the only two of the 50 states other than Nebraska that does not necessarily give all its electoral votes in the U.S. electoral college to the winner. Since 1969, two of the four votes go to the statewide winner, whereas the other two votes are based on the two electoral districts respectively. This resulted in Maine splitting its electoral vote for the first time in the 2016 presidential election and subsequently in the 2020 and 2024 presidential election.

== State and local politics ==
Gubernatorial election results
Year	Democratic	Republican
1954	54.5% 135,673	45.5% 113,298
1956	59.2% 180,254	40.8% 124,395
1958	52.0% 145,673	48.0% 134,572
1962	49.9% 146,121	50.1% 146,604
1966	53.1% 172,036	46.9% 151,802
1970	50.1% 163,138	49.9% 162,248
1974	36.8% 132,219	23.5% 84,176
1978	47.8% 176,493	34.4% 126,862
1982	61.9% 281,066	38.1% 172,949
1986	30.2% 128,744	39.9% 170,312
1990	44.1% 230,038	46.7% 243,766
1994	33.8% 172,951	23.1% 117,990
1998	12.0% 50,506	18.9% 79,716
2002	47.2% 238,179	41.5% 209,496
2006	38.1% 209,927	30.2% 166,425
2010	18.8% 109,387	37.6% 218,065
2014	43.4% 265,125	48.2% 294,533
2018	50.9% 320,962	43.2% 272,311
2022	55.7% 376,934	42.4% 287,304

In state general elections, Maine voters tend to accept independent and third-party candidates more frequently than most states. Maine has had two independent governors: James B. Longley (1975–1979) and Angus King (1995–2003), who currently serves in the US Senate. Maine state politicians, Democrats and Republicans alike, are noted for having more moderate views than many in the national wings of their respective parties.

Maine is an alcoholic beverage control state.

On May 6, 2009, Maine became the fifth state to legalize same-sex marriage; however, the law was repealed by voters on November 3, 2009. On November 6, 2012, Maine, along with Maryland and Washington, became the first state to legalize same-sex marriage at the ballot box.

Party registration as of October 2022
Party	Total voters	Percentage
Democratic	339,103	37.48%
Republican	272,003	30.06%
Unenrolled	257,565	28.47%
Green	35,061	3.88%
Libertarian	942	0.10%
Total	904,674	100.00%

== Federal politics ==
United States presidential election results for Maine
Year	Republican / Whig		Democratic		Third party(ies)	
Year	No.	%	No.	%	No.	%
1824	10,289	81.50%	0	0.00%	2,336	18.50%
1828	20,773	59.71%	13,927	40.03%	89	0.26%
1832	27,331	43.97%	33,978	54.67%	844	1.36%
1836	14,803	38.21%	22,825	58.92%	1,112	2.87%
1840	46,612	50.23%	46,190	49.77%	0	0.00%
1844	34,378	40.48%	45,719	53.83%	4,836	5.69%
1848	35,273	40.25%	40,195	45.87%	12,157	13.87%
1852	32,543	39.60%	41,609	50.63%	8,030	9.77%
1856	67,279	61.34%	39,140	35.68%	3,270	2.98%
1860	62,811	62.24%	29,693	29.42%	8,414	8.34%
1864	67,805	59.07%	46,992	40.93%	0	0.00%
1868	70,502	62.41%	42,460	37.59%	0	0.00%
1872	61,426	67.86%	29,097	32.14%	0	0.00%
1876	66,300	56.64%	49,917	42.65%	828	0.71%
1880	74,052	51.46%	65,211	45.32%	4,640	3.22%
1884	72,217	55.34%	52,153	39.97%	6,121	4.69%
1888	73,730	57.49%	50,472	39.35%	4,051	3.16%
1892	62,936	54.05%	48,049	41.26%	5,466	4.69%
1896	80,403	67.90%	34,587	29.21%	3,429	2.90%
1900	65,412	61.89%	36,822	34.84%	3,459	3.27%
1904	65,432	67.44%	27,642	28.49%	3,949	4.07%
1908	66,987	63.00%	35,403	33.29%	3,946	3.71%
1912	26,545	20.48%	51,113	39.43%	51,982	40.10%
1916	69,508	50.99%	64,033	46.97%	2,773	2.03%
1920	136,355	68.92%	58,961	29.80%	2,524	1.28%
1924	138,440	72.03%	41,964	21.83%	11,788	6.13%
1928	179,923	68.63%	81,179	30.96%	1,069	0.41%
1932	166,631	55.83%	128,907	43.19%	2,906	0.97%
1936	168,823	55.49%	126,333	41.52%	9,084	2.99%
1940	163,951	51.10%	156,478	48.77%	411	0.13%
1944	155,434	52.44%	140,631	47.45%	335	0.11%
1948	150,234	56.74%	111,916	42.27%	2,639	1.00%
1952	232,353	66.05%	118,806	33.77%	627	0.18%
1956	249,238	70.87%	102,468	29.13%	0	0.00%
1960	240,608	57.05%	181,159	42.95%	6	0.00%
1964	118,701	31.14%	262,264	68.80%	256	0.07%
1968	169,254	43.07%	217,312	55.30%	6,370	1.62%
1972	256,458	61.46%	160,584	38.48%	229	0.05%
1976	236,320	48.91%	232,279	48.07%	14,609	3.02%
1980	238,522	45.61%	220,974	42.25%	63,515	12.14%
1984	336,500	60.83%	214,515	38.78%	2,129	0.38%
1988	307,131	55.34%	243,569	43.88%	4,335	0.78%
1992	206,504	30.39%	263,420	38.77%	209,575	30.84%
1996	186,378	30.76%	312,788	51.62%	106,731	17.62%
2000	286,616	43.97%	319,951	49.09%	45,250	6.94%
2004	330,201	44.58%	396,842	53.57%	13,709	1.85%
2008	295,273	40.38%	421,923	57.71%	13,967	1.91%
2012	292,276	40.98%	401,306	56.27%	19,598	2.75%
2016	335,593	44.87%	357,735	47.83%	54,599	7.30%
2020	360,770	44.03%	435,072	53.09%	23,619	2.88%
2024	377,977	45.46%	435,652	52.40%	17,746	2.13%

In the 1930s, Maine was one of very few states which retained Republican sentiments. In the 1936 presidential election, Franklin D. Roosevelt received the electoral votes of every state other than Maine and Vermont; these were the only two states in the nation that never voted for Roosevelt in any of his presidential campaigns, though Maine was closely fought in 1940 and 1944. In the 1960s, Maine began to lean toward the Democrats, especially in presidential elections. In 1968, Hubert Humphrey became just the second Democrat in half a century to carry Maine, perhaps because of the presence of his running mate, Maine Senator Edmund Muskie, although the state voted Republican in every presidential election in the 1970s and 1980s.

Since 1969, two of Maine's four electoral votes have been awarded based on the winner of the statewide election; the other two go to the highest vote-getter in each of the state's two congressional districts. Every other state except Nebraska gives all its electoral votes to the candidate who wins the popular vote in the state at large, without regard to performance within districts. Maine split its electoral vote for the first time in 2016 and subsequently in 2020 and 2024 with Donald Trump's strong showing in the more rural central and northern Maine allowing him to capture one of the state's four votes in the Electoral College.

Ross Perot achieved a great deal of success in Maine in the presidential elections of 1992 and 1996. In 1992, as an independent candidate, Perot came in second to Democrat Bill Clinton, despite the long-time presence of the Bush family summer home in Kennebunkport. In 1996, as the nominee of the Reform Party, Perot did better in Maine than in any other state.

Maine has voted for Democratic Bill Clinton twice, Al Gore in 2000, John Kerry in 2004, and Barack Obama in 2008 and 2012. In 2016, Republican Donald Trump won one of Maine's electoral votes with Democratic opponent Hillary Clinton winning the other three. Although Democrats have mostly carried the state in presidential elections in recent years, the second congressional district has shifted rightwards and has become a reliable Republican stronghold at presidential level. Also, Republicans have largely maintained their control of the state's U.S. Senate seats, with Edmund Muskie, William Hathaway and George J. Mitchell being the only Maine Democrats serving in the U.S. Senate in the past fifty years.

In the 2010 midterm elections, Republicans made major gains in Maine. They captured the governor's office as well as majorities in both chambers of the state legislature for the first time since the early 1970s. However, in the 2012 elections Democrats managed to recapture both houses of Maine Legislature.

Maine's U.S. senators are Republican Susan Collins and Independent Angus King. The governor is Democrat Janet Mills. The state's two members of the United States House of Representatives are Democrats Chellie Pingree and Jared Golden.

In 2025, Maine also came under scrutiny from the Trump Administration due to its stance on transgender rights. In 2026, the death of Johan Sebastian Guerrero occurred by an ICE agent, causing protests.

Maine is the first state to have introduced ranked-choice voting in federal elections.

Party registration by Maine county (October 2022)
Democrat >= 30%
Democrat >= 40%
Republican >= 30%
Republican >= 40%
Unenrolled >= 30%

Treemap of the popular vote by county, 2016 presidential election

== See also ==
- As Maine goes, so goes the nation
- Libertarian Party of Maine
- Maine Democratic Party
- Maine Republican Party
- Maine Green Independent Party
- Political party strength in Maine
