= Cumberland County, Maine =

County in Maine, United States

- County
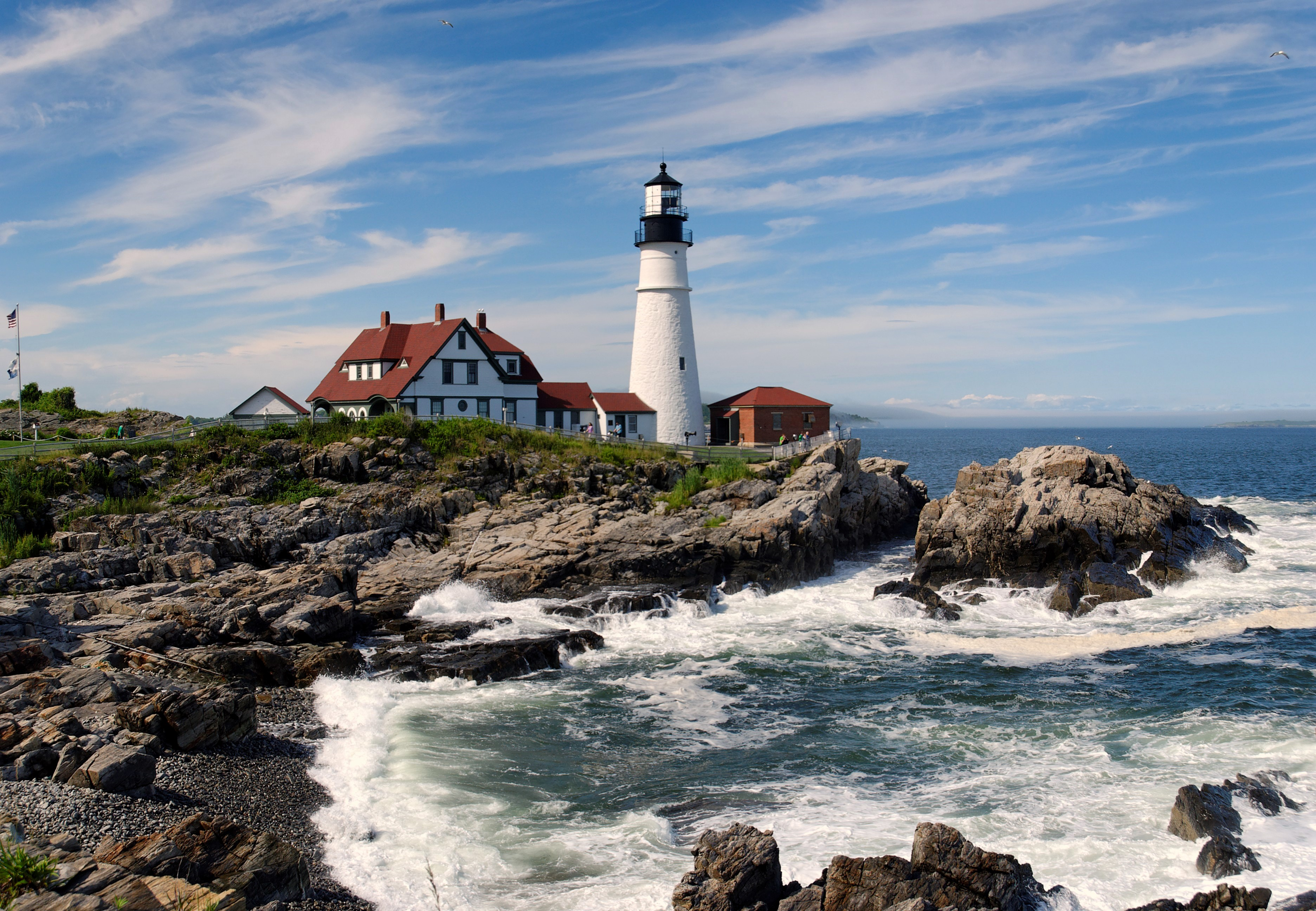
- The Portland Head Light in Cape Elizabeth

- Seal Logo

- Location within the U.S. state of Maine
- Coordinates: 43°47′04″N 70°19′41″W
- Country: United States
- State: Maine
- Founded: November 1, 1760
- Named for: Prince William, Duke of Cumberland
- Seat: Portland
- Largest city: Portland

Area
  - Total: 1,217 sq mi (3,150 km^{2})
  - Land: 835 sq mi (2,160 km^{2})
  - Water: 383 sq mi (990 km^{2}) 31%

Population (2020)
  - Total: 303,069
  - Estimate (2025): 317,222 ▲
  - Density: 363/sq mi (140/km^{2})
- Time zone: UTC−5 (Eastern)
  - Summer (DST): UTC−4 (EDT)
- Congressional district: 1st
- Website: cumberlandcountyme.gov

Cumberland County is a county in the U.S. state of Maine. As of the 2020 census, the population was 303,069, making it the most populous county in Maine. Its county seat is Portland. Cumberland County was founded in 1760 from a portion of York County, Province of Massachusetts Bay, and named for William, Duke of Cumberland, a son of King George II. Cumberland County has the deepest and second-largest body of water in the state, Sebago Lake, which supplies tap water to most of the county. The county is the state's economic and industrial center, having the resources of the Port of Portland, the Maine Mall, and having corporate headquarters of major companies such as onsemi, IDEXX Laboratories, Unum, and TD Bank. Cumberland County is part of the Portland-South Portland-Biddeford metropolitan area.

== Geography, topography and ecology ==
According to the U.S. Census Bureau, the county has a total area of 1,217 square miles (3,150 km^{2}), of which 835 square miles (2,160 km^{2}) is land and 382 square miles (990 km^{2}) (31%) is water.

Most of Casco Bay and most of its islands east of East Cundy Point belong to the county's territory, as does the northernmost part of Saco Bay. Sebago Lake flows into Casco Bay via the Presumpscot River, and Nonesuch River flows into Saco Bay. North and west of Sebago Lake, the terrain of the county begins to flow into the foothills of the Appalachian Mountain range.

About 62.9% of Cumberland County was forested as of 2024, according to the Forest Service of the U.S. Department of Agriculture.

=== Adjacent counties ===
- Androscoggin County – north
- Oxford County – northwest
- Sagadahoc County – northeast
- York County – southwest

=== Major highways ===
- I-95 / Maine Turnpike
- I-295
- U.S. Route 202
- U.S. Route 302
- U.S. 1
- Maine State Route 9
- Maine State Route 77
- Maine State Route 114
- Falmouth Spur

=== National protected area ===
- Rachel Carson National Wildlife Refuge (part)

== Demographics ==
Historical population
Census	Pop.	Note	%±
1790	25,530		—
1800	38,208		49.7%
1810	42,831		12.1%
1820	49,445		15.4%
1830	60,102		21.6%
1840	68,658		14.2%
1850	79,538		15.8%
1860	75,591		−5.0%
1870	82,021		8.5%
1880	86,359		5.3%
1890	90,949		5.3%
1900	100,689		10.7%
1910	112,014		11.2%
1920	124,376		11.0%
1930	134,645		8.3%
1940	146,000		8.4%
1950	169,201		15.9%
1960	182,751		8.0%
1970	192,528		5.3%
1980	215,789		12.1%
1990	243,135		12.7%
2000	265,612		9.2%
2010	281,674		6.0%
2020	303,069		7.6%
2025 (est.)	317,222	▲	4.7%
U.S. Decennial Census; 1790–1960 1900–1990; 1990–2000 2010–2019

=== 2020 census ===
As of the 2020 census, the county had a population of 303,069. Of the residents, 18.5% were under the age of 18 and 19.7% were 65 years of age or older; the median age was 42.4 years. For every 100 females there were 93.9 males, and for every 100 females age 18 and over there were 91.4 males. 62.4% of residents lived in urban areas and 37.6% lived in rural areas.

The racial makeup of the county was 87.2% White, 4.0% Black or African American, 0.3% American Indian and Alaska Native, 2.4% Asian, 0.0% Native Hawaiian and Pacific Islander, 1.0% from some other race, and 5.1% from two or more races. Hispanic or Latino residents of any race comprised 2.6% of the population.

There were 128,100 households in the county, of which 24.8% had children under the age of 18 living with them and 27.1% had a female householder with no spouse or partner present. About 30.2% of all households were made up of individuals and 12.8% had someone living alone who was 65 years of age or older.

There were 149,452 housing units, of which 14.3% were vacant. Among occupied housing units, 67.1% were owner-occupied and 32.9% were renter-occupied. The homeowner vacancy rate was 0.7% and the rental vacancy rate was 4.7%.

Cumberland County, Maine – Racial and ethnic composition Note: the US Census treats Hispanic/Latino as an ethnic category. This table excludes Latinos from the racial categories and assigns them to a separate category. Hispanics/Latinos may be of any race.
Race / Ethnicity (NH = Non-Hispanic)	Pop 2000	Pop 2010	Pop 2020	% 2000	% 2010	% 2020
White alone (NH)	252,915	258,468	262,137	95.21%	91.76%	86.49%
Black or African American alone (NH)	2,690	6,577	11,925	1.01%	2.33%	3.93%
Native American or Alaska Native alone (NH)	710	819	667	0.26%	0.29%	0.22%
Asian alone (NH)	3,671	5,705	7,167	1.38%	2.02%	2.36%
Pacific Islander alone (NH)	83	80	96	0.03%	0.02%	0.03%
Other race alone (NH)	280	329	1,169	0.10%	0.11%	0.38%
Mixed race or Multiracial (NH)	2,737	4,651	11,897	1.03%	1.65%	3.92%
Hispanic or Latino (any race)	2,526	5,045	8,011	0.95%	1.79%	2.64%
Total	265,612	281,674	303,069	100.00%	100.00%	100.00%

=== 2010 census ===
As of the 2010 United States census, there were 281,674 people, 117,339 households, and 70,778 families living in the county. The population density was 337.2 inhabitants per square mile (130.2/km^{2}). There were 138,657 housing units at an average density of 166.0 per square mile (64.1/km^{2}). The racial makeup of the county was 92.8% white, 2.4% black or African American, 2.0% Asian, 0.3% American Indian, 0.6% from other races, and 1.8% from two or more races. Those of Hispanic or Latino origin made up 1.8% of the population. In terms of ancestry, 22.7% were English, 21.1% were Irish, 9.0% were German, 8.4% were Italian, 6.0% were Scottish, 5.5% were French Canadian, and 4.4% were American.

Of the 117,339 households, 28.3% had children under the age of 18 living with them, 46.8% were married couples living together, 9.7% had a female householder with no husband present, 39.7% were non-families, and 29.7% of all households were made up of individuals. The average household size was 2.32 and the average family size was 2.90. The median age was 41.0 years.

The median income for a household in the county was $55,658 and the median income for a family was $71,335. Males had a median income of $48,158 versus $38,539 for females. The per capita income for the county was $31,041. About 6.9% of families and 10.5% of the population were below the poverty line, including 14.4% of those under age 18 and 7.5% of those age 65 or over.

=== 2000 census ===
As of the 2000 census, there were 265,612 people, 107,989 households, and 67,709 families living in the county. The population density was 318 inhabitants per square mile (123/km^{2}). There were 122,600 housing units at an average density of 147 per square mile (57/km^{2}). The racial makeup of the county was 95.74% White, 1.06% Black or African American, 0.29% Native American, 1.40% Asian, 0.04% Pacific Islander, 0.35% from other races, and 1.13% from two or more races. 0.95% of the population were Hispanic or Latino of any race.

There were 107,989 households, out of which 30.10% had children under the age of 18 living with them, 50.10% were married couples living together, 9.50% had a female householder with no husband present, and 37.30% were non-families. 28.40% of all households were made up of individuals, and 10.20% had someone living alone who was 65 years of age or older. The average household size was 2.38 and the average family size was 2.95.

In the county, the population was spread out, with 23.30% under the age of 18, 8.40% from 18 to 24, 31.30% from 25 to 44, 23.60% from 45 to 64, and 13.30% who were 65 years of age or older. The median age was 38 years. For every 100 females, there were 93.80 males. For every 100 females age 18 and over, there were 90.20 males.

The median income for a household in the county was $44,048, and the median income for a family was $54,485. Males had a median income of $35,850 versus $27,935 for females. The per capita income for the county was $23,949. About 5.20% of families and 7.90% of the population were below the poverty line, including 9.10% of those under age 18 and 7.40% of those age 65 or over.

19.6% were of English, 15.5% Irish, 9.6% French, 7.8% United States or American, 7.7% Italian, 6.3% French Canadian and 5.9% German ancestry according to Census 2000. 94.4% spoke English and 2.1% French as their first language.

== Government ==
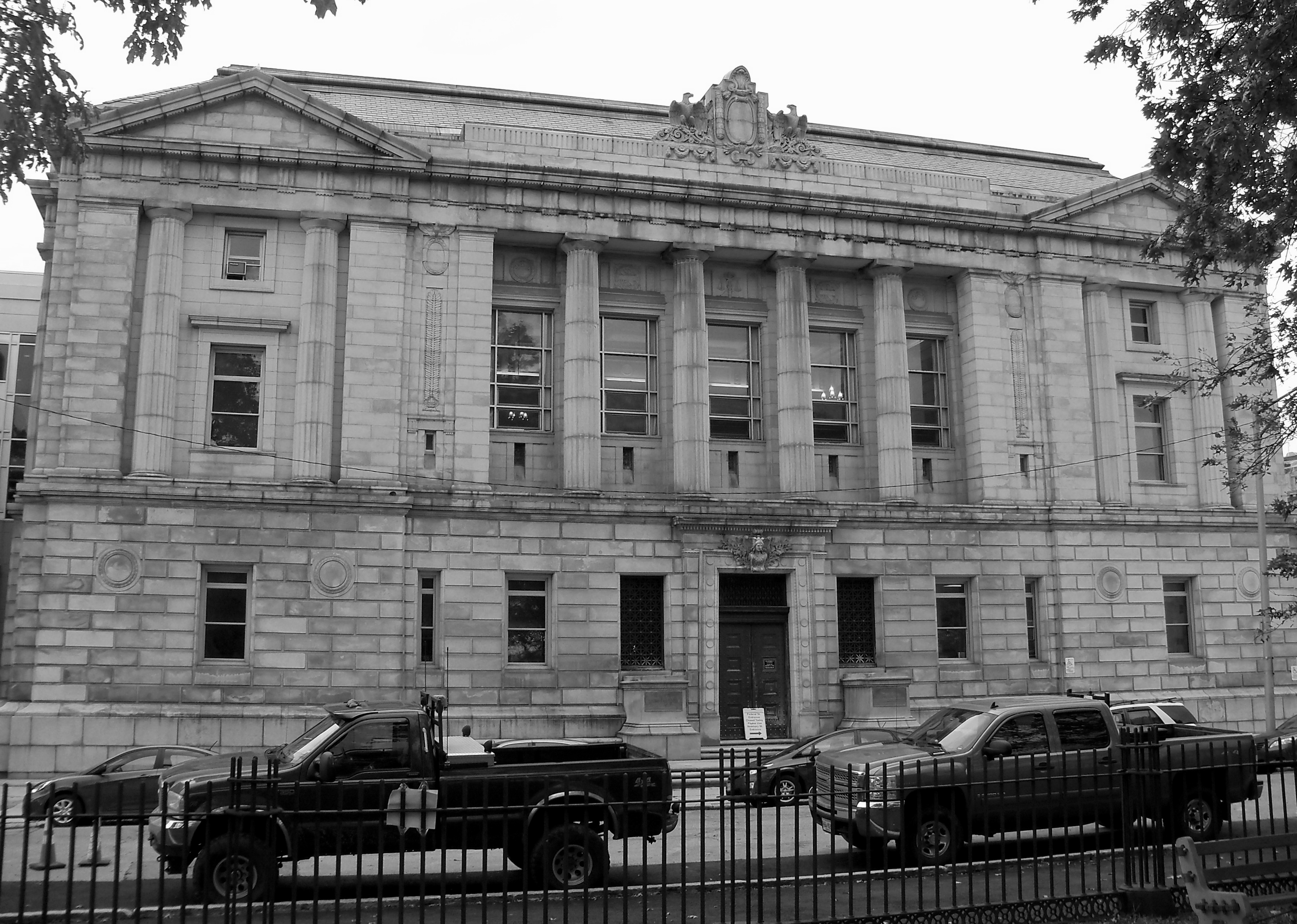
Cumberland County courthouse in Portland, the county seat

Cumberland County is represented by county commissioners and the daily operations are run by a county manager. The county has several responsibilities, including running a Sheriff's department, the Cumberland County Jail, and a county court system. Cumberland County also has its own treasury department, emergency management agency and also has a district attorney office. The county also has a stake in the Cross Insurance Arena (formerly called the Cumberland County Civic Center), as well as programs in local economic development and tourism.

Cumberland County is divided into five districts of approximate equal population, each of which elects one county commissioner. The sheriff is elected countywide and runs the Cumberland County Sheriff's office and the Cumberland County Jail.

== Politics ==
Like the rest of Maine, Cumberland County was a solid Republican county after the Civil War. Between 1860 and 1960, the Republican presidential nominee won Cumberland County in every election except 1912, when the county was won by Democrat Woodrow Wilson following a split in the Republican vote between incumbent president William Howard Taft and Progressive nominee, the former Republican president Theodore Roosevelt. The county remained steadfastly and overwhelmingly Republican even in Franklin D. Roosevelt's huge Democratic landslide win in 1936.

In 1964, Democrat Lyndon B. Johnson won Cumberland County and Maine's 15 other counties as part of a 44-state landslide over controversial Republican nominee Barry Goldwater. Cumberland remained in the Democratic column in 1968, backing Hubert H. Humphrey, who had chosen Maine Senator Edmund Muskie as his running mate. These Democratic victories were a sign of things to come for Cumberland County. Though it would snap back into the Republican column for Richard Nixon in 1972, Republican victories in Cumberland grew increasingly narrower, with Republican Gerald Ford winning it by less than 2,000 votes over Democrat Jimmy Carter in 1976. Carter would narrowly win the county in 1980, marking the first time Cumberland had diverged from the rest of Maine in a presidential election, as the state would be carried by Republican nominee Ronald Reagan.

Reagan would easily carry Cumberland in his 49-state landslide re-election in 1984; however, it was Maine's closest county, with Democrat Walter Mondale losing it by a relatively narrow 13.7%. In 1988, George H. W. Bush would become the last Republican, as of 2024, to carry Cumberland County at the presidential level, winning it by less than seven points. In 1992, Democrat Bill Clinton would win the county with nearly 43% of the vote against Bush and independent Ross Perot; it would be the last time a Democrat would receive less than 50% of the vote in Cumberland County in a presidential election. In 2004, Cumberland would become the most Democratic county in Maine, a position it has retained through 2024. In 2008, over 105,000 ballots would be cast for the Democratic candidate, Barack Obama; it would be the first time a candidate received 100,000 votes in Cumberland County in history. Democrats have exceeded 100,000 votes in Cumberland in each subsequent presidential election. In 2020, Democrat Joe Biden won Cumberland County with 66% of the vote, the most lopsided presidential election result in the county since Lyndon Johnson won 69% of the vote in 1964.

In 2012, the county voted 65% to legalize same-sex marriage.

=== Voter registration ===
Voter registration and party enrollment as of March 2024
Democratic	105,469	46.59%
Unenrolled	61,319	27.09%
Republican	48,741	21.53%
Green Independent	7,804	3.45%
No Labels	2,215	0.98%
Libertarian	826	0.36%
Total	226,374	100%

United States presidential election results for Cumberland County, Maine
Year	Republican		Democratic		Third party(ies)	
Year	No.	%	No.	%	No.	%
1836	3,608	42.85%	4,812	57.15%	0	0.00%
1840	6,790	51.22%	6,438	48.57%	28	0.21%
1844	4,483	39.52%	6,167	54.36%	695	6.13%
1848	4,797	38.28%	5,989	47.80%	1,744	13.92%
1852	4,471	36.19%	6,504	52.65%	1,379	11.16%
1856	8,211	58.34%	5,258	37.36%	605	4.30%
1860	7,934	59.04%	4,815	35.83%	690	5.13%
1864	7,728	54.84%	6,365	45.16%	0	0.00%
1868	9,138	60.18%	6,046	39.82%	0	0.00%
1872	7,491	62.31%	4,531	37.69%	0	0.00%
1876	8,831	54.22%	7,456	45.78%	0	0.00%
1880	10,167	50.75%	9,339	46.62%	528	2.64%
1884	9,510	50.44%	8,170	43.33%	1,175	6.23%
1888	9,880	53.80%	7,975	43.43%	508	2.77%
1892	9,165	51.85%	8,050	45.54%	462	2.61%
1896	11,017	65.32%	5,175	30.68%	674	4.00%
1900	8,824	58.59%	5,770	38.31%	466	3.09%
1904	9,356	62.15%	4,989	33.14%	709	4.71%
1908	10,593	61.81%	5,735	33.46%	810	4.73%
1912	5,154	24.95%	8,480	41.04%	7,027	34.01%
1916	11,768	53.59%	9,795	44.60%	398	1.81%
1920	24,623	69.19%	10,484	29.46%	478	1.34%
1924	26,187	73.31%	7,078	19.82%	2,454	6.87%
1928	33,190	67.74%	15,648	31.94%	158	0.32%
1932	32,864	60.82%	20,655	38.23%	514	0.95%
1936	30,021	55.56%	22,895	42.37%	1,114	2.06%
1940	29,795	52.47%	26,911	47.39%	76	0.13%
1944	29,349	52.15%	26,857	47.72%	72	0.13%
1948	30,284	60.71%	18,913	37.91%	688	1.38%
1952	46,957	69.16%	20,831	30.68%	110	0.16%
1956	49,696	71.88%	19,438	28.12%	0	0.00%
1960	47,271	58.49%	33,553	41.51%	1	0.00%
1964	22,365	30.52%	50,844	69.39%	63	0.09%
1968	32,275	41.35%	44,697	57.27%	1,076	1.38%
1972	51,268	60.59%	33,326	39.38%	23	0.03%
1976	48,959	49.64%	47,007	47.66%	2,660	2.70%
1980	45,820	42.64%	47,337	44.05%	14,304	13.31%
1984	65,842	56.75%	49,894	43.00%	290	0.25%
1988	63,028	52.93%	55,220	46.37%	827	0.69%
1992	45,752	32.33%	60,781	42.95%	34,989	24.72%
1996	42,620	32.88%	69,496	53.62%	17,494	13.50%
2000	58,543	41.05%	74,203	52.03%	9,874	6.92%
2004	65,384	40.12%	94,846	58.20%	2,732	1.68%
2008	56,186	34.23%	105,218	64.10%	2,747	1.67%
2012	57,821	35.30%	101,950	62.25%	4,015	2.45%
2016	57,709	33.59%	102,981	59.94%	11,128	6.48%
2020	59,584	30.75%	128,759	66.45%	5,422	2.80%
2024	59,964	31.12%	127,971	66.42%	4,721	2.45%

== Communities ==
=== Cities ===
- Portland (county seat)
- South Portland
- Westbrook

=== Towns ===
- Baldwin
- Bridgton
- Brunswick
- Cape Elizabeth
- Casco
- Chebeague Island
- Cumberland
- Falmouth
- Freeport
- Frye Island
- Gorham
- Gray
- Harpswell
- Harrison
- Long Island
- Naples
- New Gloucester
- North Yarmouth
- Pownal
- Raymond
- Scarborough
- Sebago
- Standish
- Windham
- Yarmouth

=== Census-designated places ===
- Bridgton
- Brunswick
- Casco
- Cousins Island
- Cumberland Center
- Dunstan
- Falmouth
- Falmouth Foreside
- Freeport
- Gorham
- Gray
- Little Falls
- Littlejohn Island
- Naples
- North Windham
- Oak Hill (known as "Scarborough" prior to 2020)
- Standish
- Steep Falls
- South Windham
- Yarmouth

=== Other unincorporated communities ===
- Bailey Island
- Brunswick Station
- Higgins Beach
- North Bridgton
- Orr's Island
- Prouts Neck
- Sebago Lake
- South Casco
- South Freeport

== Education ==
School districts include:

- Brunswick School Department
- Cape Elizabeth School Department
- Chebeague Island School Department
- Falmouth Public Schools
- Gorham School District
- Long Island School District
- Portland Public Schools
- Regional School Unit No. 05
- Regional School Unit No. 14
- Scarborough Public Schools
- School Administrative District 06
- School Administrative District 15
- School Administrative District 17
- School Administrative District 55
- School Administrative District 61
- School Administrative District 51
- School Administrative District 75
- Sebago Public Schools
- South Portland School Department
- Westbrook School Department
- Yarmouth School Department

Governor Baxter School for the Deaf, a state-owned school, is in the county.

University of Maine School of Law is located in downtown Portland.

== In popular culture ==
The fictional town of Jerusalem's Lot, featured in the vampire novel 'Salem's Lot by Stephen King, is situated in Cumberland County. King makes passing reference to other nearby towns and cities, including Portland, Falmouth, and Westbrook.

The video game Trauma Team takes place in Cumberland County in the year 2020, referencing Portland and its Back Cove neighborhood. Neither actual hospital housed in Portland is mentioned in-game; instead, a fictional trauma center called Resurgam First Care is fabricated for the plot (in real life, Portland's city motto is "Resurgam", Latin for "I will rise again"). Two other fictional places are mentioned that reference the county name: "Cumberland College" and "Cumberland Institute of Forensic Medicine".

== See also ==
- National Register of Historic Places listings in Cumberland County, Maine
