= 1964 United States presidential election in Maine =

- November 3, 1964

Nominee	Lyndon B. Johnson	Barry Goldwater
Party	Democratic	Republican
Home state	Texas	Arizona
Running mate	Hubert Humphrey	William E. Miller
Electoral vote	4	0
Popular vote	262,264	118,701
Percentage	68.80%	31.14%

Johnson
50–60%
60–70%
70–80%
80–90%
90–100%
Goldwater
50–60%
60–70%
70–80%
80–90%
90–100%
Tie
40–50%
President before election
Lyndon B. Johnson
Democratic
Elected President
Lyndon B. Johnson
Democratic

The 1964 United States presidential election in Maine took place on November 3, 1964, as part of the 1964 United States presidential election, which was held throughout all fifty states and D.C. Voters chose four representatives, or electors to the Electoral College, who voted for president and vice president.

Maine was won by incumbent Democratic President Lyndon B. Johnson of Texas in a landslide over Republican U.S. Senator Barry Goldwater of Arizona. Johnson took 68.8% of the vote to Goldwater's 31.14%, a victory margin of 37.66 percentage points, and the strongest-ever performance by a Democrat in the state. Johnson became the first Democrat since Woodrow Wilson in 1912 to carry this longstanding liberal Republican stronghold, and the first since Franklin Pierce in 1852 to win the state with an outright majority. Even amidst a national Democratic landslide, Maine weighed-in in this election as more than 15 points to the left of the nation at-large.

Johnson carried Maine by a wide margin of 37.66%, making him the first Democratic candidate since Franklin Pierce in 1852 to win a majority (Wilson won the state in 1912 with only a plurality of 39.43%). Johnson was also the first Democrat to sweep all of Maine's counties.

He was the first Democrat to carry Somerset County since Martin Van Buren in 1836, the first since Pierce to carry the counties of Franklin, Oxford, Penobscot and Piscataquis and the first since Winfield S. Hancock in 1880 to carry Aroostook County. Populous Cumberland County, along with Lincoln County, had last voted Democratic for Woodrow Wilson in 1912, while the counties of Hancock, Knox and Waldo had last supported a Democrat when giving Wilson a plurality in 1916.

This would prove the last occasion Waldo County voted for a Democratic presidential candidate until 1996, (Note: Waldo County did give a plurality to Independent H. Ross Perot in 1992.) and last when Hancock, Knox, and Lincoln Counties would support a Democratic presidential nominee until Bill Clinton in 1992. Johnson's 80.14% in Androscoggin County is also the last time, as of 2020, that any candidate has broken 80% in any Maine county, and the first time that a Democrat has done so since 1836. Johnson's winning margin of over 143,000 votes is the largest in history for a Democratic presidential candidate in Maine, only beaten by Republican Dwight D. Eisenhower's over 146,000 margin in 1956.

== Results ==
1964 United States presidential election in Maine
Party	Candidate	Votes	Percentage	Electoral votes
Democratic (inc.)	Lyndon B. Johnson	262,264	68.80%	4
Republican	Barry Goldwater	118,701	31.14%	0
Write-ins	Write-ins	256	0.07%	0
Totals		381,221	100.00%	4
Voter Turnout (Voting age/Registered)				65%/73%

=== Results by county ===
County	Lyndon B. Johnson Democratic		Barry Goldwater Republican		Various Candidates Write-ins		Margin		Total votes cast
County	#	%	#	%	#	%	#	%	Total votes cast
Androscoggin	30,080	80.14%	7,441	19.82%	14	0.04%	22,639	60.32%	37,535
Aroostook	17,552	63.71%	9,994	36.28%	3	0.01%	7,558	27.43%	27,549
Cumberland	50,844	69.39%	22,365	30.52%	63	0.09%	28,479	38.87%	73,272
Franklin	5,784	66.69%	2,887	33.29%	2	0.02%	2,897	33.40%	8,673
Hancock	7,415	53.98%	6,304	45.89%	18	0.13%	1,111	8.09%	13,737
Kennebec	24,813	68.65%	11,307	31.28%	23	0.06%	13,506	37.37%	36,143
Knox	7,022	61.43%	4,404	38.53%	4	0.03%	2,618	22.90%	11,430
Lincoln	5,099	56.07%	3,984	43.81%	11	0.12%	1,115	12.26%	9,094
Oxford	13,616	71.76%	5,340	28.14%	19	0.10%	8,276	43.62%	18,975
Penobscot	28,766	66.54%	14,449	33.42%	17	0.04%	14,317	33.12%	43,232
Piscataquis	4,781	65.84%	2,473	34.06%	7	0.10%	2,308	31.78%	7,261
Sagadahoc	7,006	71.93%	2,733	28.06%	1	0.01%	4,273	43.87%	9,740
Somerset	10,694	70.11%	4,541	29.77%	18	0.12%	6,153	40.34%	15,253
Waldo	5,397	61.87%	3,324	38.11%	2	0.02%	2,073	23.76%	8,723
Washington	9,312	70.88%	3,816	29.05%	9	0.07%	5,496	41.83%	13,137
York	34,083	71.80%	13,339	28.10%	45	0.09%	20,744	43.70%	47,467
Totals	262,264	68.80%	118,701	31.14%	256	0.07%	143,563	37.66%	381,221

==== Counties that flipped from Republican to Democratic ====
- Aroostook
- Cumberland
- Franklin
- Hancock
- Kennebec
- Knox
- Lincoln
- Oxford
- Penobscot
- Piscataquis
- Sagadahoc
- Somerset
- Waldo
- Washington

== Analysis ==
Ever since the Republican Party formed in 1854 to stop the spread of slavery into the territories, Maine and nearby Vermont had been rock-ribbed Republican, except during the split of 1912, when Maine went to Woodrow Wilson with less than forty percent of the vote. As recently as 1956, Dwight D. Eisenhower had won over seventy percent of the vote in the state for the GOP.

However, at the same time the GOP was turning its attention from the declining rural Yankee counties to the growing and traditionally Democratic Catholic vote, along with the conservative Sun Belt whose growth was driven by air conditioning. This growth meant that activist Republicans centred in the traditionally Democratic, but by the 1960s, middle-class Sun Belt had become much more conservative than the majority of members in the historic Northeastern GOP stronghold.

The consequence of this was that a bitterly divided Grand Old Party was able to nominate the staunchly conservative Senator Barry Goldwater of Arizona, who ran with the equally conservative Republican National Committee chair, Congressman William E. Miller of New York. The staunch conservative Goldwater was widely seen in the liberal Northeastern United States as a right-wing extremist; he had voted against the Civil Rights Act of 1964, and the Johnson campaign portrayed him as a warmonger who as president would provoke a nuclear war.

In contrast to New York, Pennsylvania, New Jersey, Massachusetts, Connecticut, Rhode Island and Michigan, Goldwater did not write upper New England off from the beginning of his presidential campaign before Kennedy's assassination. However, Goldwater's self-avowed extremism was such that he was the first Republican disendorsed by many newspapers in the region since the party was founded. Polls never gave any doubt that Goldwater would lose Maine, despite considerable September campaigning by running mate Miller.

== See also ==
- United States presidential elections in Maine
