= 1880 United States presidential election in Maine =

- November 2, 1880
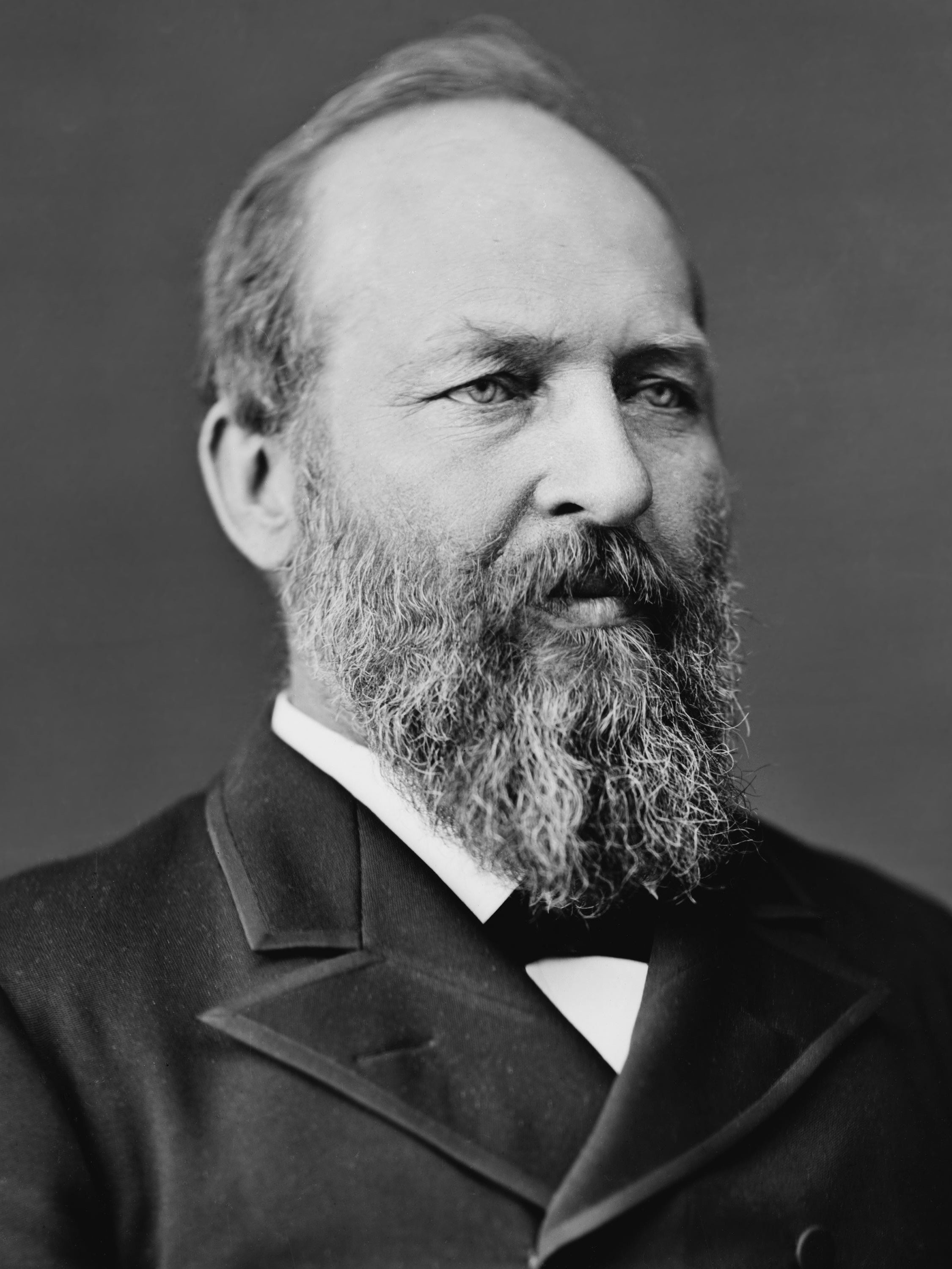

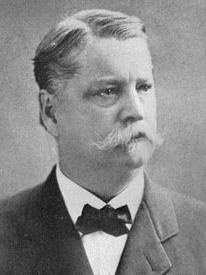
| Nominee | James A. Garfield | Winfield Scott Hancock |
| Party | Republican | Democratic |
| Home state | Ohio | Pennsylvania |
| Running mate | Chester A. Arthur | William Hayden English |
| Electoral vote | 7 | 0 |
| Popular vote | 74,052 | 65,211 |
| Percentage | 51.46% | 45.32% |
County results
Garfield
50–60%
60–70%
Hancock
50–60%
President before election
Rutherford B. Hayes
Republican
Elected President
James A. Garfield
Republican

The 1880 United States presidential election in Maine took place on November 2, 1880, as part of the 1880 United States presidential election. Voters chose seven representatives, or electors to the Electoral College, who voted for president and vice president.

Maine voted for the Republican nominee, James A. Garfield, over the Democratic nominee, Winfield Scott Hancock. Garfield won the state by a narrow margin of 6.14%. Hancock's relatively strong showing was due to his firm stance against immigration, toward which Garfield was relatively favorable, but which was a major issue for Maine voters who feared immigration would depress their wages. He proved the only Democrat to carry any of Maine's counties between 1868 and 1896 inclusive, and was the last to carry Aroostook County until Lyndon B. Johnson in 1964, and the last to carry Lincoln County and Waldo County until Woodrow Wilson in 1912.

== Results ==
1880 United States presidential election in Maine
| Party | Candidate | Running mate | Popular vote | | Electoral vote | |
| Party | Candidate | Running mate | Count | % | Count | % |
|---|---|---|---|---|---|---|
| Republican | James Abram Garfield of Ohio | Chester Alan Arthur of New York | 74,052 | 51.46% | 7 | 100.00% |
| Democratic | Winfield Scott Hancock of Pennsylvania | William Hayden English of Indiana | 65,211 | 45.32% | 0 | 0.00% |
| Greenback | James Baird Weaver of Iowa | Barzillai Jefferson Chambers of Texas | 4,409 | 3.06% | 0 | 0.00% |
| N/A | Others | Others | 139 | 0.10% | 0 | 0.00% |
| Prohibition | Neal Dow of Maine | Henry Adams Thompson of Ohio | 92 | 0.06% | 0 | 0.00% |
| Total | | | 143,903 | 100.00% | 7 | 100.00% |

=== Results by county ===
| County | James Abram Garfield Republican | | Winfield Scott Hancock Democratic | | James Baird Weaver Greenback | | Various candidates Other parties | | Margin | | Total votes cast |
| County | # | % | # | % | # | % | # | % | # | % | Total votes cast |
|---|---|---|---|---|---|---|---|---|---|---|---|
| Androscoggin | 4,974 | 52.76% | 4,215 | 44.71% | 207 | 2.20% | 32 | 0.34% | 759 | 8.05% | 9,428 |
| Aroostook | 2,560 | 47.81% | 2,738 | 51.14% | 37 | 0.69% | 19 | 0.35% | -178 | -3.32% | 5,354 |
| Cumberland | 10,167 | 50.75% | 9,339 | 46.62% | 487 | 2.43% | 41 | 0.20% | 828 | 4.13% | 20,034 |
| Franklin | 2,390 | 51.49% | 2,178 | 46.92% | 72 | 1.55% | 2 | 0.04% | 212 | 4.57% | 4,642 |
| Hancock | 4,314 | 52.81% | 3,698 | 45.27% | 137 | 1.68% | 20 | 0.24% | 616 | 7.54% | 8,169 |
| Kennebec | 7,771 | 59.00% | 5,001 | 37.97% | 385 | 2.92% | 15 | 0.11% | 2,770 | 21.03% | 13,172 |
| Knox | 2,880 | 41.28% | 3,659 | 52.45% | 415 | 5.95% | 22 | 0.32% | -779 | -11.17% | 6,976 |
| Lincoln | 2,669 | 47.18% | 2,890 | 51.09% | 98 | 1.73% | 0 | 0.00% | -221 | -3.91% | 5,657 |
| Oxford | 4,354 | 50.75% | 3,969 | 46.26% | 251 | 2.93% | 6 | 0.07% | 385 | 4.49% | 8,580 |
| Penobscot | 8,186 | 52.21% | 6,307 | 40.23% | 1,157 | 7.38% | 29 | 0.18% | 1,879 | 11.98% | 15,679 |
| Piscataquis | 1,943 | 56.83% | 1,330 | 38.90% | 145 | 4.24% | 1 | 0.03% | 613 | 17.93% | 3,419 |
| Sagadahoc | 2,932 | 61.84% | 1,761 | 37.14% | 31 | 0.65% | 17 | 0.36% | 1,171 | 24.70% | 4,741 |
| Somerset | 4,090 | 50.74% | 3,526 | 43.74% | 440 | 5.46% | 5 | 0.06% | 564 | 7.00% | 8,061 |
| Waldo | 2,748 | 40.25% | 3,848 | 56.36% | 220 | 3.22% | 11 | 0.16% | -1,100 | -16.11% | 6,827 |
| Washington | 4,361 | 53.97% | 3,622 | 44.82% | 98 | 1.21% | 0 | 0.00% | 739 | 9.14% | 8,081 |
| York | 7,700 | 51.23% | 7,090 | 47.18% | 228 | 1.52% | 11 | 0.07% | 610 | 4.06% | 15,029 |
| Totals | 74,039 | 51.47% | 65,171 | 45.31% | 4,408 | 3.06% | 231 | 0.16% | 8,868 | 6.16% | 143,849 |

== See also ==
- United States presidential elections in Maine
