= 1852 United States presidential election in Maine =

- November 2, 1852

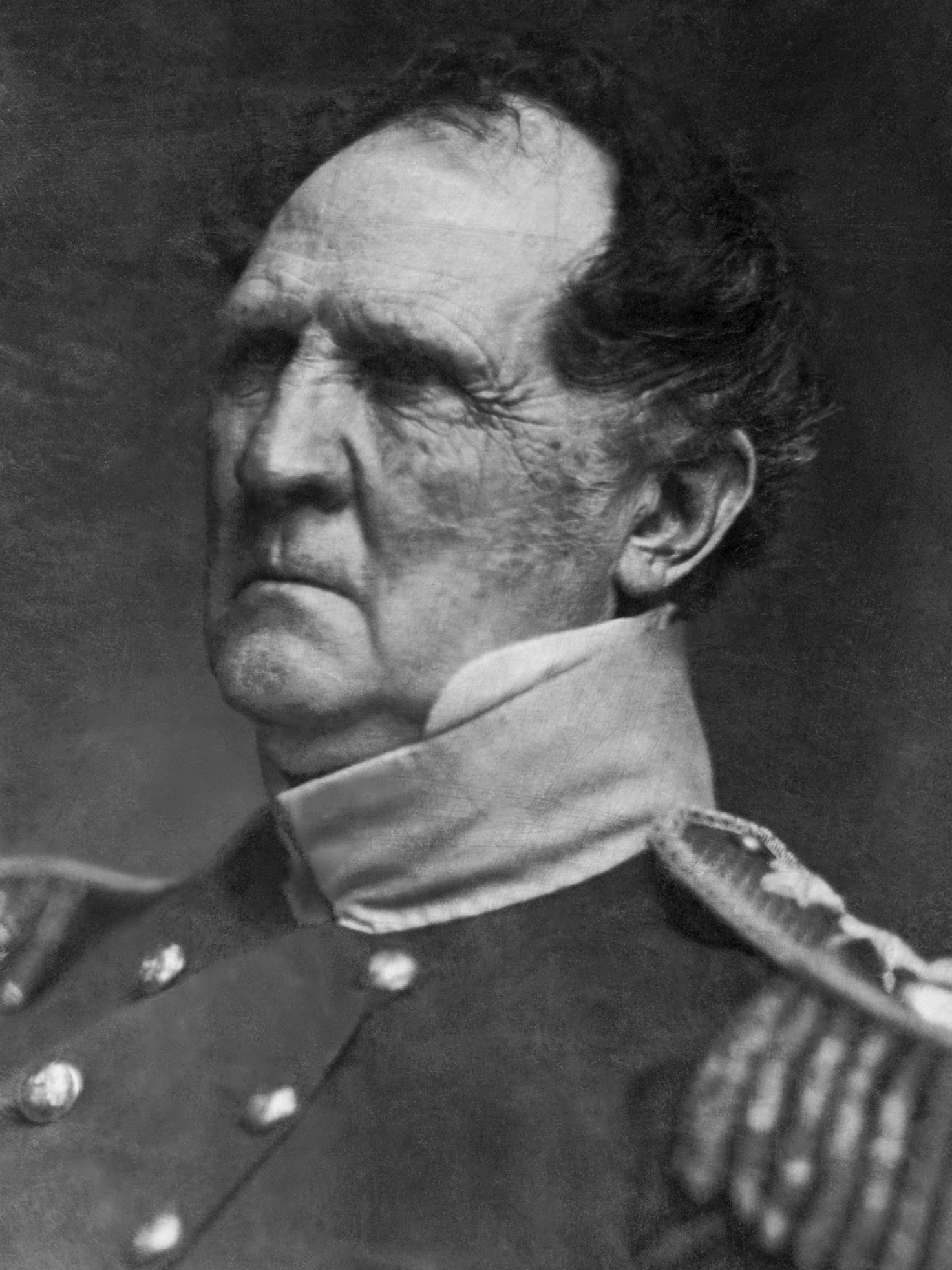

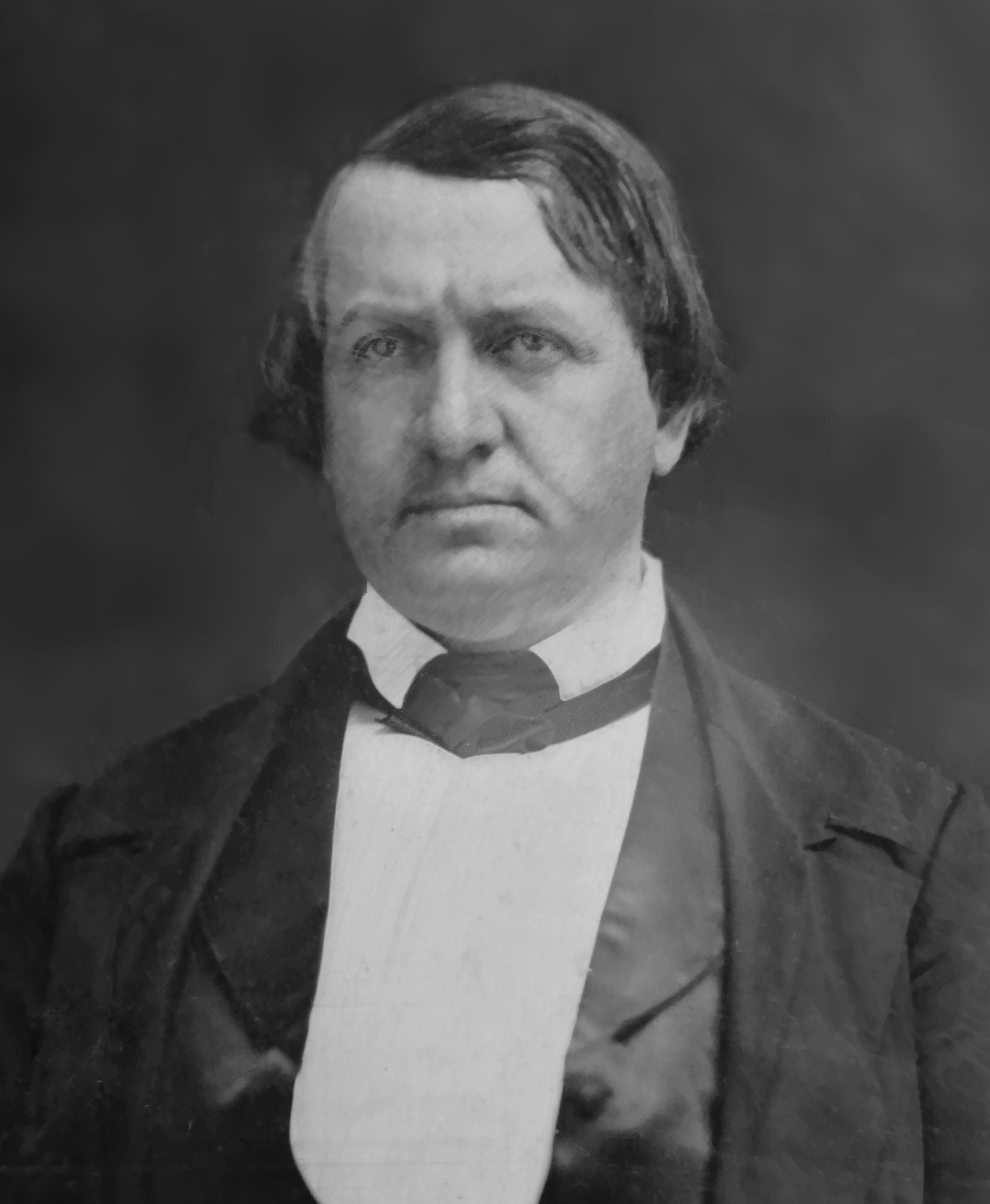
Nominee	Franklin Pierce	Winfield Scott	John P. Hale
Party	Democratic	Whig	Free Soil
Home state	New Hampshire	New Jersey	New Hampshire
Running mate	William R. King	William Alexander Graham	George W. Julian
Electoral vote	8	0	0
Popular vote	41,609	32,543	8,030
Percentage	50.63%	39.60%	9.77%
County results
Pierce
40–50%
50–60%
60–70%
Scott
40–50%
50–60%
President before election
Millard Fillmore
Whig
Elected President
Franklin Pierce
Democratic

The 1852 United States presidential election in Maine took place on November 2, 1852, as part of the 1852 United States presidential election. Voters chose eight representatives, or electors to the Electoral College, who voted for President and Vice President.

Maine voted for the Democratic candidate, Franklin Pierce, over the Whig Party candidate, Winfield Scott. Pierce won the state by a margin of 11.03%.

Pierce would be the last Democratic candidate to win Maine's electoral votes until Woodrow Wilson won a narrow plurality in Maine in 1912 and the last one until Lyndon B. Johnson in 1964 to win a majority of the popular vote. This would be the last occasion until 1880 that a Democrat carried any county in the state, the last until 1964 that a Democratic presidential candidate won Franklin County, Oxford County, Penobscot County or Piscataquis County, and the last until 1912 that a Democrat carried Cumberland County, Hancock County, Washington County or York County.

== Results ==
1852 United States presidential election in Maine
Party	Candidate	Running mate	Popular vote		Electoral vote	
Party	Candidate	Running mate	Count	%	Count	%
Democratic	Franklin Pierce of New Hampshire	William R. King of Alabama	41,609	50.63%	8	100.00%
Whig	Winfield Scott of New Jersey	William Alexander Graham of North Carolina	32,543	39.60%	0	0.00%
Free Soil	John P. Hale of New Hampshire	George W. Julian of Indiana	8,030	9.77%	0	0.00%
Total			82,182	100.00%	8	100.00%

== See also ==
- United States presidential elections in Maine
