= Gorham School District =

School district in Gorham, Maine, United States

Gorham School Department

Address
- 75 South St, Suite 2 Gorham, ME Gorham, Cumberland, Maine, 04038; United States

District information
- Type: Public
- Motto: Prepare and inspire!
- Grades: K-12
- Superintendent: Heather Perry
- Asst. superintendent(s): Quinton Donahue
- School board: Gorham School Committee
- Schools: 5
- NCES District ID: 2306060

Students and staff
- Students: 2,751
- District mascot: Ram
- Colors

Other information
- Website: www.gorhamschools.org

Gorham School Department is a public school district located in Gorham, Maine.

It serves Grades K-12 throughout 5 schools. The superintendent, since 2015, has been Heather Perry. The assistant superintendent since 2024 has been Quinton Donahue.

== Schools ==
School name	Opened	Grades	Address	Principal	Assistant Principal (s)	Student Population
Gorham High School (Maine)	1959	9-12	41 Morrill Ave, Gorham ME, 04038	Brian Jandreau	Christina Cifelli Marc Sawyer	810 (23-24)
Gorham Middle School	2003	6-8	106 Weeks Rd, Gorham ME, 04038	Lucas Witham	Vanessa Nickerson	668(23-24)
Great Falls Elementary School	2011	K-5	72 Justice Way, Gorham ME, 04038	Rebecca Fortier	Deanna Etienne	496 (23-24)
Narragansett Elementary School	1981	K-5	284 Main St, Gorham ME, 04038	Erin Eppler	Sean Hanson	352 (23-24)
Village Elementary School	1963	K-5	12 Robie St, Gorham ME, 04038	Jodi Mezzanotte	Cheryl Fotter	428 (23-24)

== Athletics ==
The district offers the following athletics to students in middle and high school:

Middle School:

-Soccer (Boys and Girls)

-Cross Country (Boys and Girls)

-Field Hockey (Girls only)

-Tennis

-Basketball (Boys and Girls)

-Indoor Track (Boys and Girls)

High School:

-Cheerleading (Fall, Winter)

-Cross Country (Boys and Girls)

-Field Hockey (Girls)

-Football

-Golf (Co-ed)

-Soccer (Boys and Girls)

-Volleyball (Girls)

-Ice Hockey (Boys and Girls)

-Basketball (Boys, Girls, Unified)

-Indoor Track (Boys and Girls)

-Swimming (Boys and Girls)

-Wrestling (with Westbrook High School)

-Alpine Skiing

-Baseball (Boys)

-Softball (Girls)

-Lacrosse (Boys and Girls)

-Outdoor Track and Field (Boys and Girls)

-Tennis (Boys and Girls)
