= 1844 United States presidential election in Maine =

- November 11, 1844

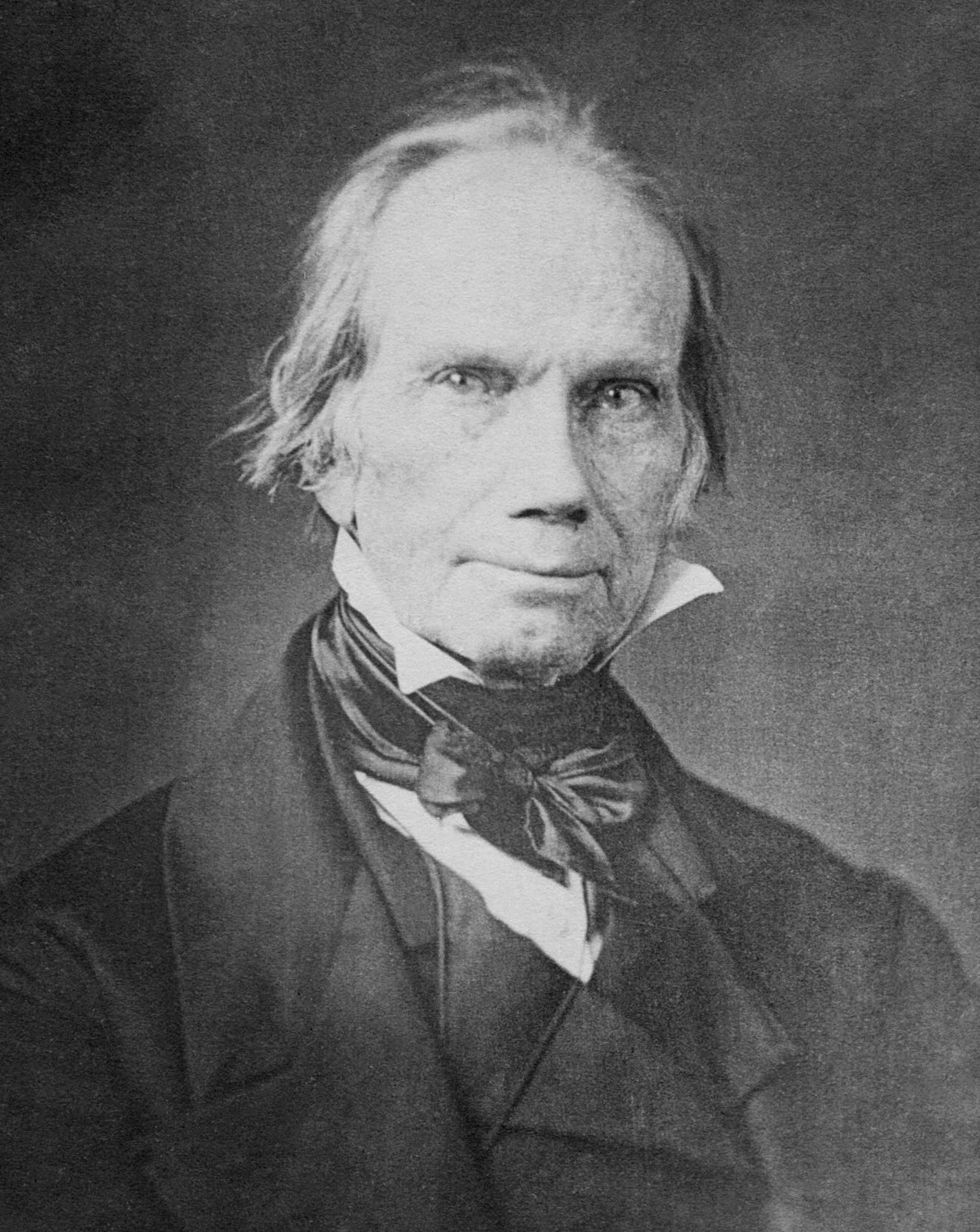

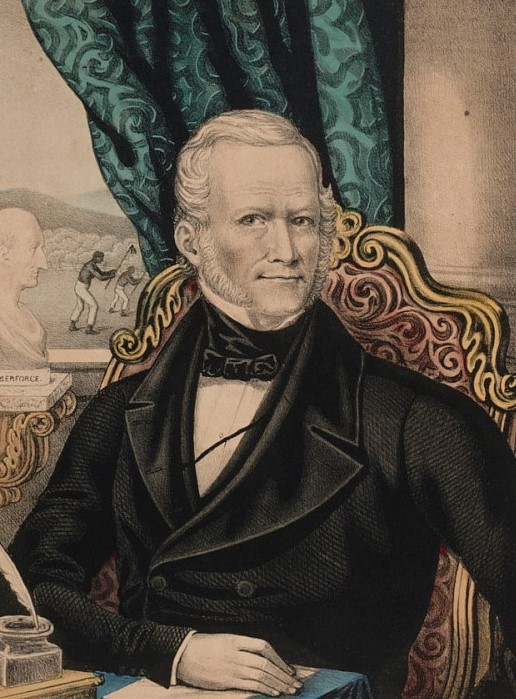
Nominee	James K. Polk	Henry Clay	James G. Birney
Party	Democratic	Whig	Liberty
Home state	Tennessee	Kentucky	Michigan
Running mate	George M. Dallas	Theodore Frelinghuysen	Thomas Morris
Electoral vote	9	0	0
Popular vote	45,719	34,378	4,836
Percentage	53.83%	40.48%	5.69%
County results
Polk
40–50%
50–60%
60–70%
Clay
40–50%
50–60%
President before election
John Tyler
Independent
Elected President
James K. Polk
Democratic

A presidential election was held in Maine on November 11, 1844 as part of the 1844 United States presidential election. Voters chose nine representatives, or electors to the Electoral College, who voted for President and Vice President.

Maine voted for the Democratic candidate, James K. Polk, over Whig candidate Henry Clay. Polk won Maine by a margin of 13.35%.

With 5.69% of the popular vote, Maine would prove to be James G. Birney's fifth strongest state after New Hampshire, Massachusetts, Vermont and Michigan.

== Results ==
1844 United States presidential election in Maine
Party	Candidate	Running mate	Popular vote		Electoral vote	
Party	Candidate	Running mate	Count	%	Count	%
Democratic	James K. Polk of Tennessee	George M. Dallas of Pennsylvania	45,719	53.83%	9	100.00%
Whig	Henry Clay of Kentucky	Theodore Frelinghuysen of New York	34,378	40.48%	0	0.00%
Liberty	James G. Birney of Michigan	Thomas Morris of Ohio	4,836	5.69%	0	0.00%
Total			84,933	100.00%	9	100.00%

=== By county ===
County (Note: This vote breakdown by county is based from the Daily Courant Extra released on January 17, 1845. It lists Polk's total votes from Maine as 45,719, same as other sources. But it also lists Clay's Maine votes as 34,346 (a difference of -32), and Birney's Maine votes as 4,837 (a difference of 1). Birney's votes are listed under "Abol.")	James K. Polk Democratic		Henry Clay Whig		James G. Birney Liberty		Margin		Total
County	Votes	%	Votes	%	Votes	%	Votes	%	Total
Aroostook	907	68.40%	398	30.02%	21	1.58%	509	38.39%	1,326
Cumberland	6,367	55.15%	4,483	38.83%	694	6.01%	1,884	16.32%	11,544
Franklin	1,609	51.36%	1,132	36.13%	392	12.51%	477	15.23%	3,133
Hancock	2,608	57.17%	1,849	40.53%	105	2.30%	759	16.64%	4,562
Kennebec	3,535	37.25%	5,393	56.83%	561	5.91%	-1,858	-19.58%	9,489
Lincoln	5,354	51.58%	4,566	43.99%	460	4.43%	788	7.59%	10,380
Oxford	4,395	65.80%	1,887	28.25%	397	5.94%	2,508	37.55%	6,679
Penobscot	4,895	54.74%	3,346	37.42%	701	7.84%	1,549	17.32%	8,942
Piscataquis	1,136	46.60%	1,074	44.05%	228	9.35%	62	2.54%	2,438
Somerset	2,530	43.52%	2,848	48.99%	435	7.48%	-318	-5.47%	5,813
Waldo	4,661	68.51%	1,826	26.84%	316	4.65%	2,835	41.67%	6,803
Washington	2,605	52.03%	2,328	46.49%	74	1.48%	277	5.53%	5,007
York	5,117	58.24%	3,216	36.60%	453	5.16%	25,579	34.31%	8,786

== See also ==
- United States presidential elections in Maine
