= 1904 United States presidential election in Maine =

- November 8, 1904
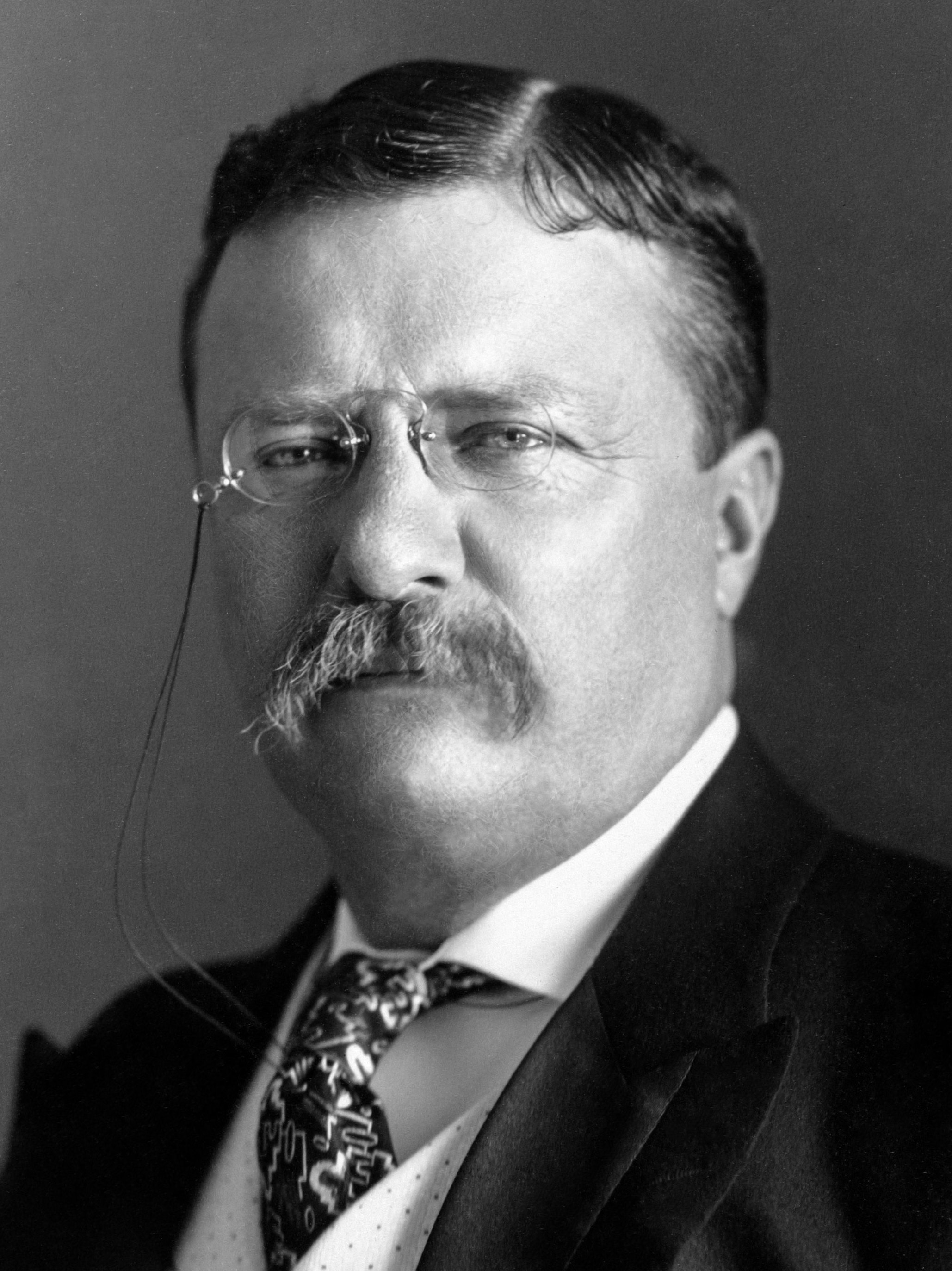

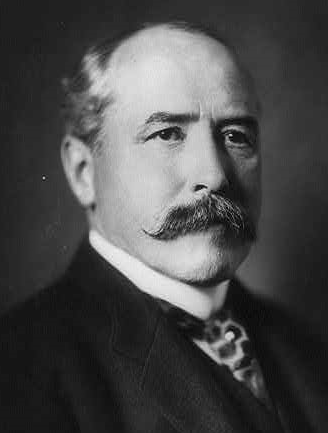
Nominee	Theodore Roosevelt	Alton B. Parker
Party	Republican	Democratic
Home state	New York	New York
Running mate	Charles W. Fairbanks	Henry G. Davis
Electoral vote	6	0
Popular vote	65,432	27,642
Percentage	67.44%	28.49%
County results
Roosevelt
50–60%
60–70%
70–80%
80–90%
President before election
Theodore Roosevelt
Republican
Elected President
Theodore Roosevelt
Republican

The 1904 United States presidential election in Maine took place on November 8, 1904, as part of the 1904 United States presidential election. Voters chose six representatives, or electors to the Electoral College, who voted for president and vice president.

Maine overwhelmingly voted for the Republican nominee, President Theodore Roosevelt, over the Democratic nominee, former Chief Judge of New York Court of Appeals Alton B. Parker. Roosevelt won Maine by a margin of 38.95%.

== Results ==
1904 United States presidential election in Maine
Party	Candidate	Running mate	Popular vote		Electoral vote	
Party	Candidate	Running mate	Count	%	Count	%
Republican	Theodore Roosevelt of New York (incumbent)	Charles Warren Fairbanks of Indiana	65,432	67.44%	6	100.00%
Democratic	Alton Brooks Parker of New York	Henry Gassaway Davis of West Virginia	27,642	28.49%	0	0.00%
Socialist	Eugene Victor Debs of Indiana	Benjamin Hanford of New York	2,102	2.17%	0	0.00%
Prohibition	Silas Comfort Swallow of Pennsylvania	George Washington Carroll of Texas	1,510	1.56%	0	0.00%
Populist	Thomas Edward Watson of Georgia	Thomas Tibbles of Nebraska	337	0.35%	0	0.00%
Total			97,023	100.00%	6	100.00%

=== Results by county ===
County	Theodore Roosevelt Republican		Alton Brooks Parker Democratic		Eugene Victor Debs Socialist		Silas Comfort Swallow Prohibition		Thomas Edward Watson Populist		Margin		Total votes cast
County	#	%	#	%	#	%	#	%	#	%	#	%	Total votes cast
Androscoggin	4,393	62.31%	2,206	31.29%	333	4.72%	85	1.21%	33	0.47%	2,187	31.02%	7,050
Aroostook	4,681	83.19%	736	13.08%	25	0.44%	178	3.16%	7	0.12%	3,945	70.11%	5,627
Cumberland	9,356	62.15%	4,989	33.14%	513	3.41%	179	1.19%	17	0.11%	4,367	29.01%	15,054
Franklin	2,135	72.25%	755	25.55%	9	0.30%	46	1.56%	10	0.34%	1,380	46.70%	2,955
Hancock	3,430	67.15%	1,558	30.50%	62	1.21%	41	0.80%	17	0.33%	1,872	36.65%	5,108
Kennebec	5,765	68.68%	2,333	27.79%	154	1.83%	119	1.42%	23	0.27%	3,432	40.89%	8,394
Knox	2,538	54.78%	1,866	40.28%	143	3.09%	42	0.91%	44	0.95%	672	14.50%	4,633
Lincoln	1,794	60.55%	1,065	35.94%	44	1.48%	47	1.59%	13	0.44%	729	24.61%	2,963
Oxford	3,883	69.33%	1,565	27.94%	50	0.89%	87	1.55%	17	0.30%	2,318	41.39%	5,601
Penobscot	7,013	73.64%	2,225	23.36%	66	0.69%	149	1.56%	70	0.74%	4,788	50.28%	9,523
Piscataquis	2,043	74.51%	616	22.47%	2	0.07%	71	2.59%	10	0.36%	1,427	52.04%	2,742
Sagadahoc	1,948	66.76%	754	25.84%	88	3.02%	120	4.11%	8	0.27%	1,194	40.92%	2,918
Somerset	3,716	68.99%	1,324	24.58%	265	4.92%	67	1.24%	14	0.26%	2,392	44.41%	5,386
Waldo	2,248	65.35%	1,092	31.74%	39	1.13%	44	1.28%	17	0.49%	1,156	33.61%	3,440
Washington	3,393	64.58%	1,691	32.19%	92	1.75%	61	1.16%	17	0.32%	1,702	32.39%	5,254
York	7,096	68.41%	2,866	27.63%	217	2.09%	174	1.68%	20	0.19%	4,230	40.78%	10,373
Totals	65,432	67.44%	27,641	28.49%	2,102	2.17%	1,510	1.56%	337	0.35%	37,791	38.95%	97,021

== See also ==
- United States presidential elections in Maine
