= 1876 United States presidential election in Maine =

- November 7, 1876
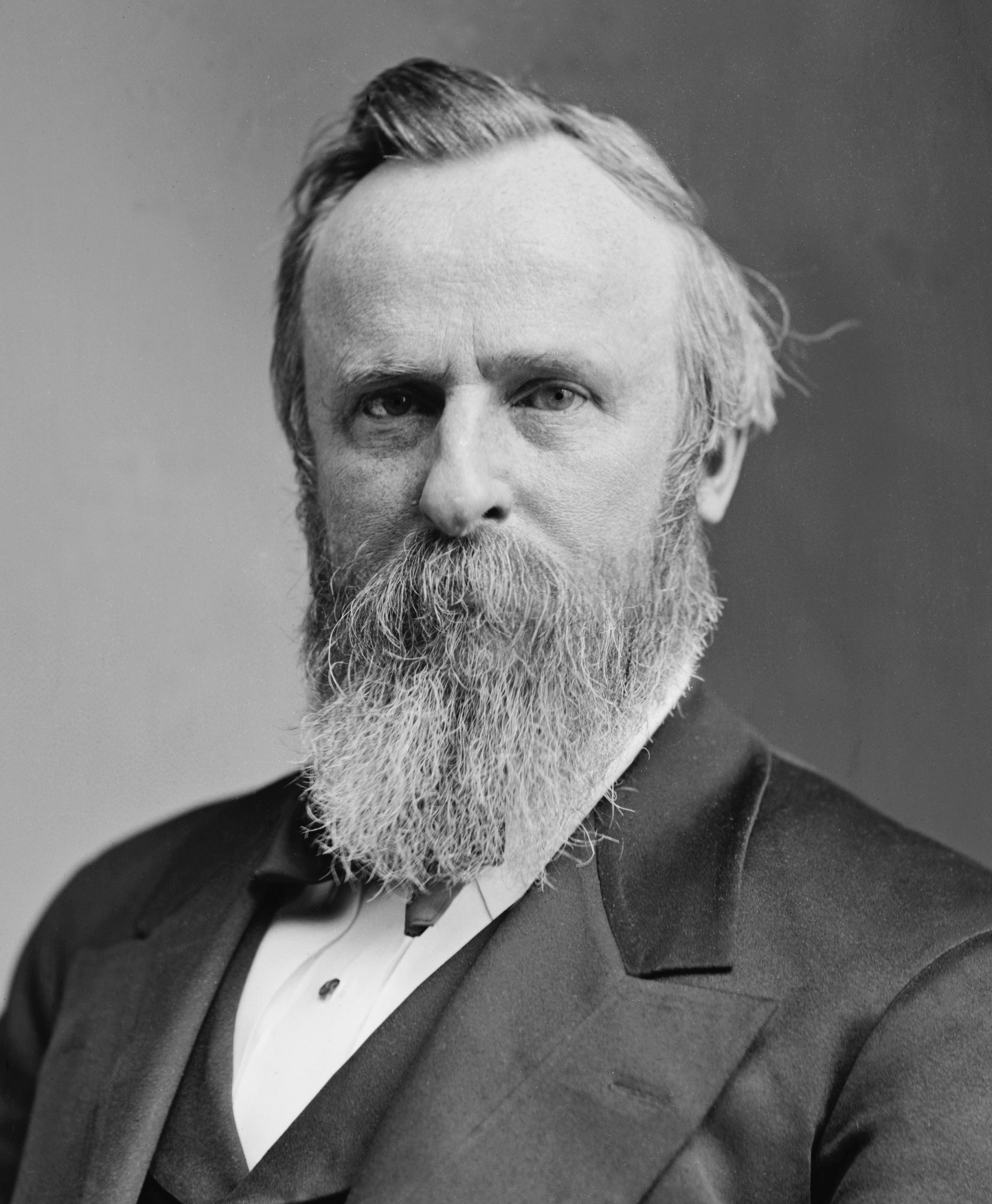

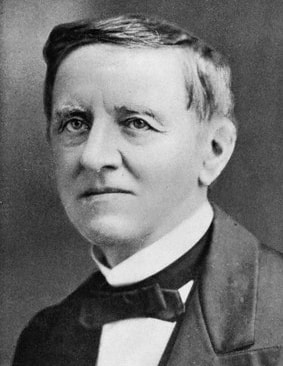
Nominee	Rutherford B. Hayes	Samuel J. Tilden
Party	Republican	Democratic
Home state	Ohio	New York
Running mate	William A. Wheeler	Thomas A. Hendricks
Electoral vote	7	0
Popular vote	66,300	49,917
Percentage	56.64%	42.65%
County results
Hayes
50–60%
60–70%
President before election
Ulysses S. Grant
Republican
Elected President
Rutherford B. Hayes
Republican

The 1876 United States presidential election in Maine took place on November 7, 1876, as part of the 1876 United States presidential election. Voters chose seven representatives, or electors to the Electoral College, who voted for president and vice president.

Maine voted for the Republican nominee, Rutherford B. Hayes, over the Democratic nominee, Samuel J. Tilden. Hayes won the state by a margin of 13.99%.

== Results ==
1876 United States presidential election in Maine
Party	Candidate	Running mate	Popular vote		Electoral vote	
Party	Candidate	Running mate	Count	%	Count	%
Republican	Rutherford B. Hayes of Ohio	William A. Wheeler of New York	66,300	56.64%	7	100.00%
Democratic	Samuel J. Tilden of New York	Thomas A. Hendricks of Indiana	49,917	42.65%	0	0.00%
N/A	Others	Others	828	0.71%	0	0.00%
Total			117,045	100.00%	7	100.00%

== See also ==
- United States presidential elections in Maine
