= 1916 United States presidential election in Maine =

- November 7, 1916
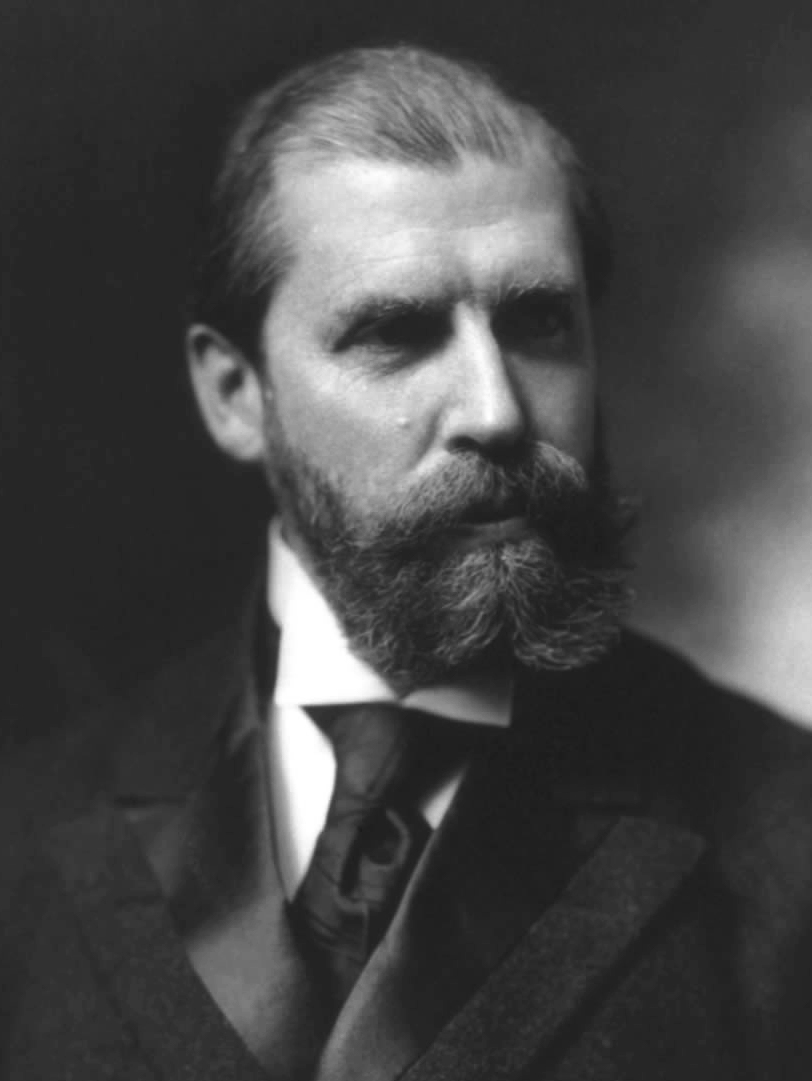

Nominee	Charles Evans Hughes	Woodrow Wilson
Party	Republican	Democratic
Home state	New York	New Jersey
Running mate	Charles W. Fairbanks	Thomas R. Marshall
Electoral vote	6	0
Popular vote	69,508	64,033
Percentage	50.99%	46.97%
County results
Hughes
40–50%
50–60%
60–70%
Wilson
40–50%
50–60%
President before election
Woodrow Wilson
Democratic
Elected President
Woodrow Wilson
Democratic

The 1916 United States presidential election in Maine took place on November 7, 1916, as part of the 1916 United States presidential election, held throughout all the contemporary 48 states. Voters chose six representatives, or electors to the Electoral College, who voted for president and vice president.

Maine was won by the Republican nominee, U.S. Supreme Court Justice Charles Evans Hughes of New York, and his running mate Senator Charles W. Fairbanks of Indiana. They defeated Democratic nominees, incumbent Democratic President Woodrow Wilson and Vice President Thomas R. Marshall.

Hughes won Maine by a narrow margin of 4.02 percentage points. Nevertheless, Wilson won the election nationally by a narrow margin of 23 electoral votes. This was the last time until 1932 in which a county in Maine voted for a Democrat.

== Results ==
1916 United States presidential election in Maine
Party	Candidate	Running mate	Popular vote		Electoral vote	
Party	Candidate	Running mate	Count	%	Count	%
Republican	Charles Evans Hughes of New York	Charles Warren Fairbanks of Indiana	69,508	50.99%	6	100.00%
Democratic	Woodrow Wilson of New Jersey	Thomas Riley Marshall of Indiana	64,033	46.97%	0	0.00%
Socialist	Allan Louis Benson of New York	George Ross Kirkpatrick of New Jersey	2,177	1.60%	0	0.00%
Prohibition	James Franklin Hanly of Indiana	Ira Landrith of Tennessee	596	0.44%	0	0.00%
Total			136,314	100.00%	6	100.00%

=== Results by county ===
County	Charles Evans Hughes Republican		Thomas Woodrow Wilson Democratic		Allan Louis Benson Socialist		James Franklin Hanly Prohibition		Margin		Total votes cast
County	#	%	#	%	#	%	#	%	#	%	Total votes cast
Androscoggin	4,496	43.71%	5,464	53.12%	279	2.71%	47	0.46%	-968	-9.41%	10,286
Aroostook	5,770	69.58%	2,425	29.24%	48	0.58%	50	0.60%	3,345	40.34%	8,293
Cumberland	11,768	53.59%	9,795	44.60%	321	1.46%	77	0.35%	1,973	8.98%	21,961
Franklin	1,988	49.89%	1,908	47.88%	63	1.58%	26	0.65%	80	2.01%	3,985
Hancock	3,192	48.14%	3,303	49.81%	115	1.73%	21	0.32%	-111	-1.67%	6,631
Kennebec	6,731	53.71%	5,527	44.11%	223	1.78%	50	0.40%	1,204	9.61%	12,531
Knox	2,211	37.82%	3,434	58.74%	179	3.06%	22	0.38%	-1,223	-20.92%	5,846
Lincoln	1,781	49.97%	1,718	48.20%	51	1.43%	14	0.39%	63	1.77%	3,564
Oxford	4,026	51.73%	3,625	46.58%	98	1.26%	33	0.42%	401	5.15%	7,782
Penobscot	7,324	49.41%	7,294	49.21%	135	0.91%	70	0.47%	30	0.20%	14,823
Piscataquis	2,142	54.16%	1,763	44.58%	30	0.76%	20	0.51%	379	9.58%	3,955
Sagadahoc	1,828	49.01%	1,791	48.02%	91	2.44%	20	0.54%	37	0.99%	3,730
Somerset	3,567	51.24%	3,134	45.02%	236	3.39%	24	0.34%	433	6.22%	6,961
Waldo	2,418	47.58%	2,539	49.96%	104	2.05%	21	0.41%	-121	-2.38%	5,082
Washington	3,891	52.24%	3,459	46.44%	62	0.83%	37	0.50%	432	5.80%	7,449
York	6,375	47.45%	6,854	51.02%	142	1.06%	64	0.48%	-479	-3.57%	13,435
Totals	69,508	50.99%	64,033	46.97%	2,177	1.60%	596	0.44%	5,475	4.02%	136,314

== See also ==
- United States presidential elections in Maine
