= 1836 United States presidential election in Maine =

- November 7, 1836
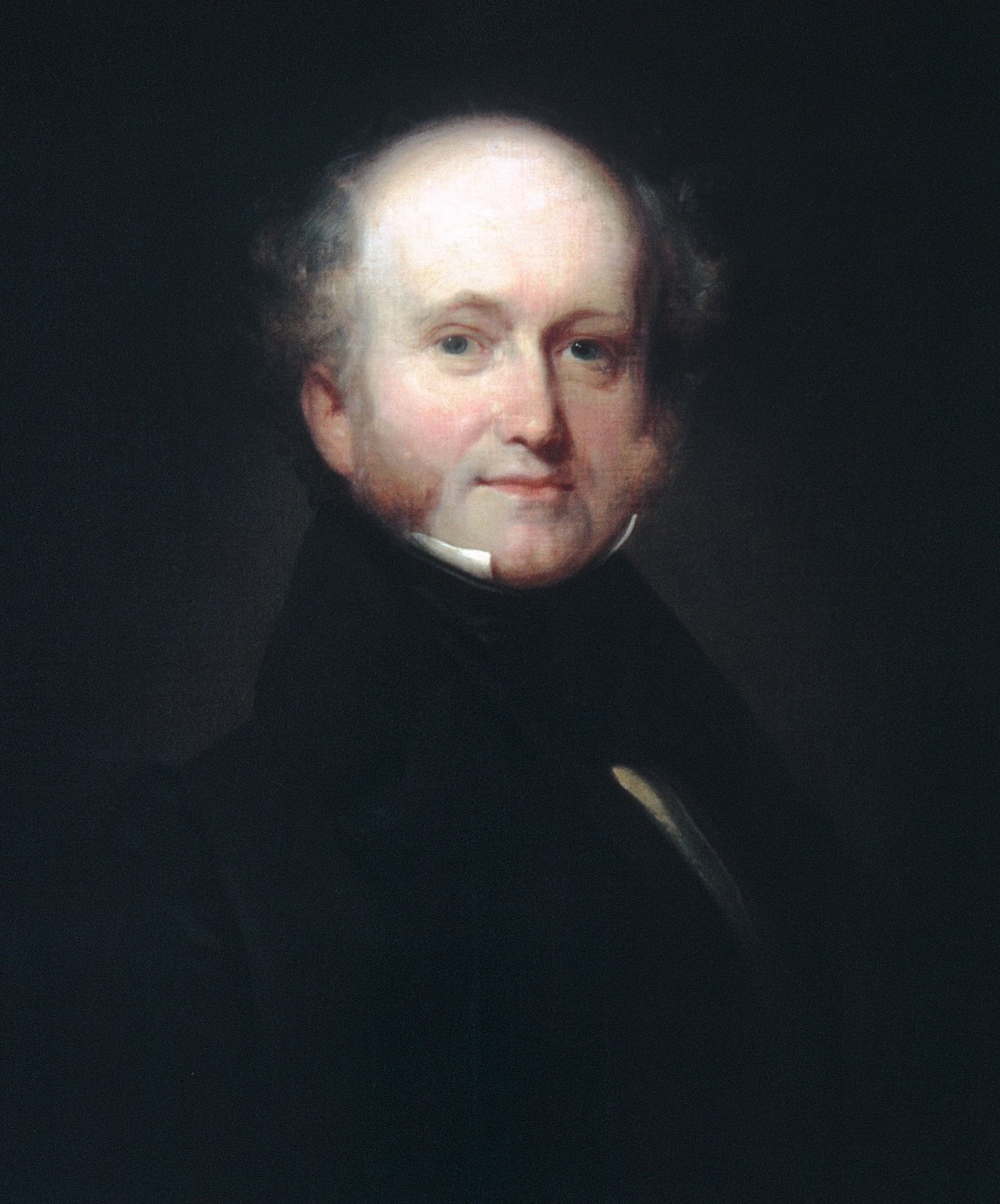

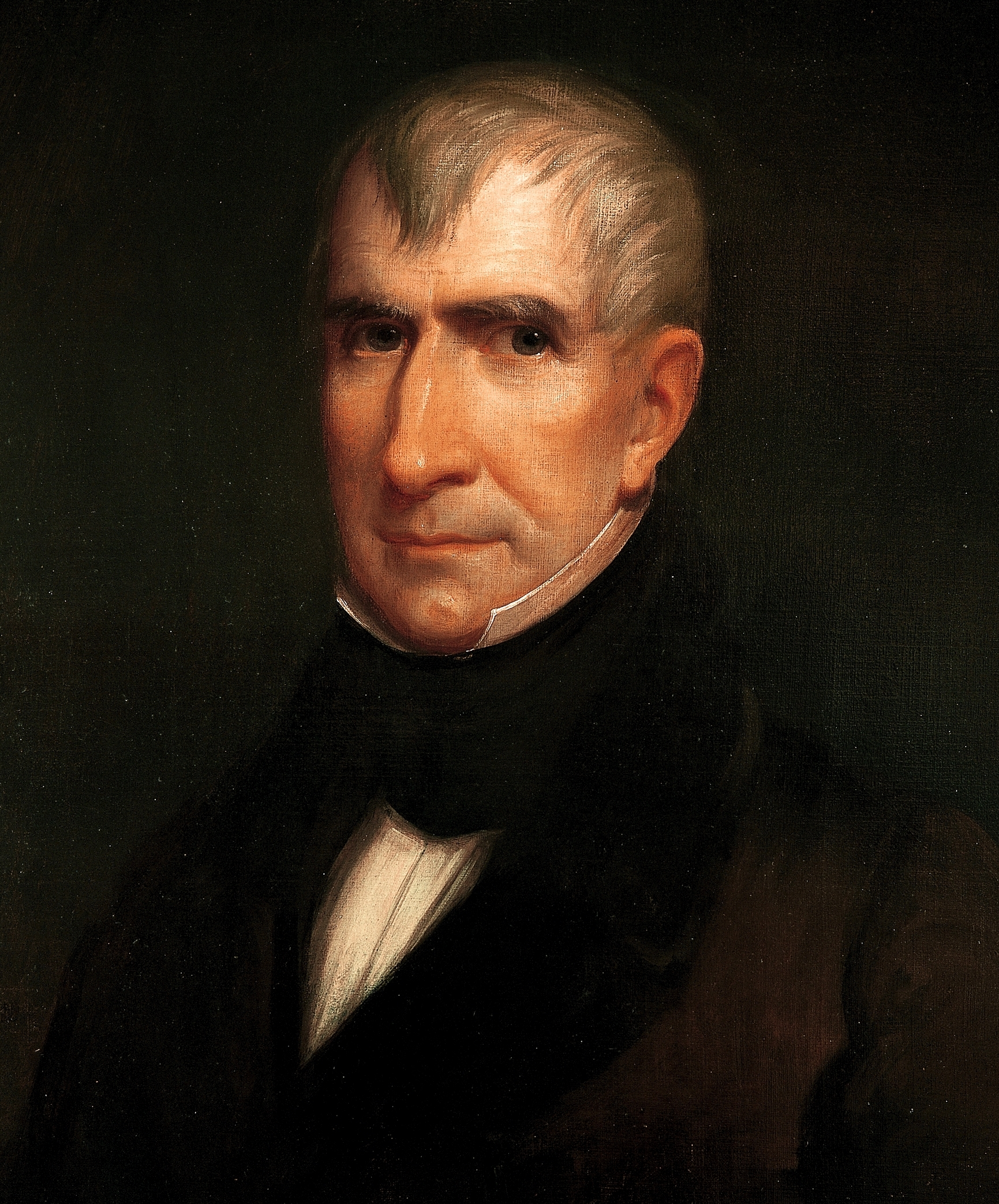
Nominee	Martin Van Buren	William Henry Harrison
Party	Democratic	Whig
Home state	New York	Ohio
Running mate	Richard Mentor Johnson	Francis Granger
Electoral vote	10	0
Popular vote	22,825	14,803
Percentage	58.92%	38.21%
County results
Van Buren
50–60%
60–70%
70–80%
80–90%
Harrison
50–60%
President before election
Andrew Jackson
Democratic
Elected President
Martin Van Buren
Democratic

A presidential election was held in Maine on November 7, 1836 as part of the 1836 United States presidential election. Voters chose ten representatives, or electors to the Electoral College, who voted for President and Vice President.

Maine voted for the Democratic candidate, Martin Van Buren, over Whig candidate William Henry Harrison. Van Buren won the state by a margin of 20.71%.

Van Buren would be the final Democratic presidential candidate until Lyndon B. Johnson in 1964 to carry Somerset County.

== Results ==
1836 United States presidential election in Maine
Party	Candidate	Votes	Percentage	Electoral votes
Democratic	Martin Van Buren	22,825	58.92%	10
Whig	William Henry Harrison	14,803	38.21%	0
N/A	Other	1,112	2.87%	0
Totals		38,740	100.0%	10

== See also ==
- United States presidential elections in Maine
