= 1912 United States presidential election in Maine =

- November 5, 1912

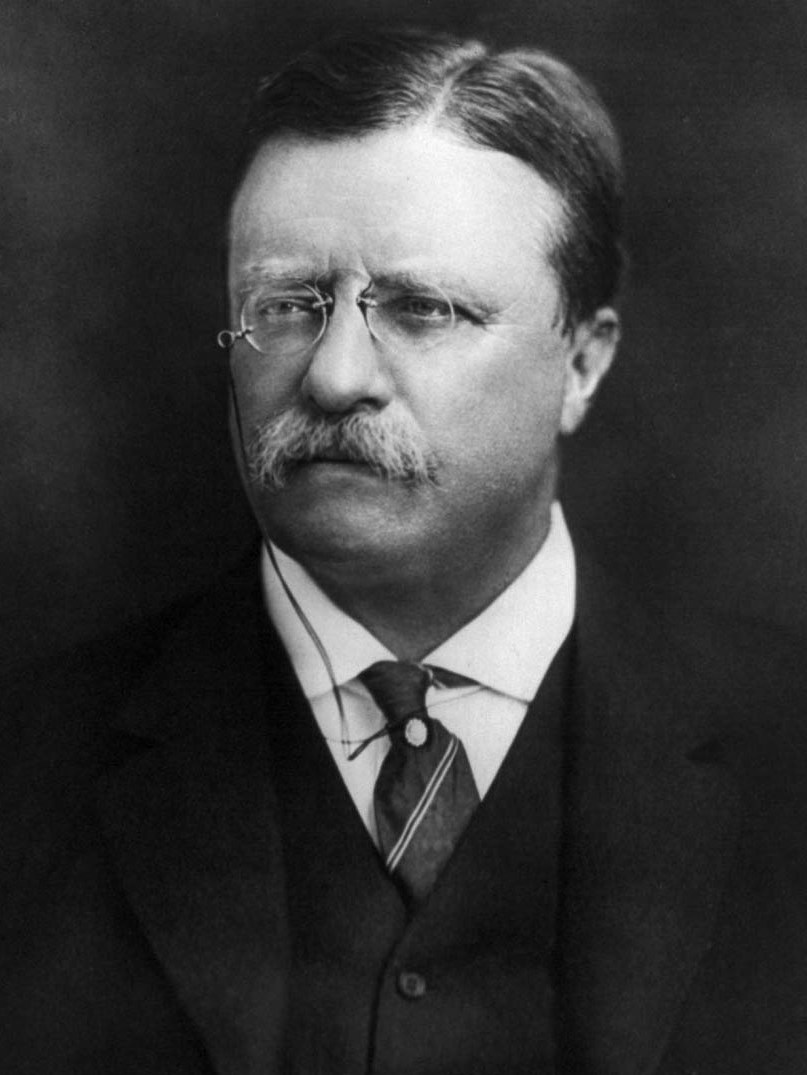

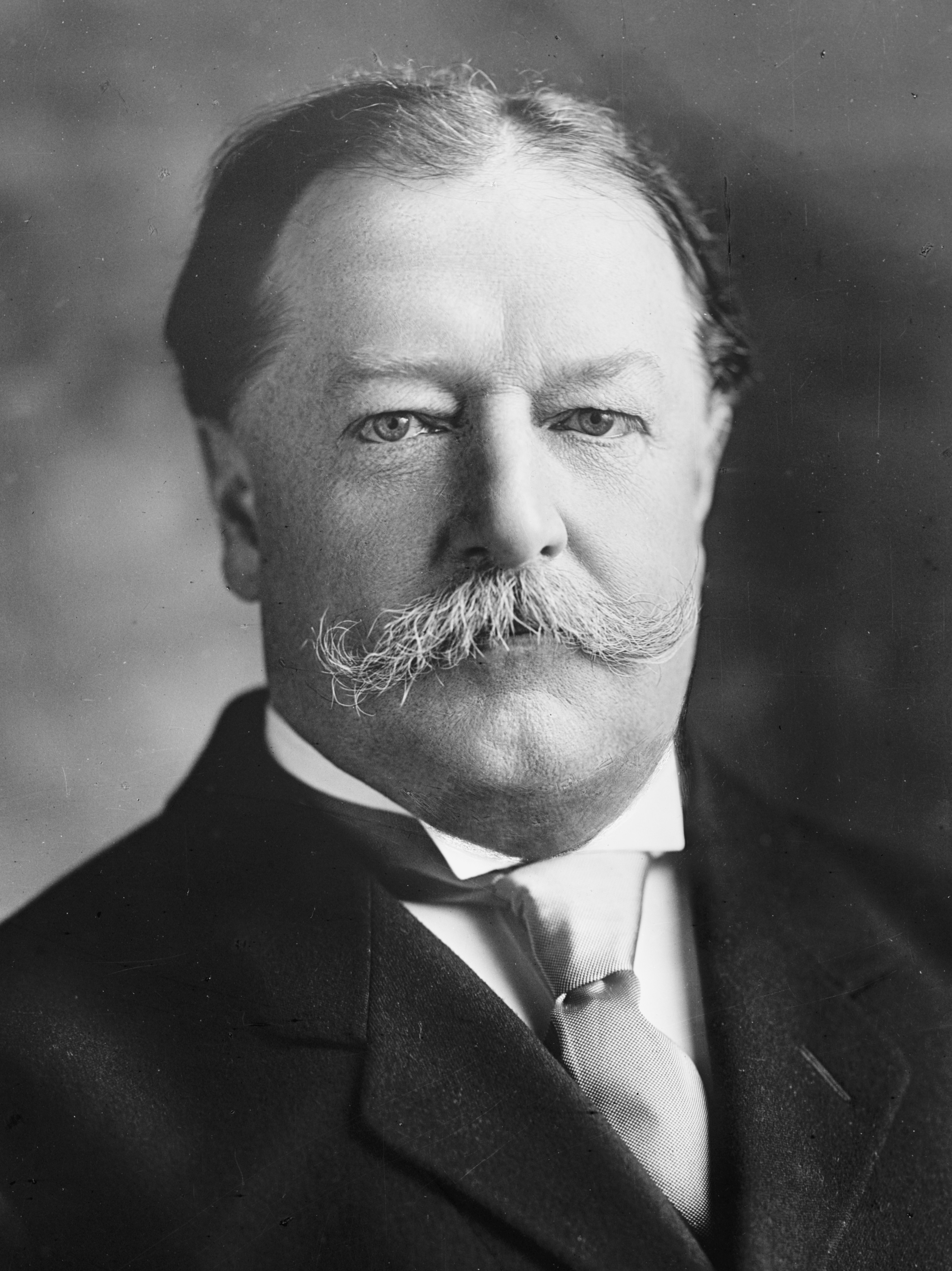
Nominee	Woodrow Wilson	Theodore Roosevelt	William Howard Taft
Party	Democratic	Progressive	Republican
Home state	New Jersey	New York	Ohio
Running mate	Thomas R. Marshall	Hiram Johnson	Nicholas Murray Butler
Electoral vote	6	0	0
Popular vote	51,113	48,495	26,545
Percentage	39.43%	37.41%	20.48%
County results
Wilson
30–40%
40–50%
50–60%
Roosevelt
30–40%
40–50%
60–70%
President before election
William Howard Taft
Republican
Elected President
Woodrow Wilson
Democratic

The 1912 United States presidential election in Maine took place on November 5, 1912, as part of the 1912 United States presidential election which was held throughout all contemporary 48 states. Voters chose six representatives, or electors to the Electoral College, who voted for president and vice president. Maine was won by the Democratic nominees, New Jersey Governor Woodrow Wilson and Indiana Governor Thomas R. Marshall. Wilson and Marshall defeated incumbent President William Howard Taft, and his running mate Vice President James S. Sherman and Progressive Party candidates, former President Theodore Roosevelt and his running mate California Governor Hiram Johnson.

Wilson won Maine by a narrow margin of 2.02%, becoming the first Democratic presidential candidate since Franklin Pierce in 1852 to win the state. This would be the final time until Lyndon B. Johnson won the state in 1964 where a Democratic presidential candidate would carry Maine. This is one of only two such cases since 1852 where Maine has not voted for the same candidate as fellow New England state Vermont, the other being 1968.

This was the only state that Wilson won in either of his two victories that would never support fellow Democrat Franklin D. Roosevelt in any of his landslide victories in the 1930s and 1940s. Lincoln County and Waldo County voted Democratic for the first time since 1880. Androscoggin, Cumberland, Hancock, Knox, Sagadahoc, Washington, and York counties voted Democratic for the first time since 1852.

With 37.41% of the popular vote, Maine would prove to be Roosevelt's fifth strongest state in terms of popular vote percentage in the 1912 election after South Dakota, California, Michigan and Minnesota.

The Maine Republican Party supported Theodore Roosevelt during the 1912 Republican presidential primaries against President William Howard Taft. The Progressive Party was founded by Roosevelt supporters on July 31, 1912, at a convention in Portland, Maine. The Republicans was weakened after losing members including Charles H. Hitchborn, who was the treasurer of the party, although Warren C. Philbrook, the chair of the party, remained. Roosevelt's largest amount of support came from Aroostook County where he received over sixty percent of the vote. Three-fourths of Roosevelt's votes, worth 38,000 votes, came from Republicans while the remainder, worth 10,000 votes, came from Democrats.

== Results ==
1912 United States presidential election in Maine
Party	Candidate	Running mate	Popular vote		Electoral vote	
Party	Candidate	Running mate	Count	%	Count	%
Democratic	Woodrow Wilson of New Jersey	Thomas Riley Marshall of Indiana	51,113	39.43%	6	100.00%
Progressive	Theodore Roosevelt of New York	Hiram Warren Johnson of California	48,495	37.41%	0	0.00%
Republican	William Howard Taft of Ohio (incumbent)	Nicholas Murray Butler of New York	26,545	20.48%	0	0.00%
Socialist	Eugene Victor Debs of Indiana	Emil Seidel of Wisconsin	2,541	1.96%	0	0.00%
Prohibition	Eugene Wilder Chafin of Illinois	Aaron Sherman Watkins of Ohio	946	0.73%	0	0.00%
Total			129,640	100.00%	6	100.00%

=== Results by county ===
County	Thomas Woodrow Wilson Democratic		William Howard Taft Republican		Theodore Roosevelt Progressive "Bull Moose"		Eugene Victor Debs Socialist		Eugene Wilder Chafin Prohibition		Margin (Note: Because Wilson finished first and Roosevelt second in Maine as a whole and in all but one county, margin given is Wilson vote minus Roosevelt vote and percentage margin Wilson percentage minus Roosevelt percentage unless otherwise stated.)		Total votes cast
County	#	%	#	%	#	%	#	%	#	%	#	%	Total votes cast
Androscoggin	4,516	44.38%	859	8.44%	4,424	43.47%	316	3.11%	61	0.60%	92	0.91%	10,176
Aroostook	1,924	24.63%	898	11.49%	4,799	61.42%	100	1.28%	92	1.18%	-2,875	-36.79%	7,813
Cumberland	8,480	41.04%	5,154	24.95%	6,537	31.64%	355	1.72%	135	0.65%	1,943	9.40%	20,661
Franklin	1,421	37.36%	668	17.56%	1,633	42.93%	38	1.00%	43	1.13%	-212	-5.57%	3,804
Hancock	2,655	43.09%	1,399	22.70%	1,932	31.35%	156	2.53%	20	0.32%	723	11.74%	6,162
Kennebec	4,397	37.82%	1,782	15.33%	5,196	44.69%	175	1.51%	76	0.65%	-799	-6.87%	11,626
Knox	2,751	50.03%	1,097	19.95%	1,392	25.31%	233	4.24%	26	0.47%	1,359	24.72%	5,499
Lincoln	1,633	43.89%	457	12.28%	1,527	41.04%	83	2.23%	21	0.56%	106	2.85%	3,721
Oxford	2,941	39.79%	1,234	16.69%	3,068	41.50%	111	1.50%	38	0.51%	-127	-1.71%	7,392
Penobscot	5,093	36.17%	3,367	23.91%	5,294	37.59%	145	1.03%	183	1.30%	-201	-1.42%	14,082
Piscataquis	1,210	32.10%	807	21.41%	1,705	45.23%	20	0.53%	28	0.74%	-495	-13.13%	3,770
Sagadahoc	1,331	38.06%	885	25.31%	1,129	32.28%	108	3.09%	44	1.26%	202	5.78%	3,497
Somerset	2,317	36.45%	1,235	19.43%	2,479	39.00%	286	4.50%	39	0.61%	-162	-2.55%	6,356
Waldo	2,145	44.31%	881	18.20%	1,636	33.79%	146	3.02%	33	0.68%	509	10.52%	4,841
Washington	3,178	44.44%	1,862	26.03%	1,993	27.87%	86	1.20%	33	0.46%	1,185	16.57%	7,152
York	5,121	39.12%	3,960	30.25%	3,751	28.66%	183	1.40%	74	0.57%	1,161 (Note: In this county where Taft did run second ahead of Roosevelt, margin given is Wilson vote minus Taft vote and percentage margin Wilson percentage minus Taft percentage.)	8.87%	13,089
Totals	51,113	39.43%	26,545	20.48%	48,495	37.41%	2,541	1.96%	946	0.73%	2,618	2.02%	129,641

== See also ==
- United States presidential elections in Maine
