= 1840 United States presidential election in Maine =

- November 2, 1840
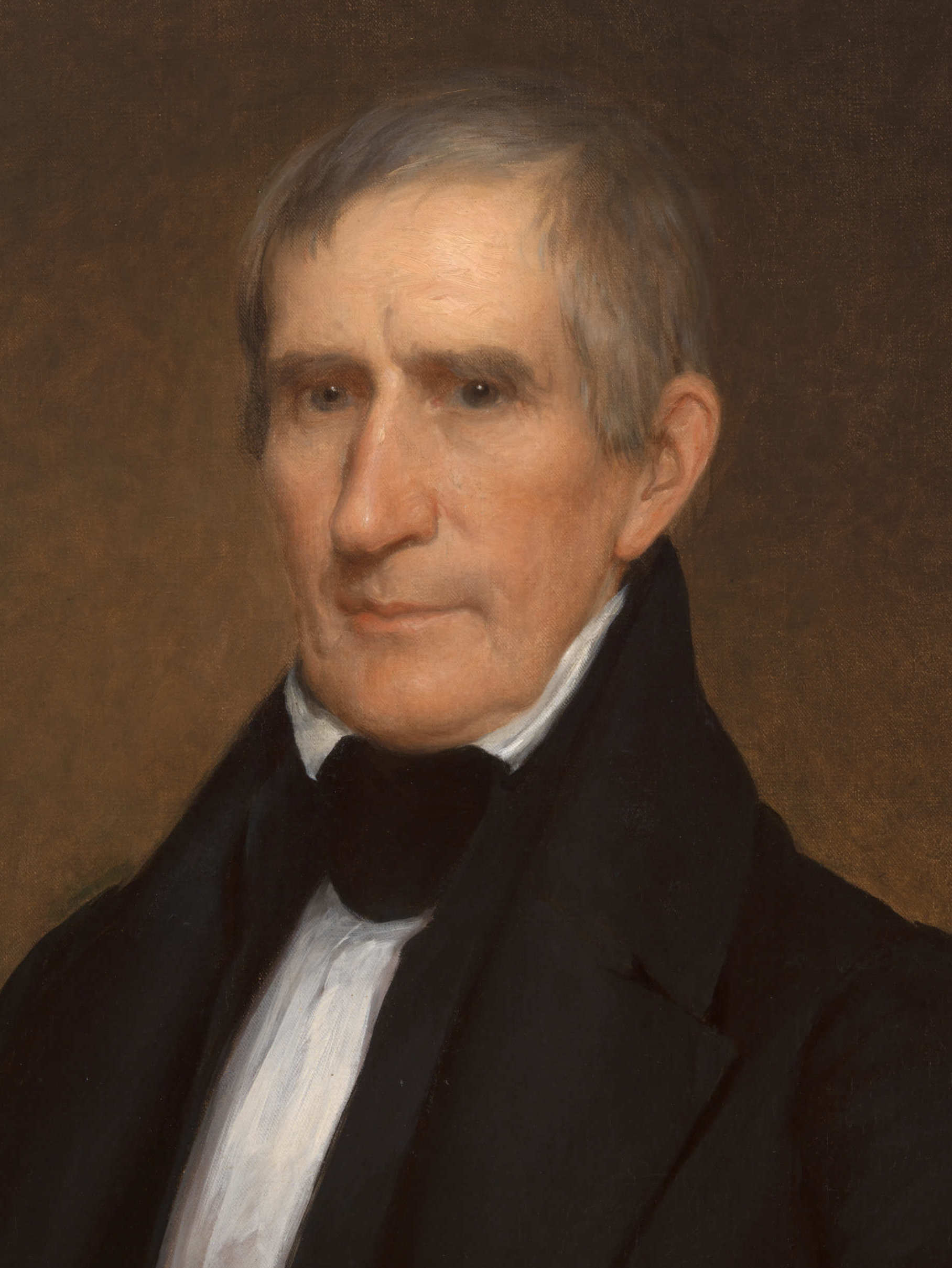

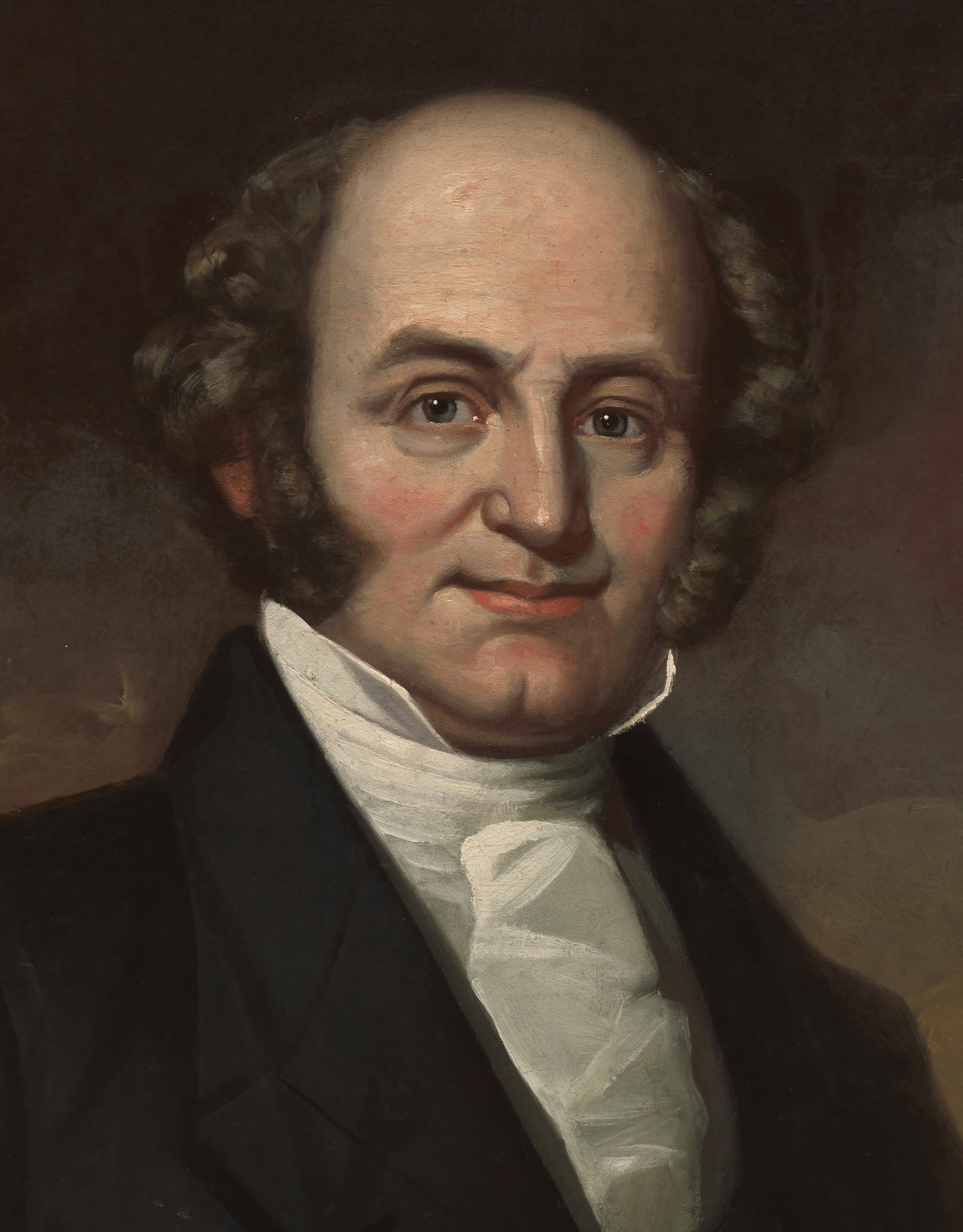
Nominee	William Henry Harrison	Martin Van Buren
Party	Whig	Democratic
Home state	Ohio	New York
Running mate	John Tyler	none
Electoral vote	10	0
Popular vote	46,612	46,190
Percentage	50.23%	49.77%
County results
Harrison
50–60%
60–70%
Van Buren
50–60%
60–70%
President before election
Martin Van Buren
Democratic
Elected President
William Henry Harrison
Whig

A presidential election was held in Maine on November 2, 1840 as part of the 1840 United States presidential election. Voters chose ten representatives, or electors to the Electoral College, who voted for president and vice president.

Maine voted for the Whig candidate, William Henry Harrison, over Democratic candidate Martin Van Buren. Harrison won the state by a very narrow margin of 0.46%.

Maine was typically a Democratic state during the Second Party System, however, with Harrison narrowly winning the state, this would be the only time that a Whig presidential candidate would win Maine.

== Results ==
1840 United States presidential election in Maine
Party	Candidate	Running mate	Popular vote		Electoral vote	
Party	Candidate	Running mate	Count	%	Count	%
Whig	William Henry Harrison of Ohio	John Tyler of Virginia	46,612	50.23%	10	100.00%
Democratic	Martin Van Buren of New York	Richard Mentor Johnson of Kentucky	46,190	49.77%	0	0.00%
Total			92,802	100.00%	10	100.00%

== See also ==
- United States presidential elections in Maine
