= 1848 United States presidential election in Maine =

- November 7, 1848
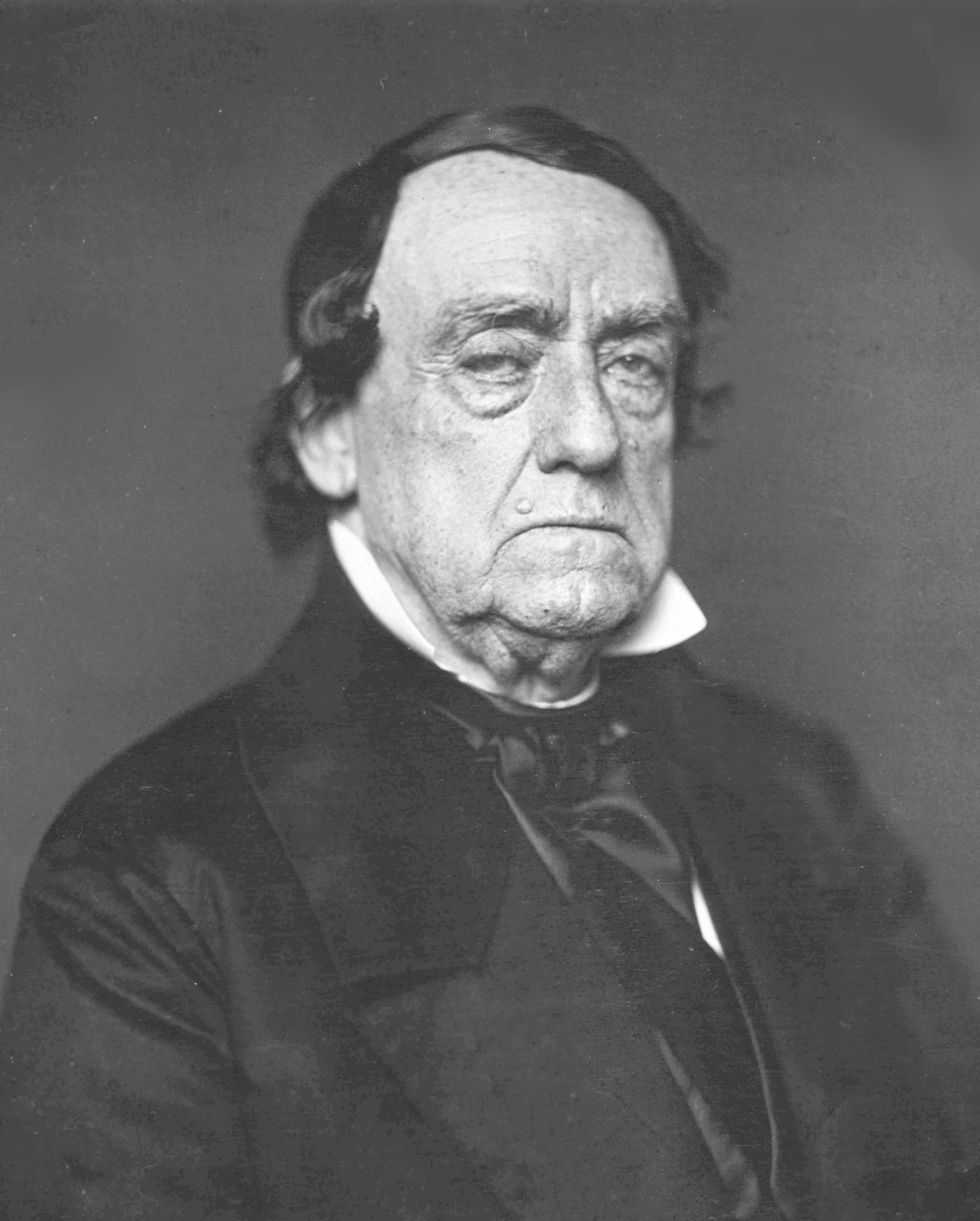

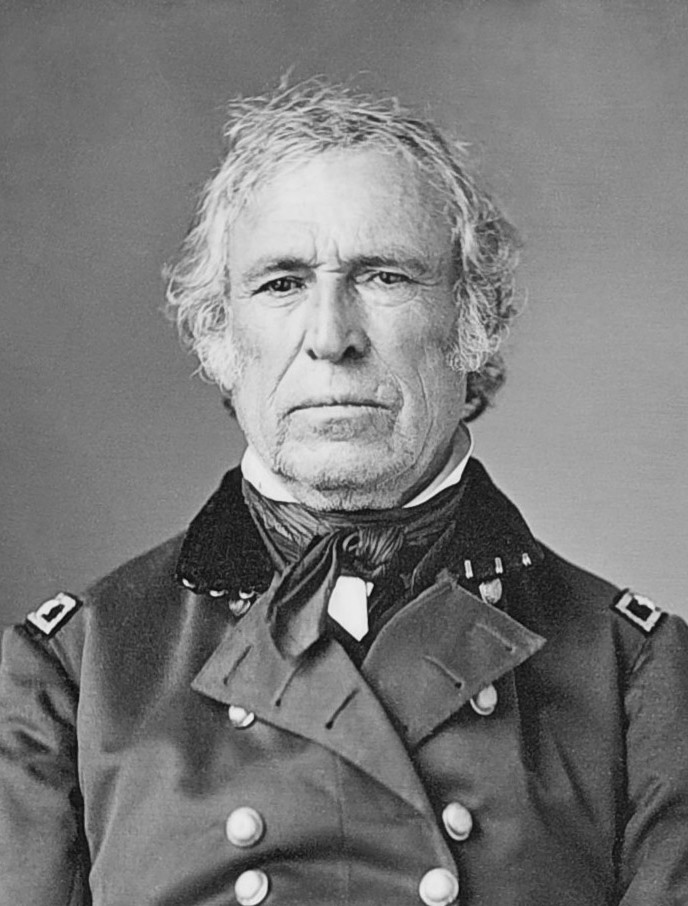

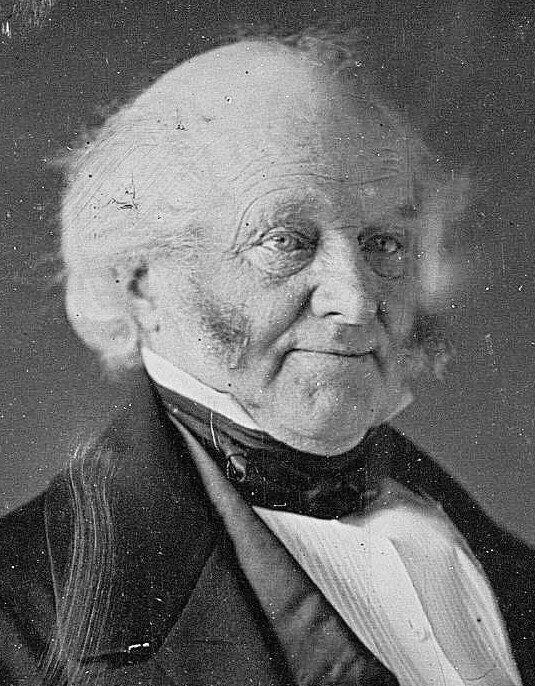
Nominee	Lewis Cass	Zachary Taylor	Martin Van Buren
Party	Democratic	Whig	Free Soil
Home state	Michigan	Louisiana	New York
Running mate	William O. Butler	Millard Fillmore	Charles Francis Adams Sr.
Electoral vote	9	0	0
Popular vote	40,195	35,273	12,157
Percentage	45.87%	40.25%	13.87%
County results
Cass
40–50%
50–60%
60–70%
Taylor
40–50%
50–60%
President before election
James K. Polk
Democratic
Elected President
Zachary Taylor
Whig

The 1848 United States presidential election in Maine took place on November 7, 1848, as part of the 1848 United States presidential election. Voters chose nine representatives, or electors to the Electoral College, who voted for President and Vice President.

Maine voted for the Democratic candidate, Lewis Cass, over Whig candidate Zachary Taylor and Free Soil candidate Martin Van Buren. Cass won Maine by a margin of 5.62% over Taylor. This was the last time until 1968 that Maine would back a losing Democrat in a presidential election.

== Results ==
1848 United States presidential election in Maine
Party	Candidate	Running mate	Popular vote		Electoral vote	
Party	Candidate	Running mate	Count	%	Count	%
Democratic	Lewis Cass of Michigan	William O. Butler of Kentucky	40,195	45.87%	9	100.00%
Whig	Zachary Taylor of Louisiana	Millard Fillmore of New York	35,273	40.25%	0	0.00%
Free Soil	Martin Van Buren of New York	Charles Francis Adams Sr. of Massachusetts	12,157	13.87%	0	0.00%
Total			87,625	100.00%	9	100.00%

== See also ==
- United States presidential elections in Maine
