= 1864 United States presidential election in Maine =

- November 8, 1864

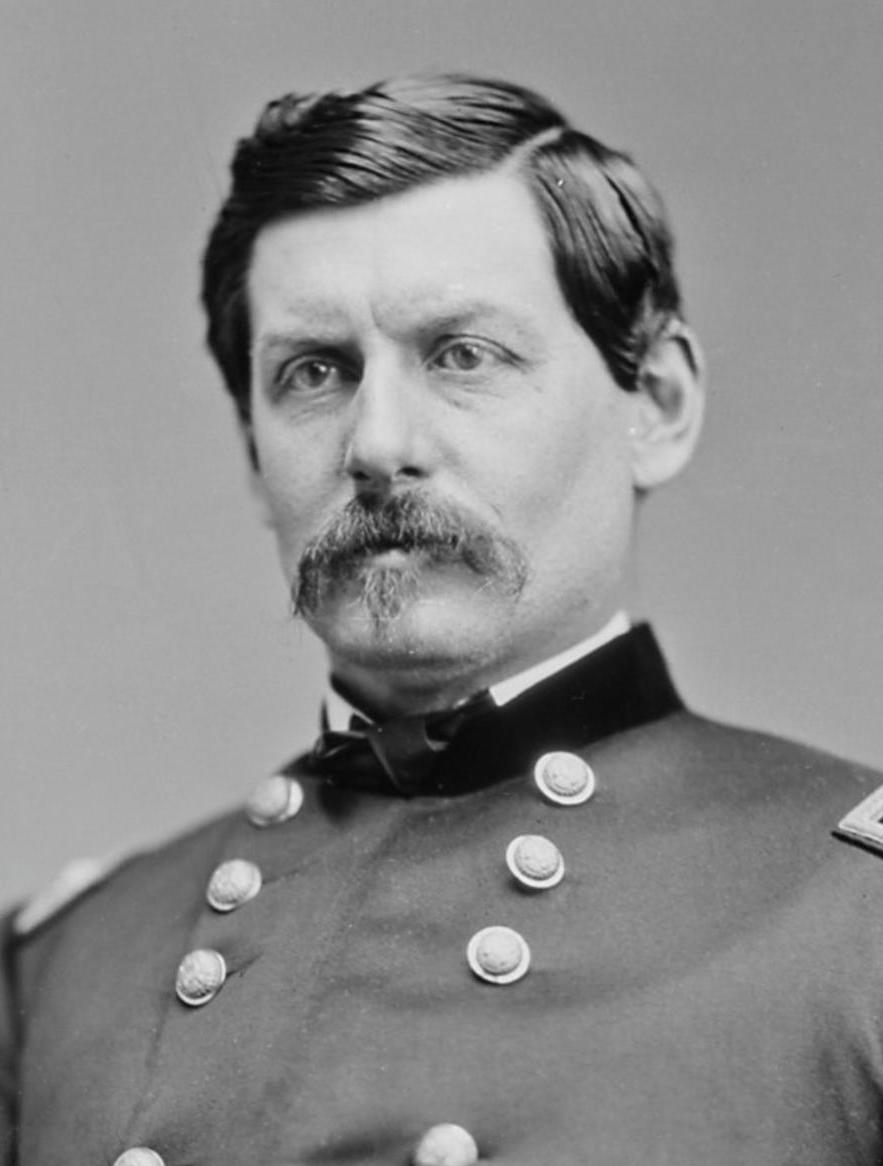
Nominee	Abraham Lincoln	George B. McClellan
Party	National Union	Democratic
Home state	Illinois	New Jersey
Running mate	Andrew Johnson	George H. Pendleton
Electoral vote	7	0
Popular vote	67,805	46,992
Percentage	59.07%	40.93%
County results
Lincoln
50–60%
60–70%
70–80%
McClellan
50–60%
President before election
Abraham Lincoln
Republican
Elected President
Abraham Lincoln
National Union

The 1864 United States presidential election in Maine took place on November 8, 1864, as part of the 1864 United States presidential election. Voters chose seven representatives, or electors to the Electoral College, who voted for president and vice president.

Maine voted for the National Union candidate, incumbent Republican President Abraham Lincoln and his running mate Andrew Johnson. They defeated the Democratic candidate, George B. McClellan and his running mate George H. Pendleton. Lincoln won the state by a margin of 18.14%.

== Results ==
1864 United States presidential election in Maine
Party	Candidate	Votes	Percentage	Electoral votes
National Union	Abraham Lincoln (incumbent)	67,805	59.07%	7
Democratic	George B. McClellan	46,992	40.93%	0
Totals		114,797	100.0%	7

== See also ==
- United States presidential elections in Maine
