= 1868 United States presidential election in Maine =

- November 3, 1868
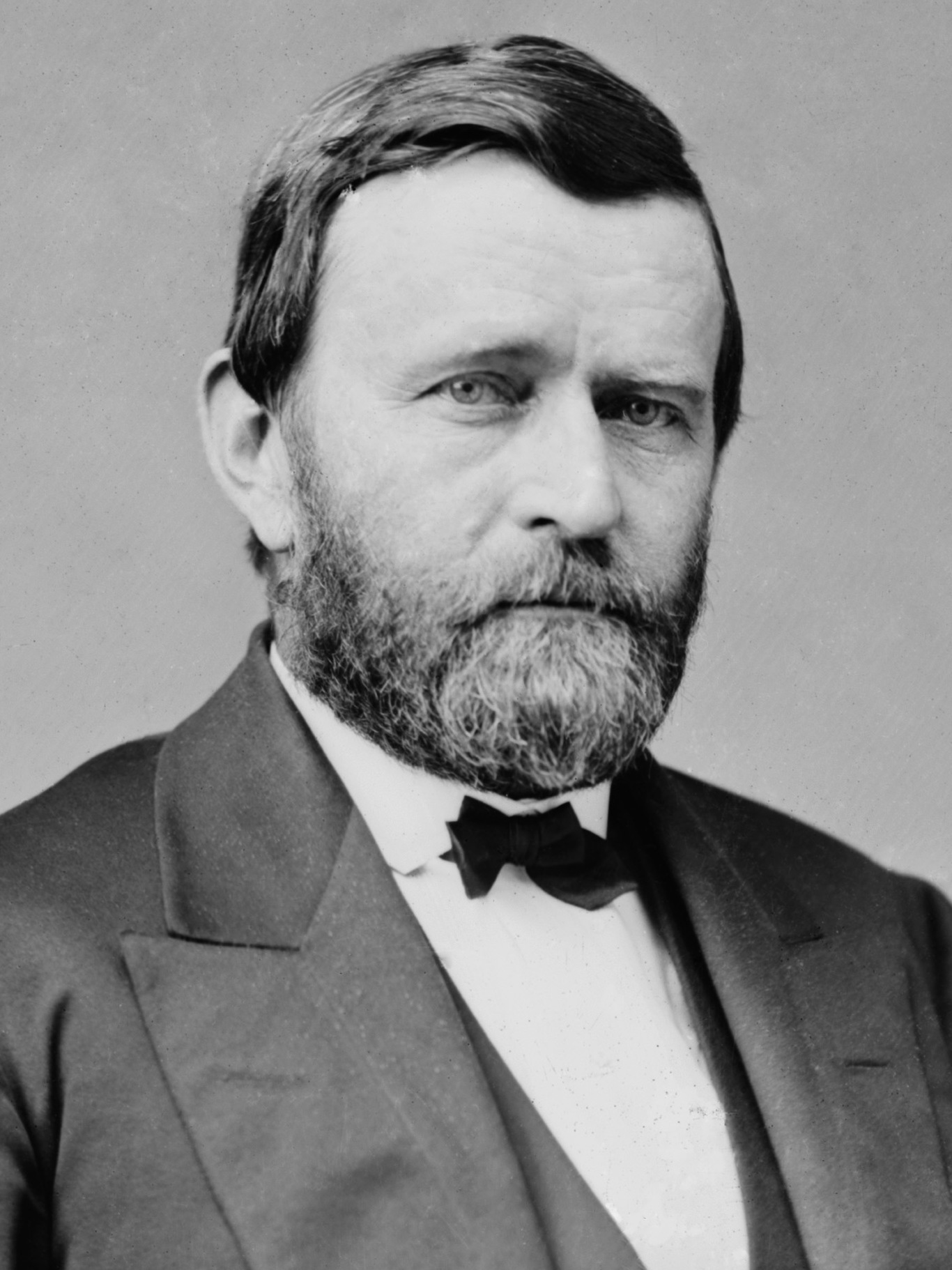

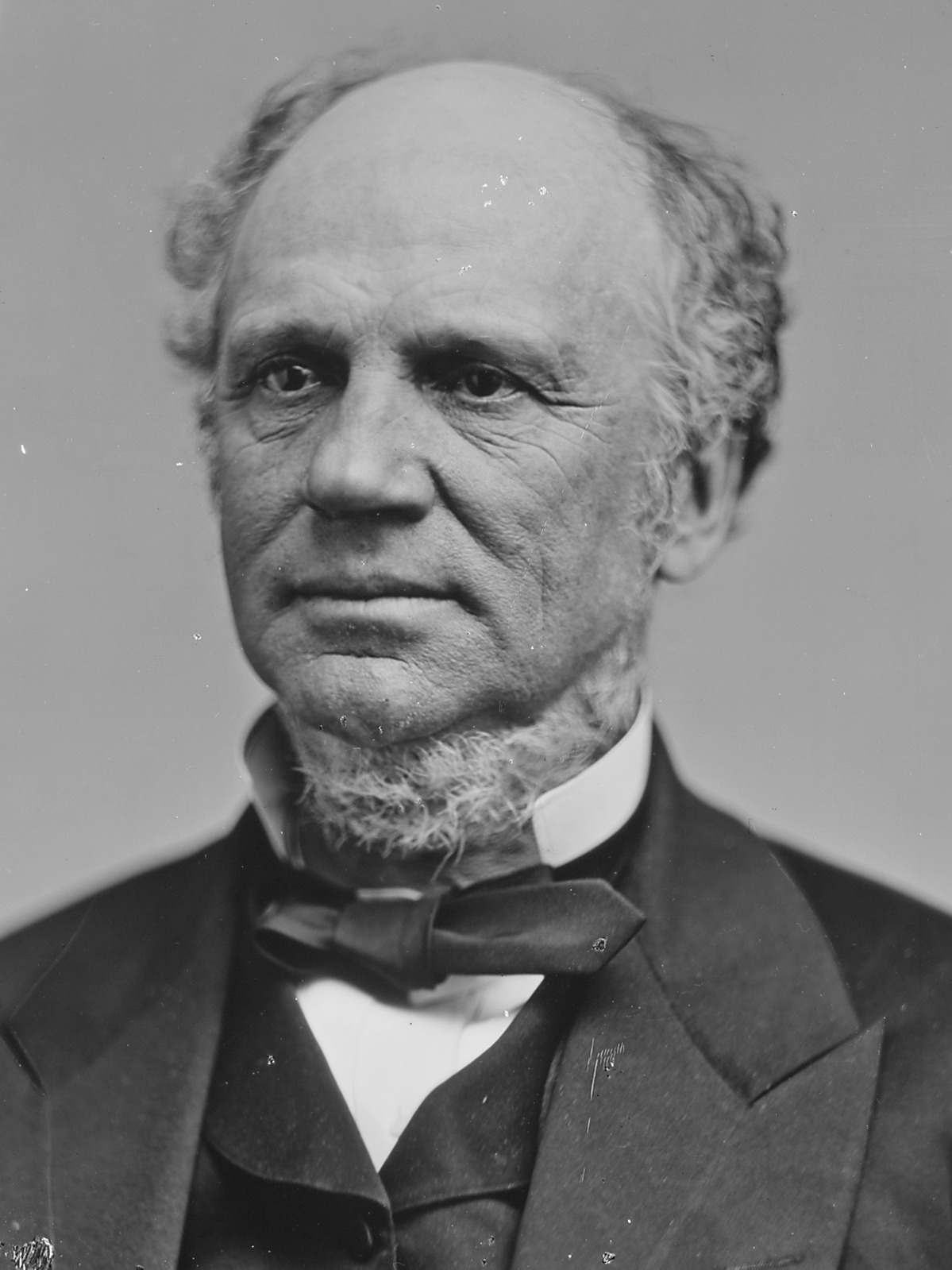
Nominee	Ulysses S. Grant	Horatio Seymour
Party	Republican	Democratic
Home state	Illinois	New York
Running mate	Schuyler Colfax	Francis Preston Blair Jr.
Electoral vote	7	0
Popular vote	70,502	42,460
Percentage	62.41%	37.59%
County results
Grant
50–60%
60–70%
70–80%
President before election
Andrew Johnson
Democratic
Elected President
Ulysses S. Grant
Republican

The 1868 United States presidential election in Maine took place on November 3, 1868, as part of the 1868 United States presidential election. Voters chose seven representatives, or electors to the Electoral College, who voted for president and vice president.

Maine voted for the Republican nominee, Ulysses S. Grant, over the Democratic nominee, Horatio Seymour. Grant won the state by a margin of 24.82%.

== Results ==
1868 United States presidential election in Maine
Party	Candidate	Running mate	Popular vote		Electoral vote	
Party	Candidate	Running mate	Count	%	Count	%
Republican	Ulysses S. Grant of Illinois	Schuyler Colfax of Indiana	70,502	62.41%	7	100.00%
Democratic	Horatio Seymour of New York	Francis Preston Blair Jr. of Missouri	42,460	37.59%	0	0.00%
Total			112,962	100.00%	7	100.00%

== See also ==
- United States presidential elections in Maine
