= John Hancock Warehouse =

- U.S. National Register of Historic Places
- U.S. Historic district – Contributing property
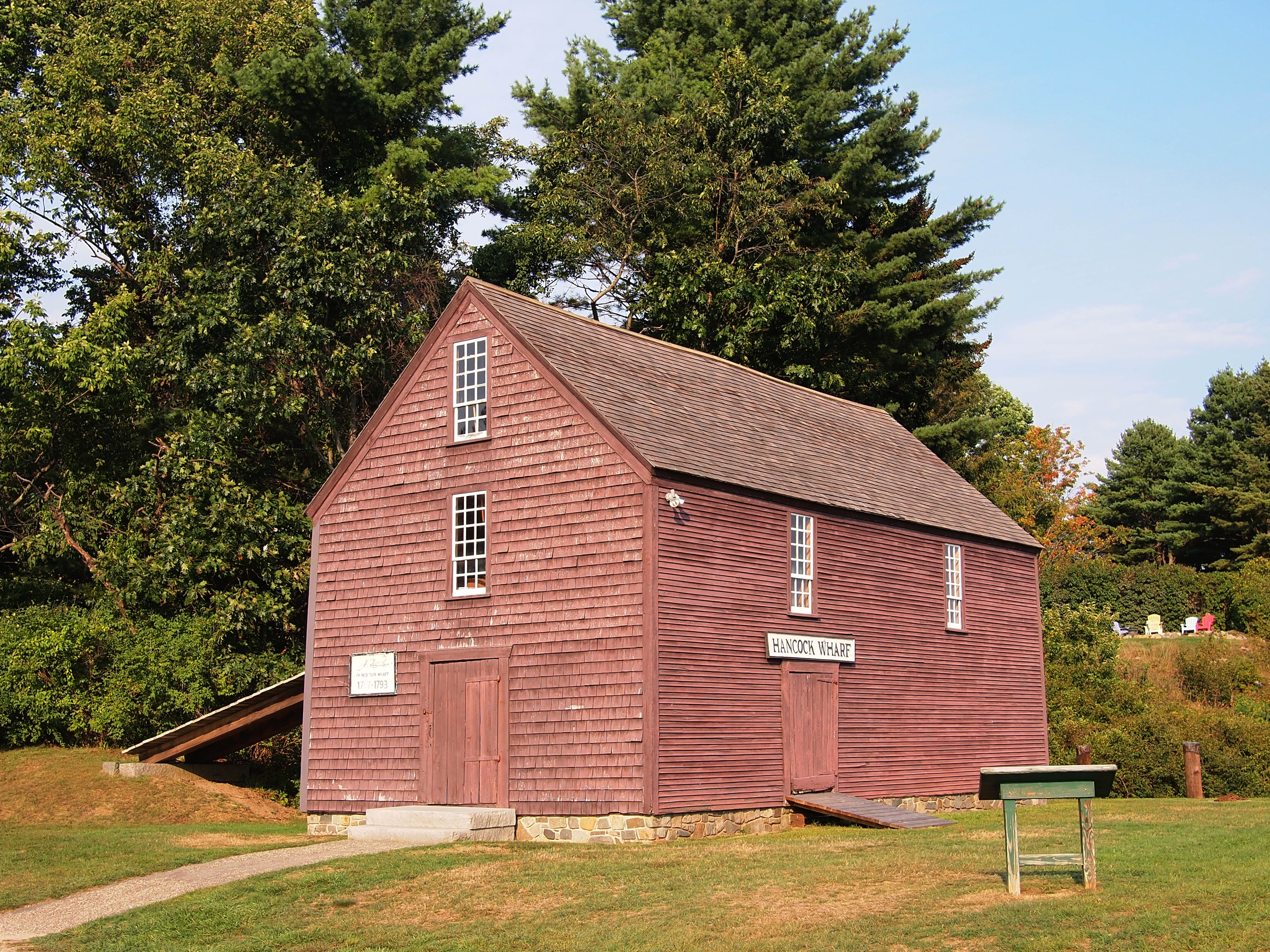

- Location within Maine Location within the United States
- Location: Lindsay Road, York, Maine
- Coordinates: 43°8′12″N 70°39′28″W
- Area: 0 acres (0 ha)
- Part of: York Historic District (ID73000249)
- NRHP reference No.: 69000029

Significant dates
- Added to NRHP: December 2, 1969
- Designated CP: July 16, 1973

The John Hancock Warehouse is a historic warehouse at 136 Lindsay Street in York, Maine. Built in the 18th century, the small warehouse is notable for its association with Massachusetts politician John Hancock. It is the oldest known commercial structure in the state of Maine. The building was added to the National Register of Historic Places on December 2, 1969. It is now a museum property owned by Museums of Old York.

== Description and history ==
The Hancock Warehouse is located south of Lindsay Road on the north bank of the York River, a short way east of the Sewall Bridge, which carries Seabury Road across the river. It is a rectangular 2 1/2-story wood-frame structure measuring about 26 by 24 feet (7.9 m × 7.3 m), and is about 40 feet (12 m) tall. It has a gable roof and is finished in shingle siding. The interior is rough-hewn timber construction joined by mortise and tenon joints with wooden peg fasteners. Its second floor is accessible either via an inside stairway or an exterior ramp. There is a wheel (in working order) to facilitate the movement of goods between floors.

The warehouse was built in the mid-18th century, and was by the late 1760s owned in part, along with the adjacent wharf and a store, by John Hancock as part of a large merchant empire that included warehouses up and down the Maine coast. Due to his partnership with Joseph Tucker, it is unclear if Hancock ever saw the property himself; he may have visited it in 1791 when he came to York to visit the former Loyalist and longtime friend Jonathan Sayward at his nearby house. When Hancock died, his heirs sold his interest to Tucker.

== See also ==
- National Register of Historic Places listings in York County, Maine
