= Robert Rose Tavern =

Historic house in Maine, United States

- U.S. National Register of Historic Places
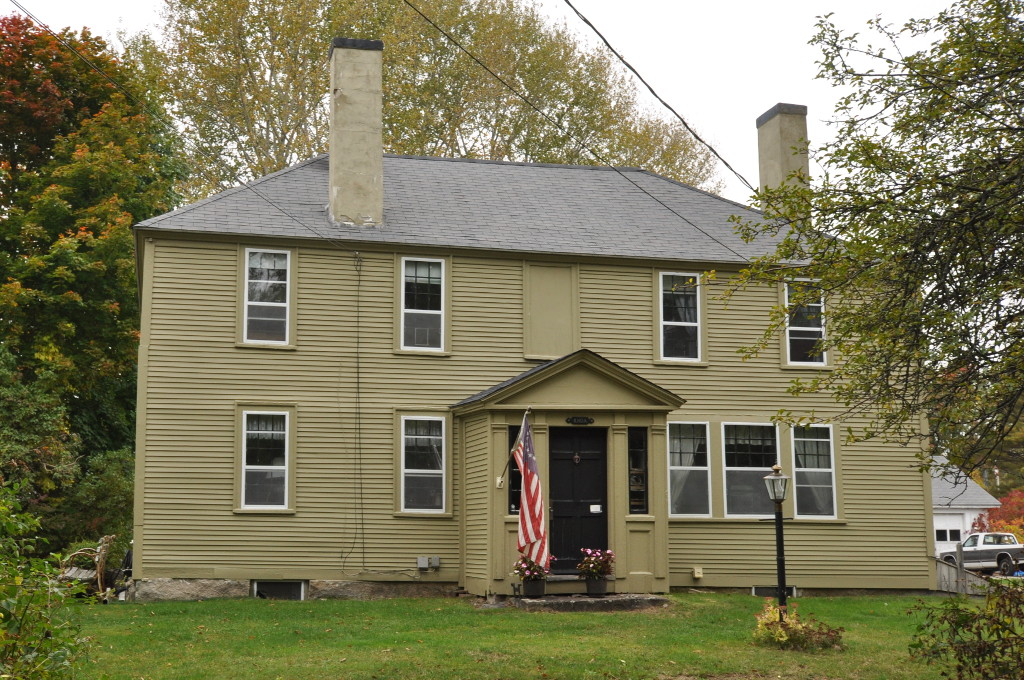

- Location within Maine Location within the United States
- Location: 298 Long Sands Rd., York, Maine
- Coordinates: 43°9′12.7″N 70°37′39.5″W
- Area: 2 acres (0.81 ha)
- Built: 1680
- Architectural style: Colonial, Federal
- NRHP reference No.: 75000206
- Added to NRHP: October 10, 1975

The Robert Rose Tavern is a historic house and former tavern at 298 Long Sands Road in York, Maine. Built in the 1750s using elements of a house built in 1680, it is one of the oldest surviving public hostelries in the state. The original house was built by John Banks, one of York's early settlers, and the tavern was built by a prominent local businessman. Now a private residence, the house was listed on the National Register of Historic Places in 1975.

== Description and history ==
The Rose Tavern is located at the end of a long private drive off Long Sands Road, which runs just east of, and parallel to, the main access road to York High School. It is a two-story L-shaped wood-frame structure, with a hip roof, clapboard siding, and granite foundation. Its main facade, which faces east, is roughly symmetrical, five bays wide, with a center entrance set in an enclosed projecting gabled vestibule. The door is flanked by sidelight windows, which are separated from the door and the vestibule corners by pilasters. To the right of the door, instead of a pair of sash windows (as found to its left) there are a group of three modern replacement sash windows. The interior of the building follows a central hall plan, with the original staircase still in place, along with late Georgian and Federal period woodwork elsewhere.

The property on which the tavern stands was granted to John Banks, the son of Richard Banks who settled in York in 1642. Banks, born in York in 1657, built his house in 1680. Banks and his house survived the 1692 Candlemas Massacre, in which his father and two brothers perished, probably because it was set well back from the beach. In 1756 Robert Rose purchased the Banks property, and built the present house as a major expansion of Banks' 1680 house, leaving little more than parts of the frame and foundation as recognizably 17th-century in origin. Rose operated the tavern until 1782, and was active in local civic affairs, hosting meetings of the town selectmen. He supplemented his income by working as the keeper of the local jail.

== See also ==
- National Register of Historic Places listings in York County, Maine
