= Windol Weaver =

American politician

Member of the Maine House of Representatives for the 150th District
- In office December 2006 – December 2014
- Preceded by: David Ott
- Succeeded by: Lydia Blume

Personal details
- Party: Republican
- Education: Texas A&M University
- Profession: Retired Air Force officer

Windol C. Weaver is an American politician from Maine. In 2006, Weaver, a Republican, was elected to the Maine House of Representatives from District 150, which included his residence in York, Maine. He was subsequently re-elected in 2008, 2010 and 2012. In 2010, Weaver was appointed chair of the Maine Joint Committee Marine Resources. He was unable to seek re-election in 2014 due to term-limits.

== Personal ==
Weaver graduated from Waco High School in 1959. He attended Texas A&M University and served four tours in Vietnam from 1967 to 1970 and retired from his military career in 1987 as a lieutenant colonel. He and his family moved to York, Maine in 1980 and subsequently became involved in town and county government.
