= York Historic District (York, Maine) =

Historic district in Maine, United States

- U.S. National Register of Historic Places
- U.S. Historic district
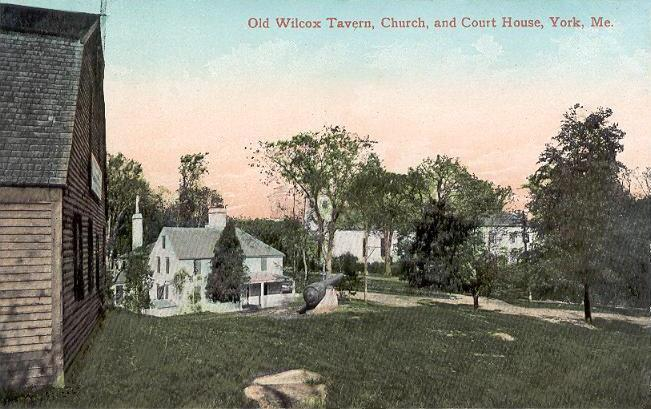
- Village view c. 1908

- Location within Maine Location within the United States
- Location: Roughly U.S. 1, U.S. 1A, ME 103 and Woodbridge Rd., York, Maine
- Coordinates: 43°8′18″N 70°39′3″W
- Area: 1,700 acres (690 ha)
- Built: 1622
- Architect: Blaisdell, E.B.; Ross, Donald
- Architectural style: Bungalow/Craftsman
- NRHP reference No.: 73000249
- Added to NRHP: July 16, 1973

The York Historic District encompasses the historic village center of York, Maine, one of the oldest communities in the state. The expansive 1,700-acre (690 ha) district includes the oldest church in Maine, built by its oldest congregation in 1747, and the Old York Gaol, a National Historic Landmark that is one of the oldest public buildings in the United States. The district was listed on the National Register of Historic Places in 1973.

== Description and history ==
The town of York was established about 1630 as "Agamenticus", and was part of an effort by Sir Ferdinando Gorges to establish a dominant colony in New England. Gorges' dreams were not realized, and Agamenticus, along with the rest of Gorges' territory, became part of the Massachusetts Bay Colony in the 1650s. Agamenticus was renamed York, and became the county seat of York County, Massachusetts. Its central village grew on the northern bank of the York River, remaining small until the second decade of the 18th century, when the threat of further French and Indian Wars began to subside in the region. The oldest portion of the Old York Gaol was built in 1719, as was the Benjamin Stone Tavern on York Street. The First Parish Church, which stands on York Street in the village center near the Old Gaol, was built in 1747 for the first established church congregation in the state. The York Harbor area located southeast of the village center (and included in this district) developed in the 18th and 19th century as a shipping and shipbuilding center, and the York Corner area, near United States Route 1, developed as a service area for inland travelers and farmers.

The district is roughly bounded to the northeast by a line extending from US Route 1 to US Route 1A near its junction with Roaring Rock Road, and on the east by a line extending south from there to the mouth of the York River. The southern boundary extends westward, on the south side of the river, to Bartlett Road, with its western boundary extending north from their to the starting point. This area includes the traditional centers of York Village, York Harbor, and York Corner, along with the water-based resources of the York River that influenced the community's growth.

== See also ==
- National Register of Historic Places listings in York County, Maine
