= Sayward-Wheeler House =

Coordinates: 43°08′10″N 70°38′49″W

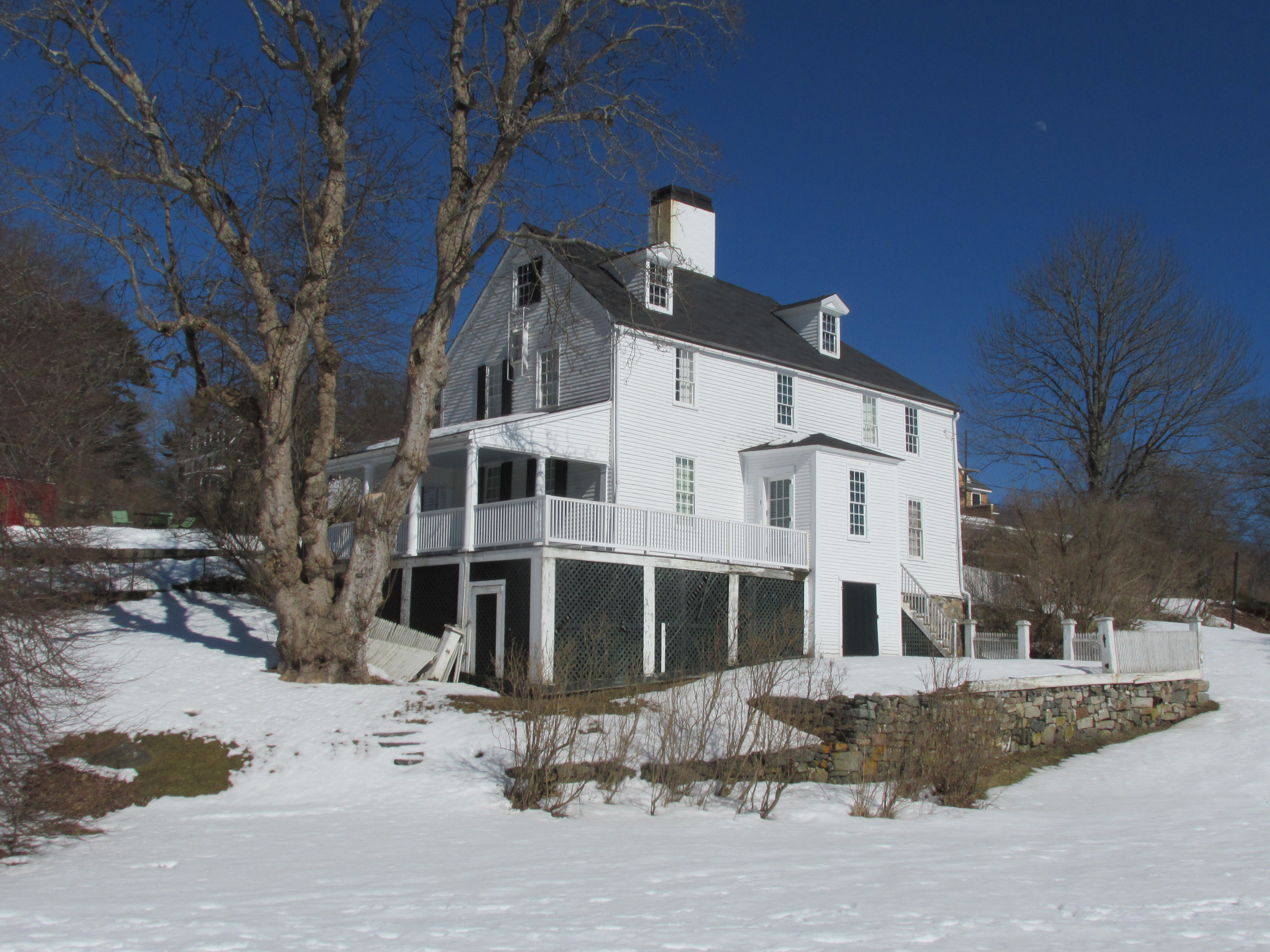
Sayward-Wheeler House

The Sayward-Wheeler House is an American historic house museum in York Harbor, Maine. It was built about 1718, and overlooks the York River. it was the home of Jonathan Sayward, a local merchant and civic leader, who remodeled and furnished the house in the 1760s according to his own conservative taste.,

Sayward participated in the 1745 siege of the French fortress at Louisbourg, Nova Scotia, served in the Massachusetts legislature, and, despite outspoken Tory views, retained the respect of his neighbors during the American Revolution.

After his death, his heirs made few changes to the house. In part, this was due to the depressed economy following Thomas Jefferson's trade embargo of 1807, but the family's reverence for its founding patriarch was an equally important factor in preservation. As early as the 1860s, Sayward's descendants opened the house to visitors to show how their forebears had lived in bygone colonial days.

In the early 20th century, the house was refurbished for use as a summer residence, with new wallpaper and white-painted woodwork, but the original furnishings and family portraits remained in place. Today, the house is owned and operated as a historic house museum by Historic New England.
