= York County, Maine =

County in Maine, United States

- County
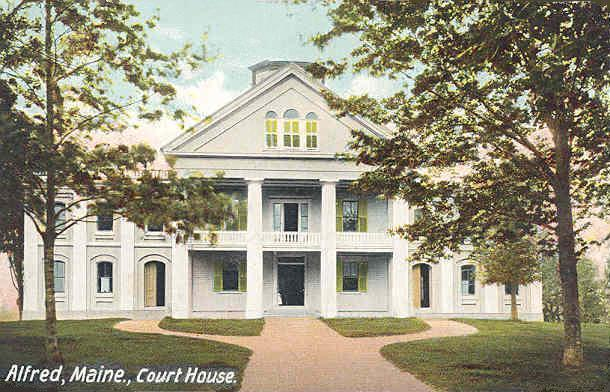
- York County Courthouse in Alfred

- Flag Seal

- Location within the U.S. state of Maine
- Coordinates: 43°26′45″N 70°39′48″W
- Country: United States
- State: Maine
- Founded: 1636
- Named for: York, England
- Seat: Alfred
- Largest city: Biddeford

Area
  - Total: 1,270 sq mi (3,300 km^{2})
  - Land: 991 sq mi (2,570 km^{2})
  - Water: 279 sq mi (720 km^{2}) 22%

Population (2020)
  - Total: 211,972
  - Estimate (2025): 222,434 ▲
  - Density: 214/sq mi (82.6/km^{2})
- Time zone: UTC−5 (Eastern)
  - Summer (DST): UTC−4 (EDT)
- Congressional district: 1st
- Website: yorkcountymaine.gov

York County is the southernmost county in the U.S. state of Maine, along the state of New Hampshire's eastern border. It is divided from Strafford County, New Hampshire, by the Salmon Falls River and the connected tidal estuary, the Piscataqua River. York County was permanently established in 1636. Several of Maine's earliest colonial settlements are found in the county, which is the state's oldest and one of the oldest in the United States. As of the 2020 census, its population was 211,972, making it Maine's second-most populous county. Its county seat is Alfred. York County is part of the Portland-South Portland-Biddeford metropolitan area.

== History ==
=== 1622 patent ===
The first patent establishing the Province of Maine was granted on August 10, 1622, to Ferdinando Gorges and John Mason by the Plymouth Council for New England, which itself had been granted a royal patent by James I to the coast of North America between the 40th and the 48th parallels "from sea to sea". This first patent encompassed the coast between the Merrimack and Kennebec rivers, as well as an irregular parcel of land between the headwaters of the two rivers. In 1629, Gorges and Mason agreed to split the patent at the Piscataqua River, with Mason retaining the land south of the river as the Province of New Hampshire.

Gorges named his more northerly piece of territory New Somersetshire. This venture failed, however, because of lack of funds and colonial settlement. Also failed was a venture by Capt. Christopher Levett, an agent for Gorges and a member of the Council for New England. With the King's blessing, Levett embarked on a scheme to found a colony on the site of present-day Portland. Levett was granted 6,000 acres (24 km^{2}) of land, the first Englishman to own the soil of Portland. There he proposed to found a settlement named York after the city of his birth in England. Ultimately, the project was abandoned, the men Levett left behind disappeared, and Levett died aboard ship on his return to England from the Massachusetts Bay Colony in 1630. One part of Levett's scheme did survive: the name of York, which now adorns the county.

The now-decommissioned Fort Levett on Cushing Island in Casco Bay is named for Levett.

=== Formation of Yorkshire County in 1636 ===
Gorges obtained a renewed patent for the area between the Piscataqua and Kennebec Rivers, in the form of a royal charter from Charles I of England. The area was roughly the same as that covered in the 1622 patent after the 1629 split with Mason. The second colony also foundered for lack of money and settlers, although it survived the death of Gorges in 1647.

=== Absorption by Massachusetts ===
In the 1650s the nearby Massachusetts Bay Colony asserted territorial claims over what is now southern Maine, and by 1658 had completely absorbed what is now southwestern Maine into York County, Massachusetts.

The first known and recorded offer for a purchase of land in Yorkshire County is in 1668, when Francis Small traded goods with the Newichewannock tribe of this area. Their Chief Wesumbe, also known as Captain Sandy, was friendly with Small and warned him of a plot against his life. A group of renegade tribesmen planned on murdering Small instead of paying him with the furs that were owed to him. Small escaped after watching his house in what is now Cornish, Maine, burn to the ground. Small returned and rebuilt. The Chief made up the loss by selling Small all the lands bounded by the Great and Little Ossipee Rivers, the Saco River, and the New Hampshire border. Known now as the five Ossipee towns, the tract included all of Limington, Limerick, Cornish (formerly named Francisborough), Newfield and Parsonsfield. Yorkshire County saw several of its towns destroyed by Wabanaki Indians and their French allies during King William's War in the 1690s.

The large size of the county led to its division in 1760, with Cumberland and Lincoln counties carved out of its eastern portions. When Massachusetts adopted its state government in 1780, it created the District of Maine to manage its eastern territories. In 1805 the northern portion of York County was separated to form part of Oxford County. When Maine achieved statehood in 1820 all of the counties of the District of Maine became counties of Maine.

== Geography ==
According to the U.S. Census Bureau, the county has a total area of 1,270 square miles (3,300 km^{2}), of which 991 square miles (2,570 km^{2}) is land and 279 square miles (720 km^{2}) (22%) is water.

Community high points
| Mountain name | Elevation (feet) | Community |
|---|---|---|
| Clark Mountain | 1,320 | Cornish |
| Wiggin Mountain | 1,300 | Parsonsfield |
| Sawyer Mountain, main summit | 1,200 | Limington |
| Sawyer Mountain, north summit | 1,200 | Limerick |
| Province Mountain | 1,176 | Newfield |
| Fort Ridge, main summit | 1,114 | Shapleigh |
| Ossipee Hill | 1,058 | Waterboro |
| Hussey Hill | 1,051 | Acton |
| Fort Ridge, south slope | 1,000 | Alfred |
| Prospect Hill | 880 | Lebanon |
| Bauneg Beg Hill | 866 | North Berwick |
| Mount Agamenticus | 692 | York |
| Mount Hope | 680 | Sanford |
| Whitehouse Hill | 581 | Hollis |
| Grant Hill | 502 | Lyman |
| No name (hill) | 385 | Buxton |
| Welch Hill | 370 | South Berwick |
| No name (hill) | 360 | Wells |
| Clark Hill | 360 | Dayton |
| Third Hill | 360 | Eliot |
| No name (hill) | 300 | Biddeford |
| No name (hill) | 240 | Arundel |
| No name (hill) | 230 | Saco |
| No name (hill) | 223 | Kennebunk |
| 6 unnamed locations | 200 | Kennebunkport |
| 5 unnamed locations | 160 | Ogunquit |
| Cutts Ridge | 140 | Kittery |
| No name (hill) | 138 | Old Orchard Beach |

=== Adjacent counties ===
- Oxford County – north
- Cumberland County – northeast
- Rockingham County, New Hampshire – southwest
- Strafford County, New Hampshire – west
- Carroll County, New Hampshire – northwest

=== National protected area ===
- Rachel Carson National Wildlife Refuge (part)

== Demographics ==
Historical population
| Census | Pop. | Note | %± |
|---|---|---|---|
| 1790 | 29,078 | | — |
| 1800 | 37,896 | | 30.3% |
| 1810 | 41,877 | | 10.5% |
| 1820 | 46,283 | | 10.5% |
| 1830 | 51,722 | | 11.8% |
| 1840 | 54,034 | | 4.5% |
| 1850 | 60,098 | | 11.2% |
| 1860 | 62,107 | | 3.3% |
| 1870 | 60,174 | | −3.1% |
| 1880 | 62,257 | | 3.5% |
| 1890 | 62,829 | | 0.9% |
| 1900 | 64,885 | | 3.3% |
| 1910 | 68,526 | | 5.6% |
| 1920 | 70,696 | | 3.2% |
| 1930 | 72,934 | | 3.2% |
| 1940 | 82,550 | | 13.2% |
| 1950 | 93,541 | | 13.3% |
| 1960 | 99,402 | | 6.3% |
| 1970 | 111,576 | | 12.2% |
| 1980 | 139,666 | | 25.2% |
| 1990 | 164,587 | | 17.8% |
| 2000 | 186,742 | | 13.5% |
| 2010 | 197,131 | | 5.6% |
| 2020 | 211,972 | | 7.5% |
| 2025 (est.) | 222,434 | ▲ | 4.9% |
U.S. Decennial Census; 1790–1960 1900–1990; 1990–2000 2010–2019

=== 2020 census ===
As of the 2020 census, the county had a population of 211,972. Of the residents, 18.2% were under the age of 18 and 21.4% were 65 years of age or older; the median age was 45.7 years. For every 100 females there were 95.4 males, and for every 100 females age 18 and over there were 93.5 males. 48.0% of residents lived in urban areas and 52.0% lived in rural areas.

The racial makeup of the county was 92.1% White, 1.0% Black or African American, 0.3% American Indian and Alaska Native, 1.2% Asian, 0.0% Native Hawaiian and Pacific Islander, 0.7% from some other race, and 4.6% from two or more races. Hispanic or Latino residents of any race comprised 1.9% of the population.

There were 88,924 households in the county, of which 24.6% had children under the age of 18 living with them and 24.4% had a female householder with no spouse or partner present. About 27.7% of all households were made up of individuals and 12.8% had someone living alone who was 65 years of age or older.

There were 112,198 housing units, of which 20.7% were vacant. Among occupied housing units, 74.0% were owner-occupied and 26.0% were renter-occupied. The homeowner vacancy rate was 1.1% and the rental vacancy rate was 6.2%.

York County, Maine – racial and ethnic composition Note: the US Census treats Hispanic/Latino as an ethnic category. This table excludes Latinos from the racial categories and assigns them to a separate category. Hispanics/Latinos may be of any race.
| Race / ethnicity (NH = Non-Hispanic) | Pop 2000 | Pop 2010 | Pop 2020 | % 2000 | % 2010 | % 2020 |
|---|---|---|---|---|---|---|
| White alone (NH) | 181,286 | 188,422 | 194,044 | 97.07% | 95.58% | 91.54% |
| Black or African American alone (NH) | 752 | 1,036 | 2,009 | 0.40% | 0.52% | 0.94% |
| Native American or Alaska Native alone (NH) | 434 | 540 | 566 | 0.23% | 0.27% | 0.26% |
| Asian alone (NH) | 1,361 | 2,088 | 2,502 | 0.72% | 1.05% | 1.18% |
| Pacific Islander alone (NH) | 51 | 32 | 58 | 0.02% | 0.01% | 0.02% |
| Other race alone (NH) | 104 | 104 | 681 | 0.05% | 0.05% | 0.32% |
| Mixed-race or multiracial (NH) | 1,453 | 2,431 | 8,015 | 0.77% | 1.23% | 3.78% |
| Hispanic or Latino (any race) | 1,301 | 2,478 | 4,097 | 0.69% | 1.25% | 1.93% |
| Total | 186,742 | 197,131 | 211,972 | 100.00% | 100.00% | 100.00% |

=== 2010 census ===
As of the 2010 United States census, there were 197,131 people, 81,009 households, and 53,136 families living in the county. The population density was 199.0 inhabitants per square mile (76.8/km^{2}). There were 105,773 housing units at an average density of 106.8 per square mile (41.2/km^{2}). The racial makeup of the county was 96.4% white, 1.1% Asian, 0.6% black or African American, 0.3% American Indian, 0.3% from other races, and 1.4% from two or more races. Those of Hispanic or Latino origin made up 1.3% of the population. In terms of ancestry, 22.3% were English, 19.3% were Irish, 9.8% were French Canadian, 8.1% were German, 7.9% were Italian, 5.8% were American, and 5.6% were Scottish.

Of the 81,009 households, 29.3% had children under the age of 18 living with them, 51.4% were married couples living together, 9.7% had a female householder with no husband present, 34.4% were non-families, and 26.5% of all households were made up of individuals. The average household size was 2.40 and the average family size was 2.89. The median age was 43.0 years.

The median income for a household in the county was $55,008 and the median income for a family was $65,077. Males had a median income of $47,117 versus $34,001 for females. The per capita income for the county was $27,137. About 5.6% of families and 8.5% of the population were below the poverty line, including 10.4% of those under age 18 and 8.1% of those age 65 or over.

=== 2000 census ===
At the 2000 census, there were 186,742 people, 74,563 households and 50,851 families living in the county. The population density was 188 inhabitants per square mile (73/km^{2}). There were 94,234 housing units at an average density of 95 per square mile (37/km^{2}). The racial makeup of the county was 97.56% White, 0.42% Black or African American, 0.24% Native American, 0.73% Asian, 0.03% Pacific Islander, 0.17% from other races, and 0.85% from two or more races. 0.70% of the population were Hispanic or Latino of any race. The most cited ethnicities were English (17.9%), French (14.5%), French Canadian (13.9%), Irish (12.5%), United States or American (9.6%) and Italian (5.1%). 90.84% of the population spoke English and 6.92% spoke French as their first language.

There were 74,563 households, of which 32.20% had children under the age of 18 living with them, 55.00% were married couples living together, 9.50% had a female householder with no husband present, and 31.80% were non-families. 24.90% of all households were made up of individuals, and 9.70% had someone living alone who was 65 years of age or older. The average household size was 2.47 and the average family size was 2.96.

Age distribution was 24.80% under the age of 18, 6.90% from 18 to 24, 30.00% from 25 to 44, 24.80% from 45 to 64, and 13.60% who were 65 years of age or older. For every 100 females, there were 94.50 males. For every 100 females age 18 and over, there were 91.40 males. The median age was 38 years.

The median household income was $43,630, and the median family income was $51,419. Males had a median income of $36,317 versus $26,016 for females. The per capita income for the county was $21,225. About 5.90% of families and 8.20% of the population were below the poverty line, including 9.90% of those under age 18 and 8.50% of those age 65 or over.

== Politics ==
Historically, York County was one of the more Democratic counties in Maine, a solid Republican state for much of the 19th and 20th centuries. York backed Democrat Woodrow Wilson in both 1912 and 1916, and voted for the Democratic nominee in each election from 1936 to 1948, even as the state as a whole backed the Republican in each of those elections. It was also one of only two counties in Maine to back Democrat John F. Kennedy in 1960 (Androscoggin was the other). Since 1952, it has voted for the statewide winner in each presidential election, except for 1960 and 1976 when Democrat Jimmy Carter won York County while the state as a whole voted for Republican Gerald Ford. Although home to the Bush family compound, it only supported the Bush family in one of its four presidential runs (that of George H. W. Bush in 1988). Democrat Joe Biden became the first candidate from any party to break 70,000 votes in the county, doing so in 2020.

At the same time, it had voted for Republican Senator Susan Collins in all of her reelection campaigns until 2026.

United States presidential election results for York County, Maine
| Year | Republican | | Democratic | | Third party(ies) | |
| Year | No. | % | No. | % | No. | % |
|---|---|---|---|---|---|---|
| 1880 | 7,700 | 51.23% | 7,090 | 47.18% | 239 | 1.59% |
| 1884 | 7,127 | 51.01% | 5,939 | 42.51% | 906 | 6.48% |
| 1888 | 7,255 | 55.20% | 5,576 | 42.43% | 311 | 2.37% |
| 1892 | 6,387 | 53.20% | 5,237 | 43.62% | 382 | 3.18% |
| 1896 | 7,532 | 66.44% | 3,456 | 30.49% | 348 | 3.07% |
| 1900 | 6,949 | 61.52% | 4,046 | 35.82% | 300 | 2.66% |
| 1904 | 7,096 | 68.41% | 2,866 | 27.63% | 411 | 3.96% |
| 1908 | 6,700 | 59.64% | 4,090 | 36.40% | 445 | 3.96% |
| 1912 | 3,960 | 30.25% | 5,121 | 39.12% | 4,008 | 30.62% |
| 1916 | 6,375 | 47.45% | 6,854 | 51.02% | 206 | 1.53% |
| 1920 | 13,536 | 65.77% | 6,852 | 33.29% | 192 | 0.93% |
| 1924 | 16,244 | 68.17% | 6,004 | 25.20% | 1,580 | 6.63% |
| 1928 | 18,671 | 64.78% | 10,030 | 34.80% | 119 | 0.41% |
| 1932 | 17,301 | 53.53% | 14,760 | 45.67% | 258 | 0.80% |
| 1936 | 17,827 | 48.09% | 18,017 | 48.60% | 1,226 | 3.31% |
| 1940 | 16,547 | 42.59% | 22,276 | 57.33% | 32 | 0.08% |
| 1944 | 18,122 | 45.82% | 21,386 | 54.08% | 39 | 0.10% |
| 1948 | 17,819 | 46.00% | 20,554 | 53.06% | 364 | 0.94% |
| 1952 | 27,045 | 56.74% | 20,524 | 43.06% | 95 | 0.20% |
| 1956 | 29,256 | 62.03% | 17,910 | 37.97% | 0 | 0.00% |
| 1960 | 25,763 | 49.60% | 26,171 | 50.39% | 3 | 0.01% |
| 1964 | 13,339 | 28.10% | 34,083 | 71.80% | 45 | 0.09% |
| 1968 | 18,931 | 38.91% | 28,817 | 59.23% | 904 | 1.86% |
| 1972 | 30,452 | 57.53% | 22,464 | 42.44% | 20 | 0.04% |
| 1976 | 27,380 | 44.95% | 31,996 | 52.52% | 1,540 | 2.53% |
| 1980 | 31,412 | 46.31% | 28,279 | 41.69% | 8,146 | 12.01% |
| 1984 | 43,554 | 60.43% | 28,241 | 39.19% | 275 | 0.38% |
| 1988 | 46,334 | 59.98% | 30,262 | 39.17% | 653 | 0.85% |
| 1992 | 32,241 | 34.09% | 35,507 | 37.55% | 26,815 | 28.36% |
| 1996 | 26,594 | 32.05% | 42,317 | 51.00% | 14,068 | 16.95% |
| 2000 | 42,304 | 44.74% | 46,618 | 49.31% | 5,628 | 5.95% |
| 2004 | 49,526 | 45.01% | 58,702 | 53.35% | 1,805 | 1.64% |
| 2008 | 42,389 | 38.83% | 64,799 | 59.36% | 1,973 | 1.81% |
| 2012 | 43,900 | 40.63% | 61,551 | 56.96% | 2,606 | 2.41% |
| 2016 | 50,403 | 44.11% | 55,844 | 48.87% | 8,027 | 7.02% |
| 2020 | 54,817 | 42.28% | 71,189 | 54.90% | 3,653 | 2.82% |
| 2024 | 58,194 | 43.81% | 72,114 | 54.29% | 2,530 | 1.90% |

=== Voter registration ===
Voter registration and party enrollment as of March 2024
| Democratic | 54,897 | 36.44% |
| Unenrolled | 47,915 | 31.81% |
| Republican | 41,260 | 27.39% |
| Green Independent | 4,736 | 3.14% |
| No Labels | 1,166 | 0.77% |
| Libertarian | 656 | 0.44% |
| Total | 150,630 | 100% |

== Communities ==
=== Cities ===
- Biddeford
- Saco
- Sanford

=== Towns ===
- Acton
- Alfred (county seat)
- Arundel
- Berwick
- Buxton
- Cornish
- Dayton
- Eliot
- Hollis
- Kennebunk
- Kennebunkport
- Kittery
- Lebanon
- Limerick
- Limington
- Lyman
- Newfield
- North Berwick
- Ogunquit
- Old Orchard Beach
- Parsonsfield
- Shapleigh
- South Berwick
- Waterboro
- Wells
- York

=== Census-designated places ===
- Alfred
- Berwick
- Cape Neddick
- Cornish
- Kennebunk
- Kennebunkport
- Kittery
- Kittery Point
- Lake Arrowhead
- North Berwick
- South Berwick
- South Eliot
- West Kennebunk
- York Harbor

=== Unincorporated villages or neighborhoods ===
- Bald Head
- Bar Mills
- Bedell Crossing
- Cape Porpoise
- East Parsonsfield
- East Waterboro
- Felch Corner
- Ocean Park
- Springvale
- York Beach
- York Cliffs

York County's most populous cities and towns at the 2010 US Census
| Biddeford (21,277) | Sanford (20,798) | Saco (18,482) | York (12,529) | Kennebunk (10,798) | Wells (9,589) | Kittery (9,490) |
| Old Orchard Beach (8,624) | Buxton (8,034) | Waterboro (7,693) | Berwick (7,246) | South Berwick (7,220) | Eliot (6,204) | Lebanon (6,031) |
| North Berwick (4,576) | Lyman (4,344) | Hollis (4,281) | Arundel (4,022) | Limington (3,713) | Kennebunkport (3,474) | Alfred (3,019) |
| Limerick (2,892) | Shapleigh (2,668) | Acton (2,447) | Dayton (1,965) | Parsonsfield (1,898) | Newfield (1,522) | Cornish (1,403) |
Ogunquit (892)

== Education ==
School districts are:

- Acton School District
- Biddeford School District
- Dayton Public Schools
- Kittery School District
- Saco Public Schools
- Sanford School District
- School Administrative District 35
- School Administrative District 06
- Wells-Ogunquit Community School District
- York School District
- School Administrative District 55
- School Administrative District 57
- School Administrative District 60
- Regional School Unit 21
- Regional School Unit 23

== See also ==
- History of Maine
- National Register of Historic Places listings in York County, Maine
- York County, Maine Tercentenary half dollar, 1936 commemorative coin
