= David Ott =

David Ott may refer to:

- David Ott (composer) (born 1947), American composer of classical music
- David E. Ott (1922–2004), officer in the United States Army
- David N. Ott (1937–2020), American politician and lawyer in Maine
