= John Sedgley Homestead =

Historic house in Maine, United States

- U.S. National Register of Historic Places
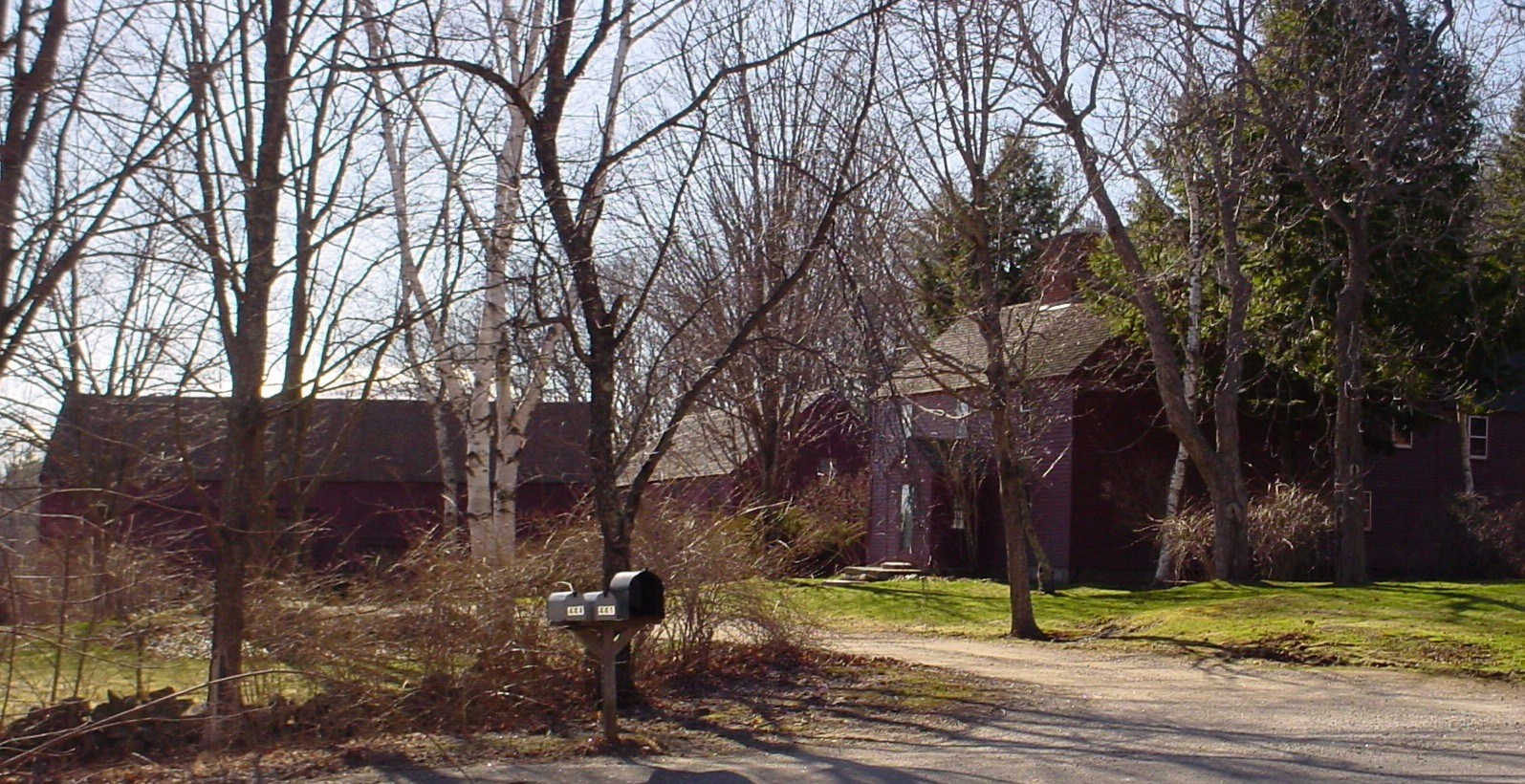

- Location within Maine Location within the United States
- Nearest city: York Corner, Maine
- Coordinates: 43°9′53″N 70°40′2″W
- Area: 3 acres (1.2 ha)
- Built: 1720
- Architect: Mr. John Sedgley
- Architectural style: Cape Cod Saltbox Style Capes
- NRHP reference No.: 76000192
- Added to NRHP: January 2, 1976

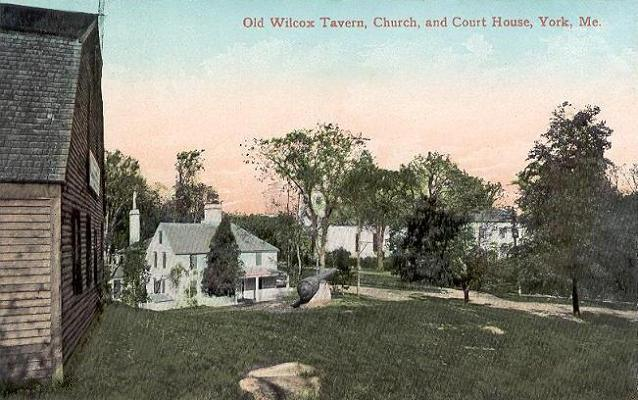
York Village in c. 1910

The John Sedgley Homestead is a historic homestead property at Scituate and Chases Pond Road in the York Corner area of York, Maine. Its oldest structure built in the late First Period, probably c. 1715, it is the oldest homestead in the State of Maine that is still in its original setting. Historically the homestead included a cape, farm home, carriage house, stables building, two outbuildings, and a large land holding, all of which is still existing today. The property was listed on the National Register of Historic Places in 1976.

== Jonathan Sedgley ==
Jonathan Sedgley was born in England between 1680 and 1690 and was a turner by trade. He came to York as a young man, and married in January 1714 to Miss Elizabeth Adams, the seventh child of Thomas and Hannah Adams, a prominent York family, cousins of President John Adams' family of Quincy, Massachusetts. Thomas Adams gave the plot of land upon which the homestead stands to the young couple in March 1715. Adams in January and December 1716 added two more lots to the Sedgley holdings and by middle life the latter, in addition to his trade as a turner had become a respected and prosperous landholder in York. Although not a leader in the community affairs himself, his son was elected Surveyor of Highways in 1775.

Since the Town of York, the second established town in Maine, and the first county seat in the state. It was almost completely wiped out by the great raid of the 1692 Abenaki Tribes. The John Sedgley Homestead presents one of the best and most substantial examples of the new settlement which was constructed and formed the foundation of the community of historic York on its frontier.

== Cape ==
The cape was built about 1715 by Jonathan Sedgley, which was the first year his wife and he started living on the land. The structure sits on a granite foundation and has a gable roof. With an attached shed roof screened porch. It has a wood clapboard exterior, with a centrally aligned rectangular brick chimney. The structure is a low posted, Cape Cod–style dwelling, near symmetrical designed front façade. It is an L-shaped structure that stands one and a half stories tall. Entrance into the home can be through the southern façade (which is the near symmetrical aligned façade being referred to) or the eastern faćade. Even the exterior door skeleton keys are still present and functional, which are to the best of the owner's knowledge, original sets. It has open timber ceiling framed interiors with nineteenth-century six-over-six sash windows. The two open fireplaces, one in the Western and one in the Eastern rooms of the first story of the home, which historically would have been best known as the bedroom quarters and the hearth area respectively. The room in the North of the home also features a chimney and fireplace. The Cape is currently a one bedroom, one bathroom home with a second large living area above on the second floor.

== Farm house ==
The farm house was built by Sedgley about 1720, and being that a growing family required larger quarters, Sedgley constructed the six-room, 2 1/2-story dwelling. This dwelling is more substantial than the first, although the older cape probably became a residence in due time for the oldest son, Jonathan Sedgley II. The house sits on a granite foundation. The 1720 original granite, U-shaped cellar, recently converted to a wine cellar. The original structure is rectangular in form and is symmetrical. It has a gable roof and a large rectangular brick chimney centrally extruding from it. It is a frame-constructed structure with a clapboard exterior. It has open timber ceiling framed interiors with nineteenth-century six-over-six sash windows. The dwelling has four open fireplaces and one open hearth fireplace used traditionally for preparation of the family's meals, in its completion of construction, this made for a total of one fireplace in each room of the first and second floors. Since the original structure it has twice had two-story additions, once in the nineteenth century and once in the twentieth century. The Farm House is currently a four bedroom, two bathroom house with a large livable third story area as well.

== Carriage house ==
Built later in the eighteenth century by Jonathan Sedgley and Jonathan Sedgley II, being that the growing family required a shelter for their many carriages. It sits on a granite foundation. The original structure is rectangular in form and the front façade is near symmetrical with an exterior 7' x 4' sliding track-and-wheels door. It has a gable roof and there is a brick chimney extruding from it. It is a frame-constructed structure with a clapboard exterior. Sometime in the late nineteenth or early twentieth century it was converted to a two-story dwelling. It has open timber ceiling framed interiors with nineteenth-century six-over-six sash windows. The Carriage House is currently a three bedroom, two bathroom home.

== Stables building ==
This structure is directly overlays the footprint in were the frame-constructed stables structure once stood later in Jonathan Sedgley II's life. With a granite foundation, the original two-story structure is rectangular in form with a gable roof and a wood clapboard exterior. A fully finished structure came to be in the twentieth century. Featuring a 25' x 25' exterior sliding track-and-wheels door to cover a very large area of window sashes, as well as two 7' x 4' exterior sliding track-and-wheels doors on either side of the large one. It has open timber ceiling framed interiors. The Stable Building is currently not a dwelling structure.

== Outbuildings ==
The cape and the farm home structures each have adjacent outbuildings, built on granite foundations. The two are both 1 1/2-story tall with gable-style roofs. The structures are wood clapboard exteriors with near symmetrical window and door alignments on the façades. The outbuilding adjacent to the farm home has a chimney feature. The two outbuildings took on later additions of shed roof structures, single-story shed or garage structure attached. One outbuilding features an eighteenth-century 7' x 4' exterior sliding track-and-wheels door. It has open timber ceiling framed interiors with nineteenth-century six-over-six sash windows. Both outbuildings are not currently dwelling structures.

== Land Holdings ==
Presently The John Sedgley Homestead lies between Chases Pond Road and lower Scituate Road in York. Historically prior to the building of the Homestead, Chases Pond Road would have existed in some form of a path starting at the summit of Mount Agamenticus, winding around Chases Pond.

Following down near the historically noted Snowshoe Rock's Abenaki tribe area natives raid of York and the surrounding villages of southern Maine, the rock is less than 1,000 feet (300 m) from the homestead. Continuing downward towards the lower ground of what could have been around the homestead property lines and following south toward the village centers of historic York or Kittery, Maine.

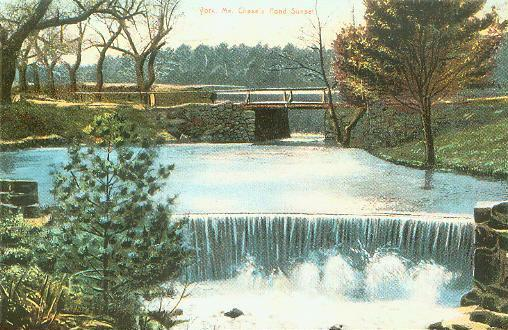
Chase's Pond in 1910

The structures sit respectively in that such order from highest ground to the lowest on the property. Even though only three acres was registered with The National Register of Historic Places as the direct footprint of the homestead foundations, it rested on a very large land holding. Near the northernmost point of the property, next to Scituate Road, is a very old stone-stacked water well that is currently not in use. There is a 30-square-foot (2.8 m^{2}) family cemetery not far from the homes that holds the first two generations of the Sedgley family as well as other that were part of the family- the Adam's and Burbank's of the village. On the lower elevated parts of the property runs a small brook, with water attributing from Scituate Pond.

Historically it is believed the primary uses for the land would have been vegetable crops, fruit orchards, and livestock. About a half of a dozen heirloom apple, pear, and cherry trees still stand on the property currently. Some of the trees have girth sizes that date back at least 200 years old. The secondary uses of the land holdings may have very well served for recreational animals and traditional events like maypole and spinning hoop for the children. As well as activities like horseback riding for the whole family from the stables.

== Publications ==
- Old House Interiors; Spring 1997 Cover Story
- Previous Prive Business- The John Sedgley Homestead Restaurant Place Setting & Poster; Illustrated by: Rose Labrie c. 1964

== See also ==
- National Register of Historic Places listings in York County, Maine
