= Felch Corner, Maine =

- Unincorporated community
- Location within Maine Location within the United States
- Coordinates: 43°40′44″N 70°47′10″W
- Country: United States
- State: Maine
- County: York
- Elevation: 531 ft (162 m)
- Time zone: UTC-5 (Eastern (EST))
  - Summer (DST): UTC-4 (EDT)
- GNIS feature ID: 566089

Felch Corner is an unincorporated community in York County, Maine, United States.

== History ==
Established by Abijah Felch and his wife Lydia Clarke, Felch Corner was the first settlement in the area. Felch had served in the American Revolutionary War, and then received a land grant "between the Great and Little Ossipee rivers...in the wilderness". Felch helped found nearby Limerick, and then served there as town clerk, assessor, treasurer and selectmen. He later adopted his orphaned grandson, Alpheus Felch, the future governor of Michigan.

An inn was established by Jacob Bradbury, and local elections were held there.

Historic buildings in Felch Corner include the Hughes Home, the oldest house in the Limerick area, and Leavitt Tavern—established by Nathaniel Leavitt, a Captain under George Washington—now a private residence.
