= York Harbor, Maine =

- Census-designated place
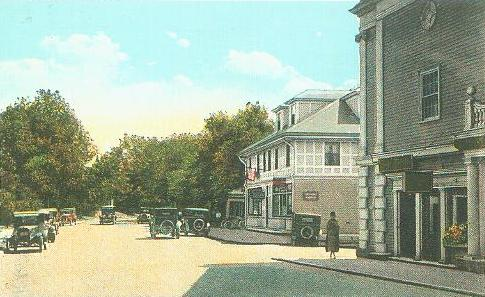
- York Street and the Lancaster Building, c. 1922

- Location within Maine Location within the United States
- Coordinates: 43°08′26″N 70°38′26″W
- Country: United States
- State: Maine
- County: York

Area
  - Total: 3.49 sq mi (9.05 km^{2})
  - Land: 3.20 sq mi (8.30 km^{2})
  - Water: 0.29 sq mi (0.75 km^{2})
- Elevation: 69 ft (21 m)

Population (2020)
  - Total: 3,132
  - Density: 977.0/sq mi (377.22/km^{2})
- Time zone: UTC-5 (Eastern (EST))
  - Summer (DST): UTC-4 (EDT)
- ZIP Codes: 03911 (York Harbor); 03909 (York)
- Area code: 207
- FIPS code: 23-88160
- GNIS feature ID: 2377974

York Harbor is a census-designated place (CDP) in the town of York in York County, Maine, United States. As of the 2020 census, York Harbor had a population of 3,132. York Harbor is a distinguished former Gilded Age summer colony noted for its resort architecture. It is part of the Portland–South Portland–Biddeford, Maine Metropolitan Statistical Area.

== History ==
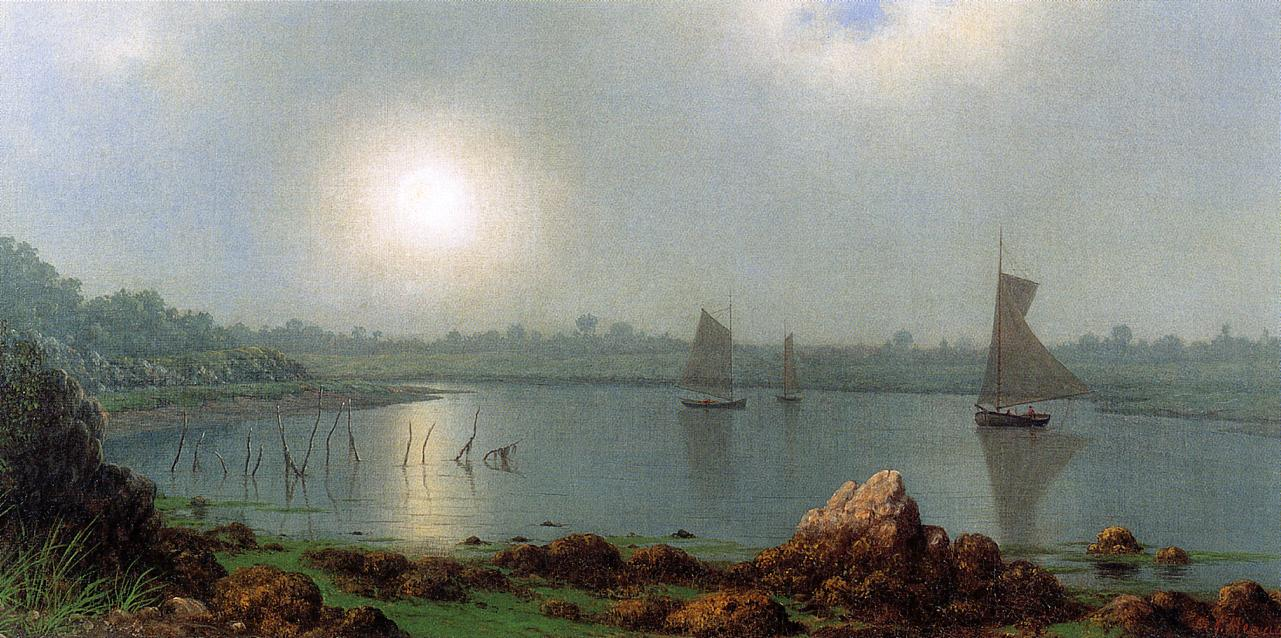
York Harbor, Coast of Maine, 1877, by Martin Johnson Heade

York was a prosperous seaport in the 18th century. Its harbor, then known as Lower Town, was lined with wharves and warehouses to which upriver settlers brought their goods for trade and shipping. The tongue of land at the mouth of the York River was called Gallows Point, where criminals at Old York Gaol in York Village were hanged. At high tide the tongue became an island, from which a ferry licensed in 1652 crossed to Seabury.

During the American Revolution, fishermen and their families abandoned the Isles of Shoals off the coast and floated their homes to the Lower Town waterfront, where they were rebuilt. They hauled their boats at Lobster Cove and dried their catch on fish flakes, after which the tongue would be named Stage Neck. In 1807, President Thomas Jefferson's embargo crippled local mercantile trade, and by the Civil War, Stage Neck had deteriorated into a ramshackle slum.

After the Union victory, Nathaniel Grant Marshall (1812-1882), a lawyer, had a vision to convert the poorest section of Lower Town into a first-class summer emporium for wealthy tourists. He bought Stage Neck, razed the fishermen's shacks and in 1871 built a grand hotel called the Marshall House. As part of its upgrade, Lower Town was renamed York Harbor. Steamers began arriving with families drawn to the Maine shore from the heat and pollution in Boston, New York, Chicago, Philadelphia and Baltimore. Many liked the area enough to build summer mansions, characteristically in the Shingle Style, during the 1880-1890 boom. Soon York Harbor joined Bar Harbor and Newport as fashionable East Coast summer destinations.

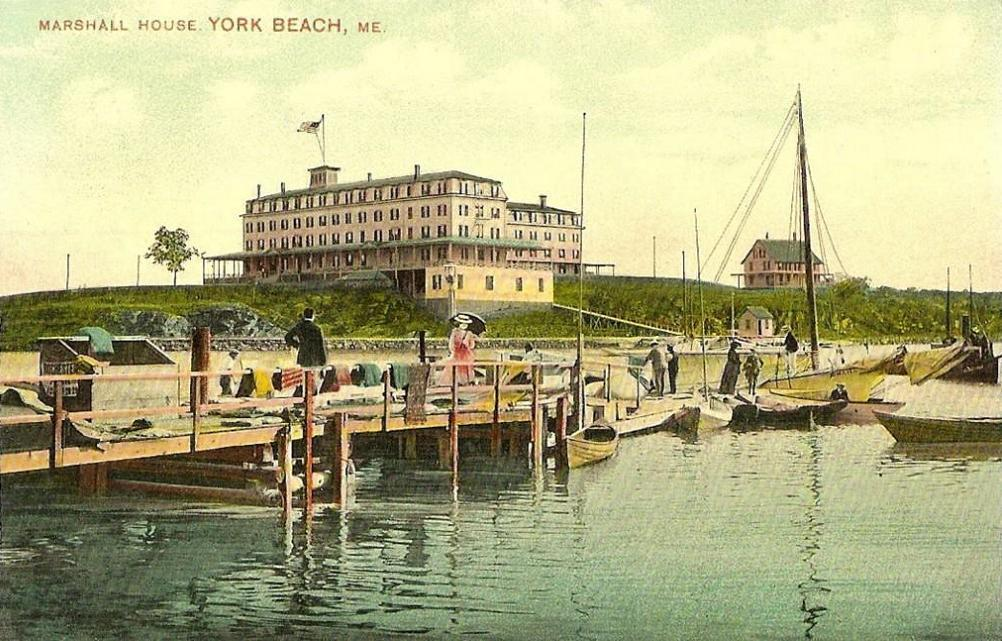
The Marshall House in 1909

Competing hotels were built, including Harmon Hall and the Albracca Hotel. But the Marshall House was the largest, accommodating 325 guests by 1900. It offered telephone and telegraph offices, a livery stable, riding and bathing facilities, tennis courts, barbershop, billiards room, ballroom, sailing, fishing excursions and canoes for picnics up the York River. The Marshalls started both an electric and water company, and headed the effort to build the York Harbor & Beach Railroad, opened in 1887.

When the Marshall House burned in 1916, it was rebuilt in fire-resistant brick the following year to designs by noted Portland architect John Calvin Stevens. It resumed its role as the center of York Harbor social life. At its porte-cochère, chauffeur-driven limousines from the estates deposited their owners in evening gowns and tuxedoes, to be joined by hotel patrons for dinner at 7:30 p.m. Post-prandial entertainments included chamber music by a Boston Symphony ensemble in the lobby, or Saturday dancing and costume parties in the ballroom.

But a rift grew between York Harbor and York Beach further up the coast, which catered to the less affluent. The former disapproved of the latter's "cottage and campground" philosophy, and tried to prevent the trolley connecting the two. In 1908, York Harbor proposed secession from York, first as a new town called Yorktown, then as Gorges after Sir Ferdinando Gorges, the early proprietor of Maine. Because the split would have deprived remaining York of much of real value within the community, including the town hall, it failed and The Yorks reconciled.

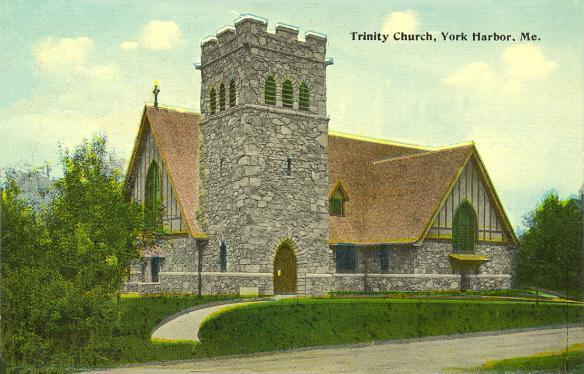
Trinity Church in 1913

Development here began in the 1870s and virtually ended in the 1920s, leaving York Harbor a microcosm of period resort architecture, now converted for year-round use. The Marshall House was sold in 1957 and demolished in 1972, to be replaced with condominiums and the Stage Neck Inn (designed by Sasaki, Dawson, DeMay Associates). However, the York community retains a wealth of Second Empire, Shingle Style, Mission Revival and Colonial Revival architecture. Of particular note are the Lancaster Building designed by E. B. Blaisdell and built in 1895, Trinity Episcopal Church designed by H. J. Hardenbergh and built in 1908, and the York Harbor Reading Room designed by James Purdon and built in 1910. The Cliff Walk, an ancient shoreline path lined with beach roses, winds along Eastern Point ledges above the surf.

== Geography ==
The York Harbor CDP extends westward to include all of York Village as well. The western boundary of the CDP is U.S. Route 1, the southern boundary is the York River, and the northern boundary abuts the southern edge of the Cape Neddick CDP, more commonly known as York Beach. The Gulf of Maine, an arm of the Atlantic Ocean, forms the eastern edge of the community.

According to the United States Census Bureau, the CDP has a total area of 3.5 square miles (9.1 km^{2}), of which 3.2 square miles (8.3 km^{2}) is land and 0.3 square miles (0.78 km^{2}), or 8.23%, is water.

== Demographics ==
Historical population
Census	Pop.	Note	%±
2020	3,132		—
U.S. Decennial Census

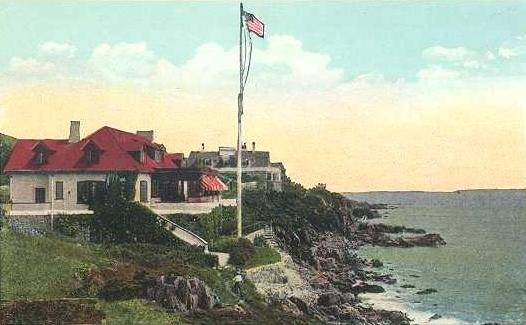
The York Harbor Reading Room and Cliff Walk c. 1920

=== 2020 census ===
As of the 2020 census, York Harbor had a population of 3,132. The median age was 56.7 years. 14.8% of residents were under the age of 18 and 35.8% of residents were 65 years of age or older. For every 100 females there were 77.3 males, and for every 100 females age 18 and over there were 74.9 males age 18 and over.

100.0% of residents lived in urban areas, while 0.0% lived in rural areas.

There were 1,321 households in York Harbor, of which 16.3% had children under the age of 18 living in them. Of all households, 49.2% were married-couple households, 12.6% were households with a male householder and no spouse or partner present, and 35.2% were households with a female householder and no spouse or partner present. About 37.8% of all households were made up of individuals and 26.2% had someone living alone who was 65 years of age or older.

There were 1,795 housing units, of which 26.4% were vacant. The homeowner vacancy rate was 1.3% and the rental vacancy rate was 13.1%.

Racial composition as of the 2020 census
Race	Number	Percent
White	2,997	95.7%
Black or African American	9	0.3%
American Indian and Alaska Native	1	0.0%
Asian	20	0.6%
Native Hawaiian and Other Pacific Islander	0	0.0%
Some other race	9	0.3%
Two or more races	96	3.1%
Hispanic or Latino (of any race)	29	0.9%

=== 2000 census ===
As of the census of 2000, there were 3,321 people, 1,334 households, and 895 families residing in the CDP. The population density was 1,035.6 inhabitants per square mile (399.8/km^{2}). There were 1,601 housing units at an average density of 499.3 per square mile (192.8/km^{2}). The racial makeup of the CDP was 98.13% White, 0.12% African American, 0.06% Native American, 0.57% Asian, 0.21% from other races, and 0.90% from two or more races. Hispanic or Latino of any race were 0.63% of the population.

There were 1,334 households, out of which 28.1% had children under the age of 18 living with them, 58.5% were married couples living together, 6.9% had a female householder with no husband present, and 32.9% were non-families. 28.3% of all households were made up of individuals, and 13.3% had someone living alone who was 65 years of age or older. The average household size was 2.35 and the average family size was 2.88.

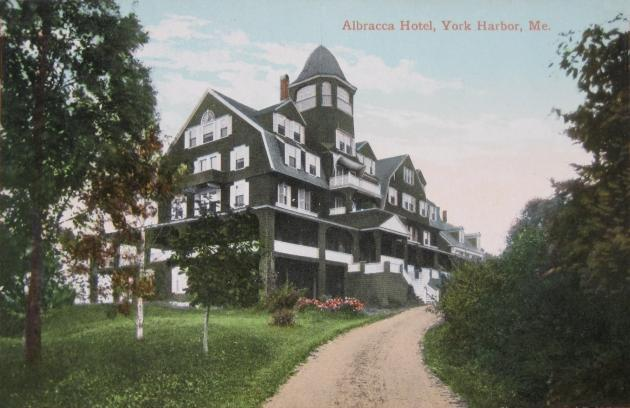
Albracca Hotel in 1911

In the CDP, the population was spread out, with 21.9% under the age of 18, 4.2% from 18 to 24, 22.5% from 25 to 44, 27.7% from 45 to 64, and 23.7% who were 65 years of age or older. The median age was 46 years. For every 100 females, there were 81.8 males. For every 100 females age 18 and over, there were 78.9 males.

The median income for a household in the CDP was $53,969, and the median income for a family was $71,164. Males had a median income of $49,706 versus $30,850 for females. The per capita income for the CDP was $29,016. About 1.0% of families and 5.3% of the population were below the poverty line, including 2.4% of those under age 18 and 11.9% of those age 65 or over.
