= York Cliffs, Maine =

Coordinates: 43°11′28″N 70°36′10″W

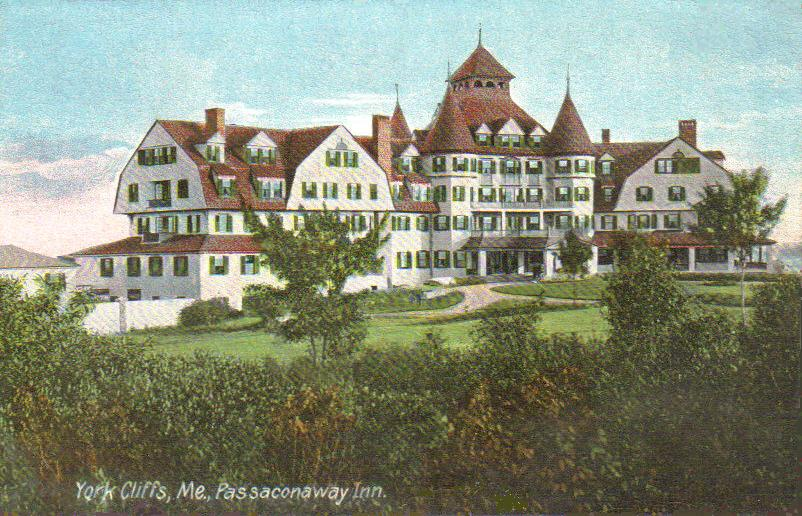
The "Passaconaway Inn" in York Cliffs (from a c. 1908 postcard)

York Cliffs is a village in the town of York in York County, Maine, United States. It lies east of the village of Cape Neddick and north of York Beach.
