= Bald Head, Maine =

Village in Maine, United States

Coordinates: 43°13′15″N 70°34′38″W

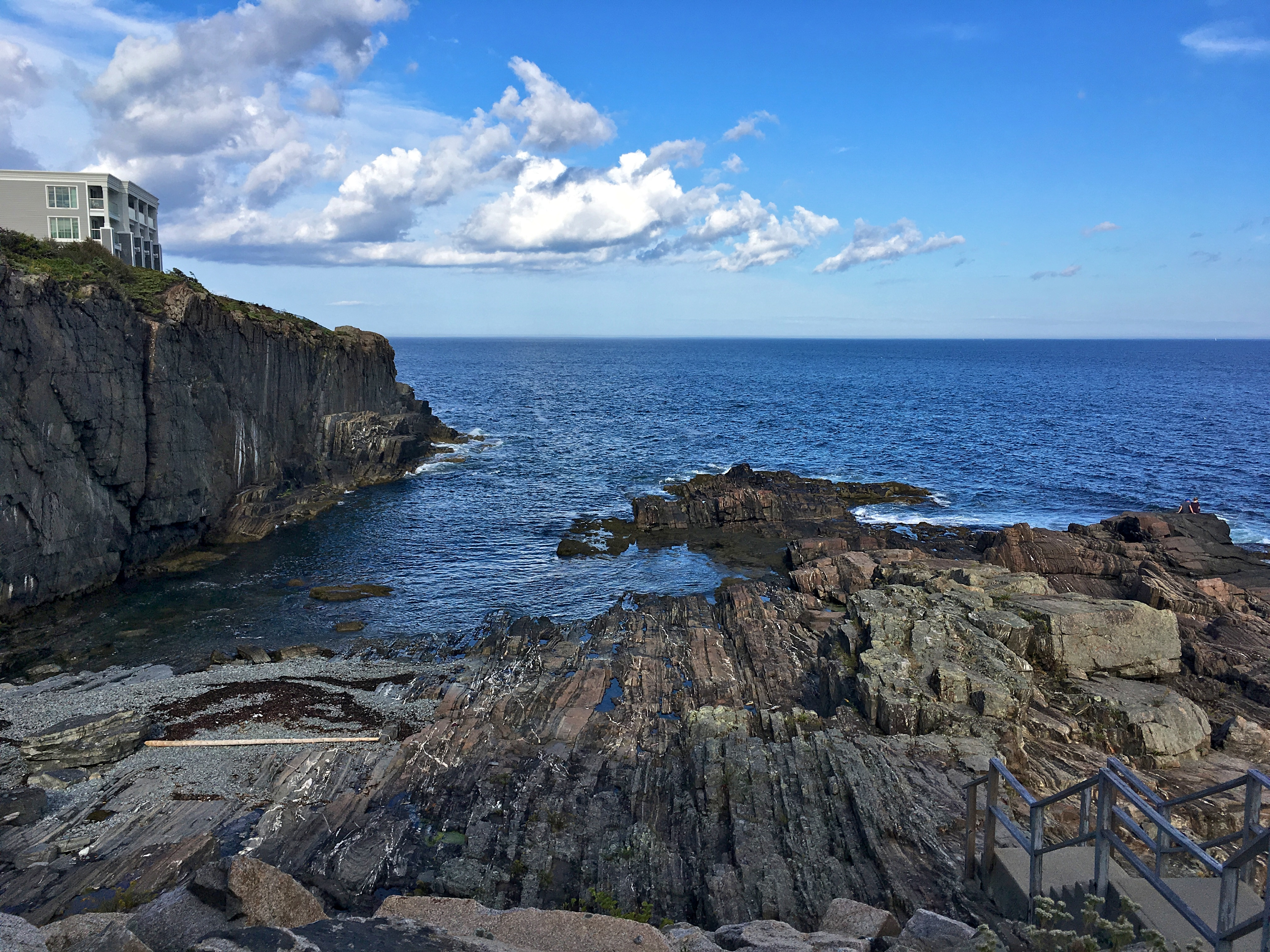
Bald Head Cliff

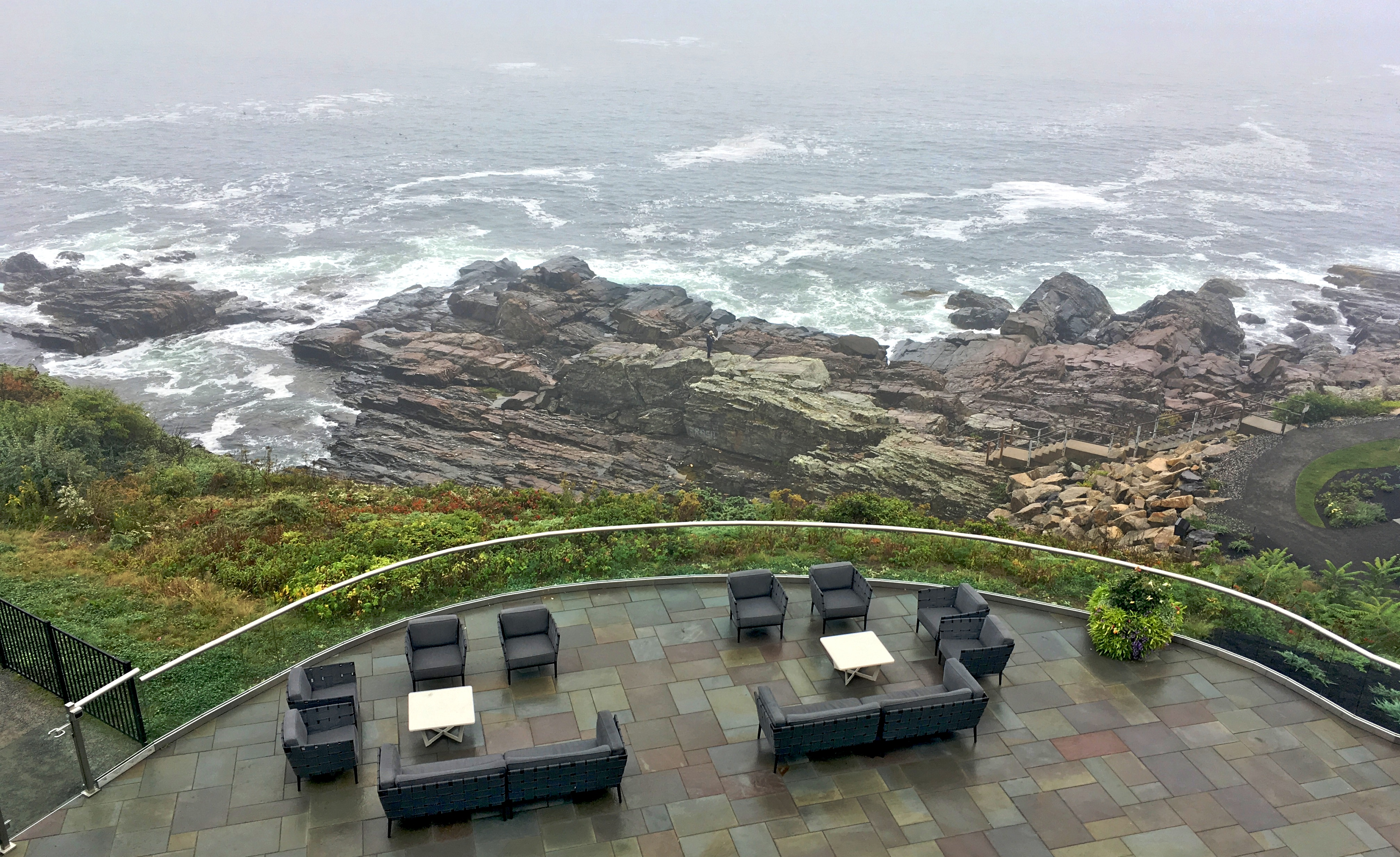
Cliff and main rock formation as seen from a guest room at the Cliff House resort

Bald Head is a village in the town of York in York County, Maine, United States, on the Atlantic coast.

The community takes its name from a nearby rock formation of the same name. Bald Head has been noted for its unusual place name.

== See also ==
- List of rock formations that resemble human beings
