= David N. Ott =

American politician and lawyer (1937–2020)

Member of the Maine House of Representatives
- In office 1991–1998

Member of the Maine House of Representatives
- In office 2005–2006

Personal details
- Born: April 29, 1937 Titusville, Pennsylvania, US
- Died: May 31, 2020 (aged 83) York, Maine, US
- Occupation: Politician, lawyer

David N. Ott (April 29, 1937 – May 31, 2020) was an American politician and lawyer.

Ott was born in Titusville, Pennsylvania, on April 29, 1937. He moved with his family to Pittsburgh, Pennsylvania and graduated from West View High School in 1955. Ott graduated from Bucknell University in 1959. He served in the United States Army and was commissioned a second lieutenant. Ott graduated from Dickinson School of Law in 1969. He moved to York, Maine and was admitted to the Maine bar in 1970. Ott practiced law in York, Maine and served as the town moderator. Ott served in the Maine House of Representatives from 1991 to 1998 and in 2005 and 2006 as a Republican. Ott died in York, Maine, on May 31, 2020, aged 83.
