= Mount Agamenticus =

Monadnock in York, Maine, U.S.

Coordinates: 43°13′23″N 70°41′31″W

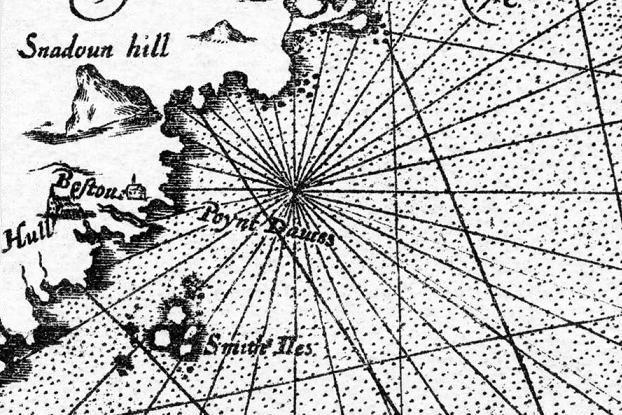
The mountain labeled Snadoun Hill in 1616

Mount Agamenticus is a 692 ft (211 m) high monadnock in the town of York, Maine. The area surrounding the summit is a park reservation which provides habitat for wildlife and a venue for recreation. The greater Agamenticus region covers nearly 30,000 acres (12,000 ha) in the southern Maine towns of Eliot, Ogunquit, South Berwick, Wells and York.

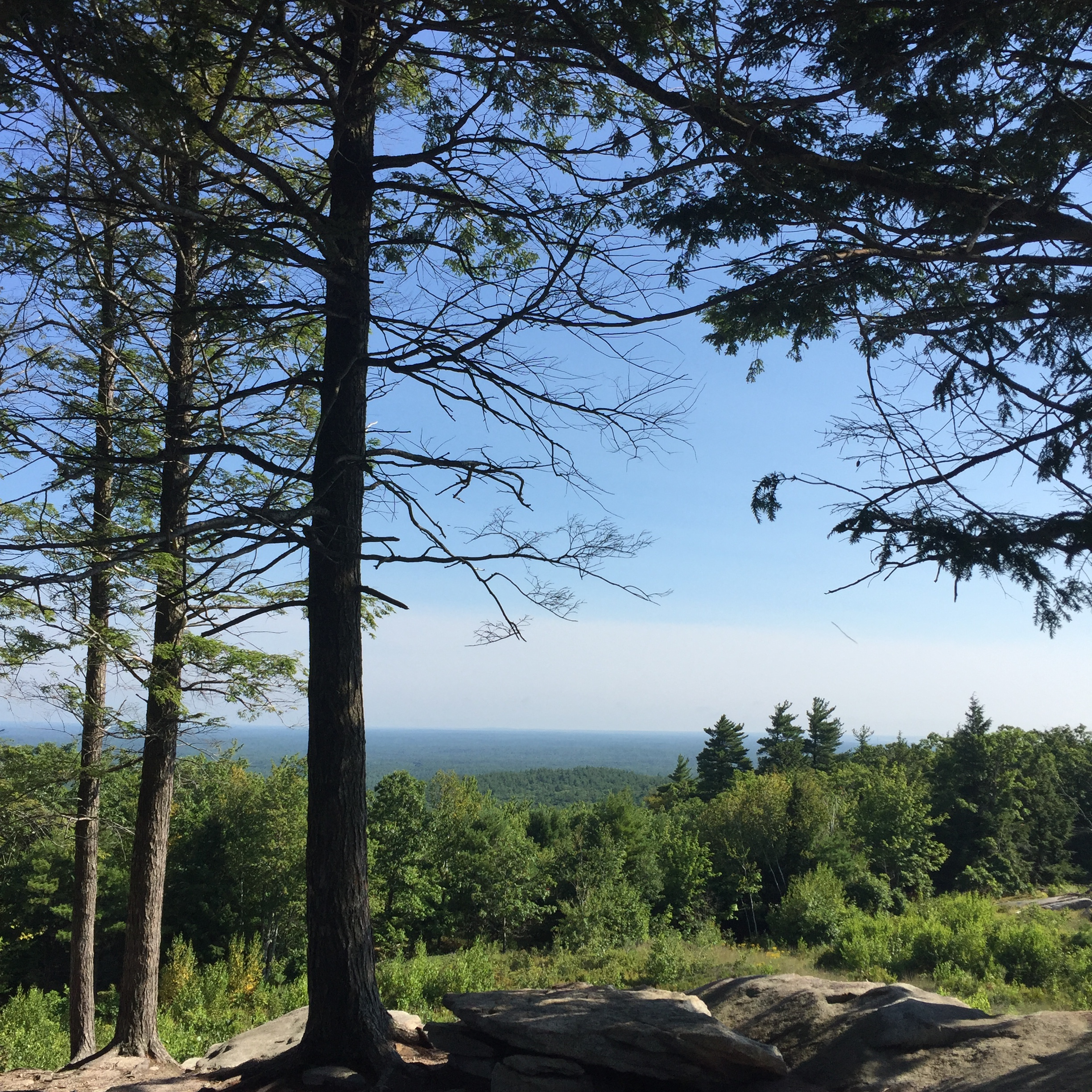
View from the summit of Mount Agamenticus in August.

Though under 700 ft (210 m) high, Mount Agamenticus was historically a noted landmark for sailors. Mount Agamenticus is also affectionately known by older locals as "Big A," the nickname of a ski slope that once operated on its northeast flank, remnants of which can be seen both near the summit and along the trails. A memorial cairn to Mi'kmaq chief St. Aspinquid, who allegedly converted to Christianity, is located near the summit.

== History ==
In 1614, Captain John Smith explored and charted the Gulf of Maine.

=== Name ===
Upon returning to London, Mason presented his record of the New World, complete with aboriginal place names, to Prince Charles, "...humbly entreating his Highnesse hee would please to change their barbarous names for such English, as posteritie might say Prince Charles was their God-father..." He complied, and his choices were featured on the map published in 1616 that accompanied Smith's A Description of New England. On paper, the mountain's Indian name, "Sassanows," became "Snadoun Hill." But many royal recommendations were not retained. Instead, the mountain would assume the general name of the York settlement of 1630, the "Plantation of Agamenticus," which itself took the Abenaki name for the York River.

=== Plantation of Agamenticus ===
The Agamenticus plantation was personally established from afar by Sir Ferdinando Gorges, whom received an original land charter in 1606.

=== St. Aspinquid ===
St. Aspinquid (St. Aspenquid) was an alleged Mi'kmaq sachem around whom little is known, including whether he ever even existed.

He allegedly was murdered in 1696 and was declared a martyr and buried atop Mount Agamenticus.

According to legend, Saint Aspinquid (sometimes Aspenquid) was born in May 1588, and after converting to Christianity, spread the gospel to tribes across the continent.

His funeral and burial atop Mount Agamenticus in May 1682, at which 6,712 animals were allegedly sacrificed, was allegedly attended by hundreds, even thousands, of Native Americans.

Numerous people have written and questioned the legendary account, even to the point of challenging the existence of St. Aspinquid. Some have suggested the Saint is a fanciful version of real Chief Passaconaway. In the 1881 essay A Winter Drive, Seacoast literary legend Sarah Orne Jewett remarked that "...I could never trace this legend beyond a story in one of the county newspapers, and I have never heard any tradition among the people that bears the least likeness to it."

A symbolic cairn on the summit stands as memorial to the Aspinquid legend.

=== As a ski area ===
Mount Agamenticus has the highest elevation of any hill within its distance to the ocean from Portland, Maine, to Brownsville, Texas. The ski area there, The Big A, had a 2,400-foot (730 m) double chairlift, a 1,200-foot (370 m) T-Bar, and a rope tow, and was supplemented with both snowmaking and night skiing. At its peak, the area had nine trails spread over 500 feet (150 m) of vertical drop, including a one-mile-long (1.6 km) beginner trail, two novice trails, two intermediate trails, and four advanced trails. The facility had a summit lodge, complete with a ski shop and 400-car parking lot on top the mountain, not at its base. The ski area operated from 1966 to 1974.

== Today ==
Today there is a park at the summit, with a trail network covering the area. There is a large cell phone mast at the top, arrayed with various other antenna. It is one of the best places for viewing hawks in New England.

=== Trails ===
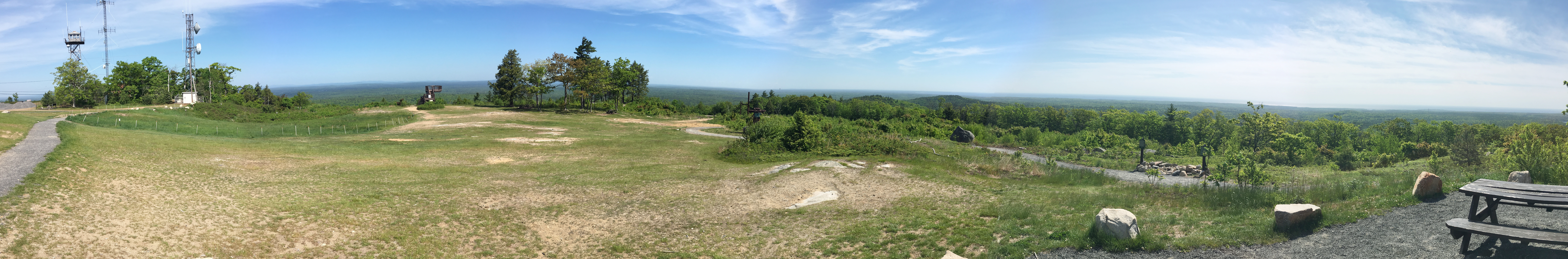
Partial panoramic view from the summit of Mount Agamenticus

In addition to a road to the summit and limited parking there, the mountain has a network of trails for hiking. Its short access trail from the main parking area at the base leads to the ring trail, which encircles the mountain’s summit. Feeder trails off of it offer access to the top.

== See also ==
- St. Apenquid’s Chapel
