= York, Maine =

- Town
- Seal

- Location within Maine Location within the United States
- Coordinates: 43°09′48″N 70°38′55″W
- Country: United States
- State: Maine
- County: York
- Settled: 1624
- Incorporated: 1652

Area
  - Total: 131.78 sq mi (341.3 km^{2})
  - Land: 54.67 sq mi (141.6 km^{2})
  - Water: 77.11 sq mi (199.7 km^{2})
- Elevation: 7 ft (2.1 m)

Population (2020)
  - Total: 13,723
  - Density: 251.0/sq mi (96.92/km^{2})
- Time zone: UTC-5 (Eastern (EST))
  - Summer (DST): UTC-4 (EDT)
- ZIP Codes: 03909 (York); 03902 (Cape Neddick); 03910 (York Beach); 03911 (York Harbor)
- Area code: 207
- FIPS code: 23-87985
- GNIS feature ID: 582832
- Website: www.yorkmaine.org

York is a town in York County, Maine, United States, near the southern tip of the state. The population in the 2020 census was 13,723. Situated beside the Atlantic Ocean on the Gulf of Maine, York is a well-known summer resort town. It is home to three 18-hole golf clubs, four sandy beaches, and Mount Agamenticus. From south to north, it is divided into the villages of Bald Head, York Village, York Harbor, York Beach and Cape Neddick.

York is part of the Portland metropolitan area.

== History ==
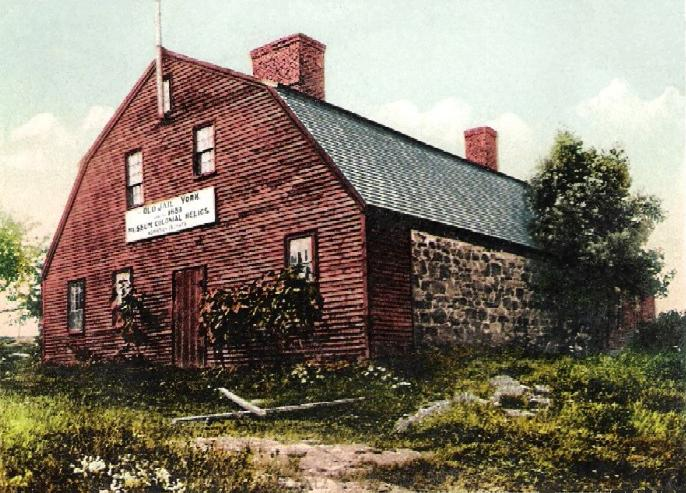
The Old Gaol (Jail) in 1901

First settled by Europeans in 1624, the plantation was originally called Agamenticus, the Abenaki term for the York River, which also was the name given to the hill, visible from sea.

In 1638, settlers changed the name to Bristol after Bristol, England, from which they had immigrated. Envisioning a great city arising from the wilderness, Sir Ferdinando Gorges, lord proprietor of Maine under the Plymouth patent, named the capital of his province Gorgeana.

On March 1, 1642, by charter of King Charles I, Gorgeana became the first incorporated city in America.

Following Gorges' death, the Massachusetts Bay Colony claimed his dominion. In 1652, York, Massachusetts, was incorporated from a portion of Gorgeana, making it the second oldest town in Maine after Kittery, incorporated two years earlier. It was named for York, England; however, control of the region was contested between New England and New France, which incited Native Americans to attack English settlements throughout the French and Indian Wars.

In 1662, the Crown ruled that Massachusetts Bay exceeded its charter and established a new government in Wells, Maine. The Royal Commission of 1664 visited York and created a new royalist government. In 1668, Major General John Leverett and Richard Waldron, on the authority of the Boston government, led a counter-coup to reincorporate York. On July 14, 1668 they led a squadron of 12 cavalrymen into York where they deposed the officials and swore in new military officers and court officials.

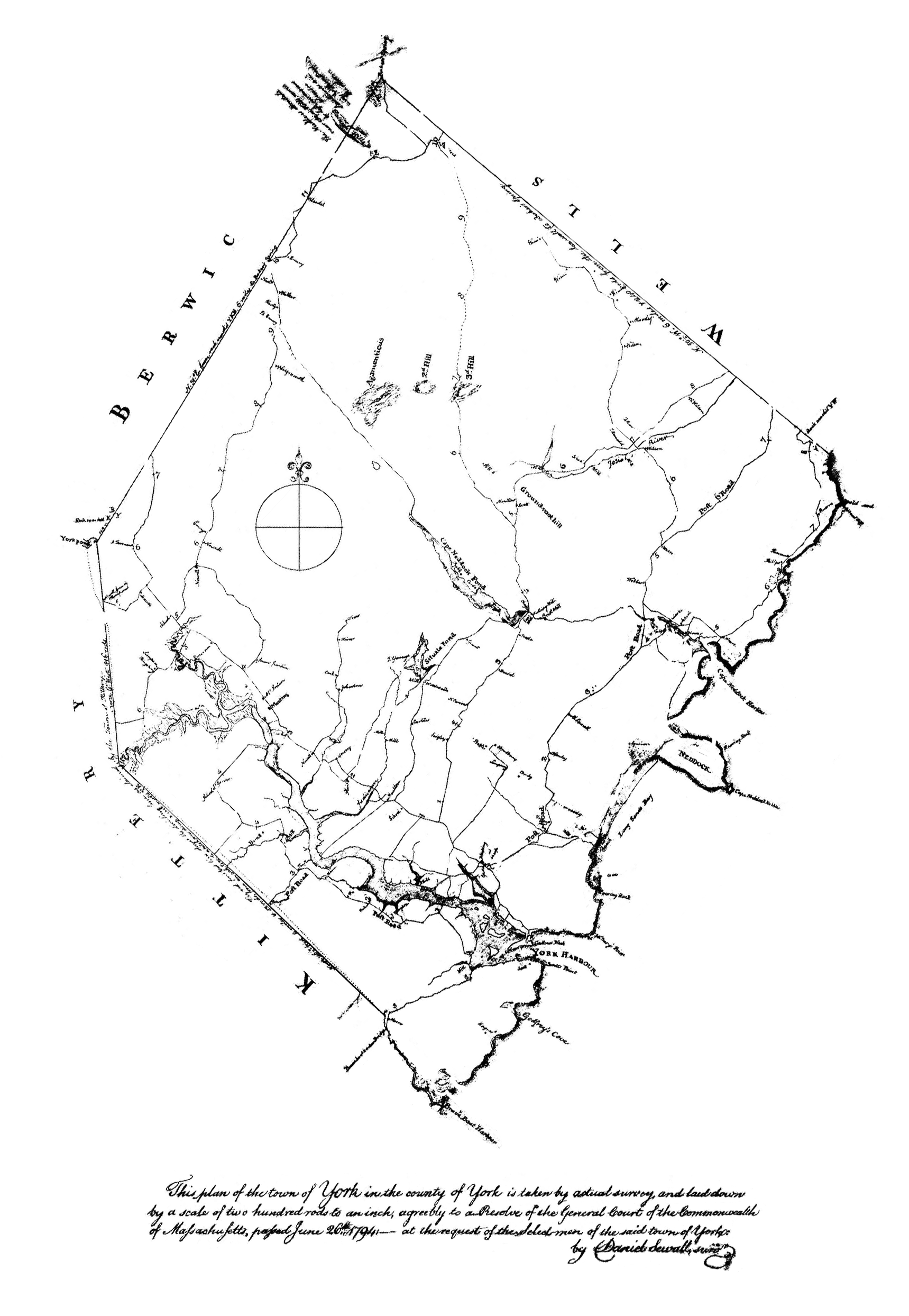
Sewall's Map of York, Maine, 1794

The first Congregational church of York was organized in 1672, by Rev. Shubael Dummer, the son of Richard Dummer and uncle to William Dummer, who became acting governor of the Province of Massachusetts Bay.

During King William's War, York was destroyed in the Candlemas Massacre of 1692. During the raid by the Abenakis, Dummer was shot at his own front door. About 50 others were slain and near 100 carried away captive, among them Dummer's wife, Lydia, and their son, where "through snows and hardships among those dragons of the desert she also quickly died"; nothing further was heard of the boy.

The final local Indian attack occurred at the Cape Neddick area during Dummer's War in 1723. Hostilities diminished with the French defeat at the Siege of Louisbourg (1745), and ceased altogether with the 1763 Treaty of Paris.

=== Trading center ===
As provincial capital and site of the Royal Gaol (Jail), York prospered. Numerous wharves and warehouses serviced trade with the West Indies. Agricultural products and lumber were shipped in exchange for sugar, molasses and other commodities. One notable merchant was John Hancock, whose establishment (John Hancock Warehouse) is now a museum. Following the Revolution, however, President Thomas Jefferson's Embargo Act of 1807 crippled trade. York, bereft of status as capitol, would not again be prosperous until after the Civil War, when its sea breezes and colonial charm, including old homes like the John Sedgley Homestead, attracted tourists.

=== Present day ===
Like Bar Harbor and Newport, Rhode Island, York became a fashionable summer resort, and retains many distinctive examples of Gilded Age architecture, particularly in the Shingle style. A cluster of historic buildings in the center of York Village are maintained as museums by the Old York Historical Society.

== The Yorks ==
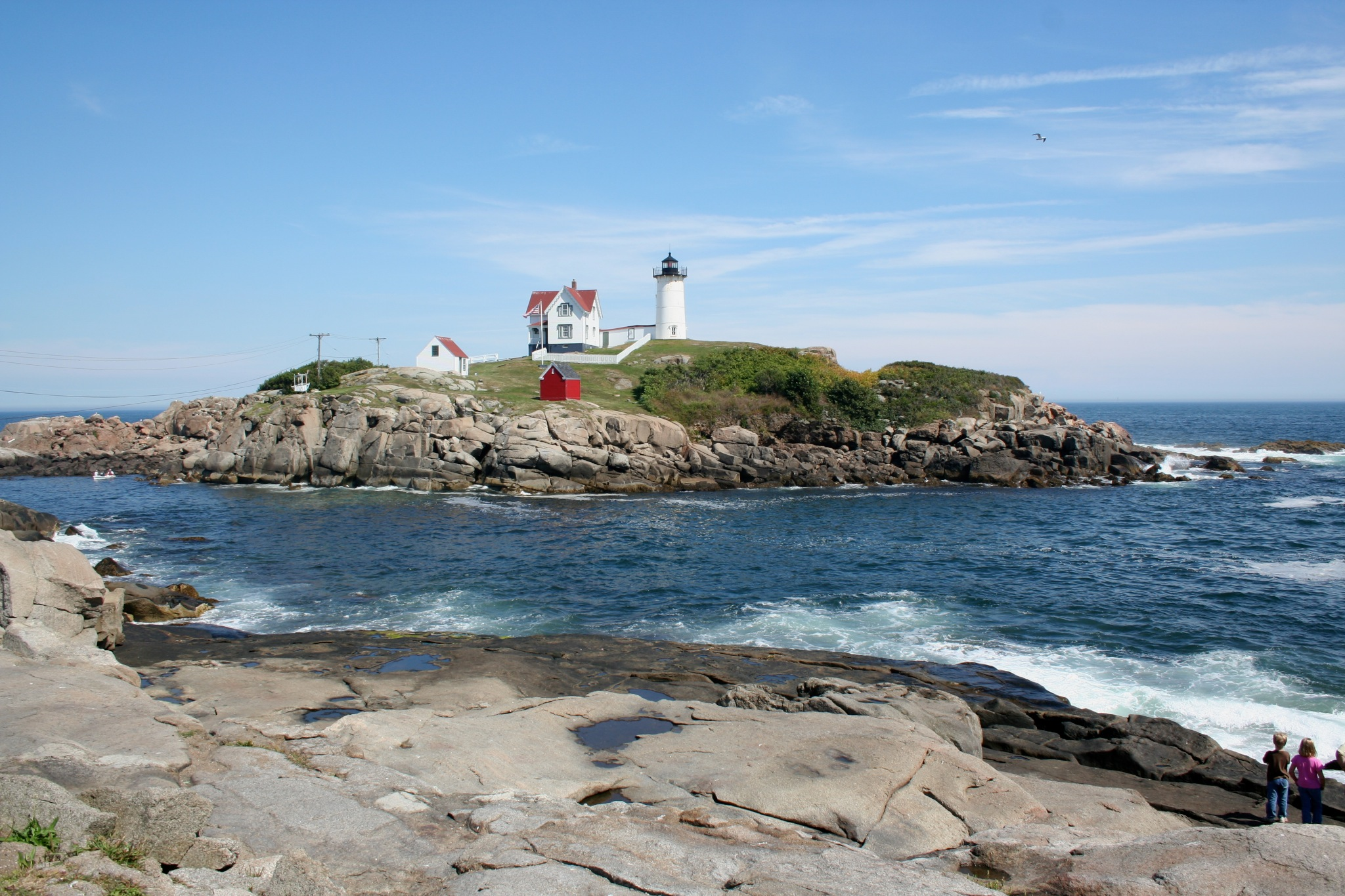
Cape Neddick Light

- York Village – including the historic structures, and upscale shops
- York Harbor – with a number of inns, historic homes and large estates
- York Beach – with attractions such as a zoo, arcades, souvenir shops and stores
- Cape Neddick – mainly residences, best known for its lighthouse

During summer months, summer residents and tourists visit Short Sands Beach, which is in the district of York Beach itself, as well as Long Sands Beach, the town's longest with more than a mile of sand stretching between York Beach and York Harbor. A number of five-star hotels and other accommodations operate in the York Beach area, although most close after summer.

A number of spots throughout The Yorks have views of the Cape Neddick Light at Nubble Rock, which has figured in both artists' work and souvenirs of the Maine coast. A photo of the Cape Neddick Light is on the Voyager 1 spacecraft labeled as Seashore, Maine. Visible in clear weather is the 133-foot (41-meter) tall Boon Island Light on Boon Island, located 6.2 miles (10.0 km) off York.

== Geography ==
According to the United States Census Bureau, the town has a total area of 131.78 square miles (341.31 km^{2}), of which 54.67 square miles (141.59 km^{2}) is land and 77.11 square miles (199.71 km^{2}) is water. The York watershed drains into the York River. The highest point in town is Mount Agamenticus, with an elevation of 692 feet (211 meters) above sea level. A road travels to the summit, where miles of hiking, biking and horse-riding trails are available. The lowest point in town is sea level, along the coastline with the Atlantic Ocean. York lies about 44 miles (71 km) south of Portland, 98 miles (158 km) south of Augusta, and 65 miles (105 km) north of Boston.

== Government ==
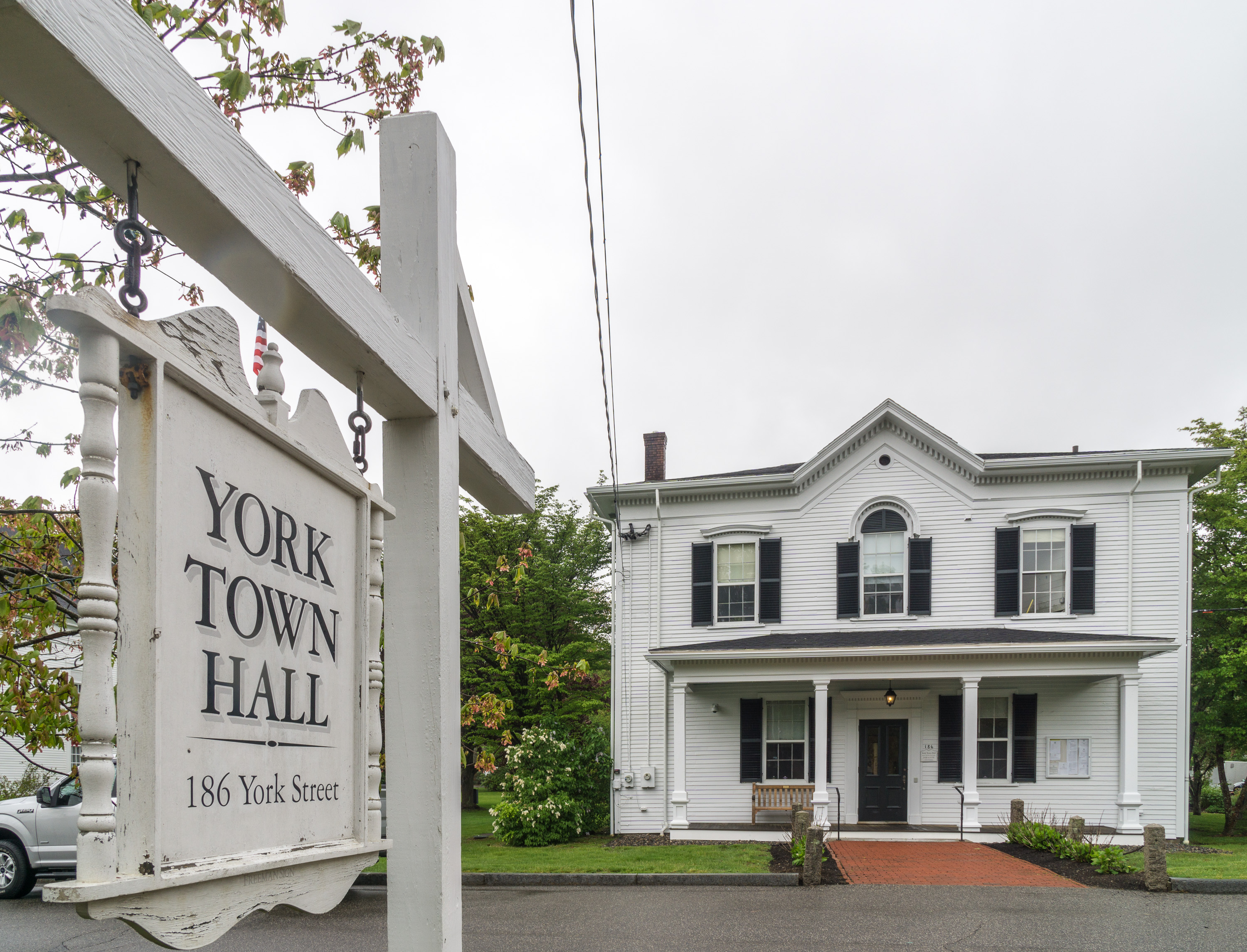
York Town Hall

York has a council-manager form of government.

== Voter registration ==
32.61% Republican, 23.44% Democrat, 0.9% Green, 43.05% Unenrolled.

Voter Registration and Party Enrollment as of October 25, 2005
Party	Percentage			
Republican	32.61%			
Democratic	23.44%			
Unaffiliated	43.05%			
Green Independent	0.90%			
Total	13,129	163	13,292	100%

== Education ==
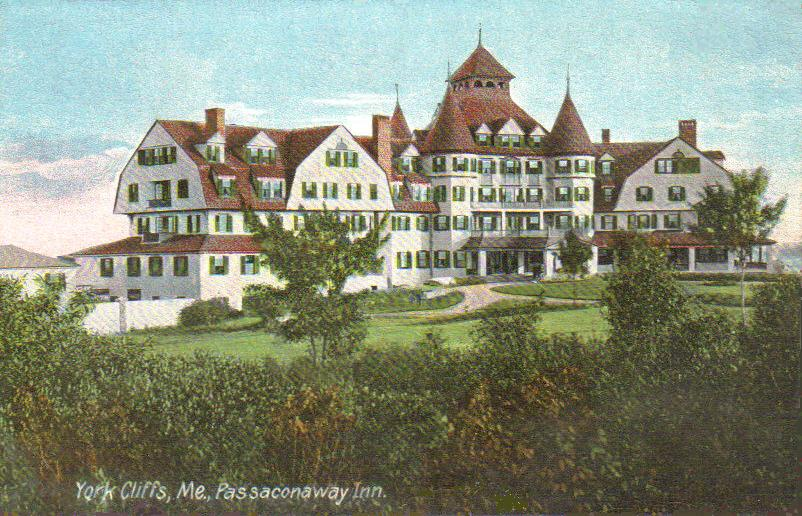
Passaconaway Inn in York Cliffs c. 1910

York School Department receives the largest portion (69%) of the town's budget. The town of York supports 2,000 students in four schools. Village Elementary School serves grades K–1. Coastal Ridge Elementary School provides education for grades 2–4. York Middle School serves students in grades 5–8, and York High School serves students in grades 9–12. Adult education is also available to York residents.

== Demographics ==
Historical population
Census	Pop.	Note	%±
1790	2,900		—
1800	2,776		−4.3%
1810	3,046		9.7%
1820	3,224		5.8%
1830	3,485		8.1%
1840	3,111		−10.7%
1850	2,980		−4.2%
1860	2,825		−5.2%
1870	2,654		−6.1%
1880	2,463		−7.2%
1890	2,444		−0.8%
1900	2,668		9.2%
1910	2,802		5.0%
1920	2,727		−2.7%
1930	2,532		−7.2%
1940	3,283		29.7%
1950	3,256		−0.8%
1960	4,663		43.2%
1970	5,690		22.0%
1980	8,465		48.8%
1990	9,818		16.0%
2000	12,854		30.9%
2010	12,529		−2.5%
2020	13,723		9.5%

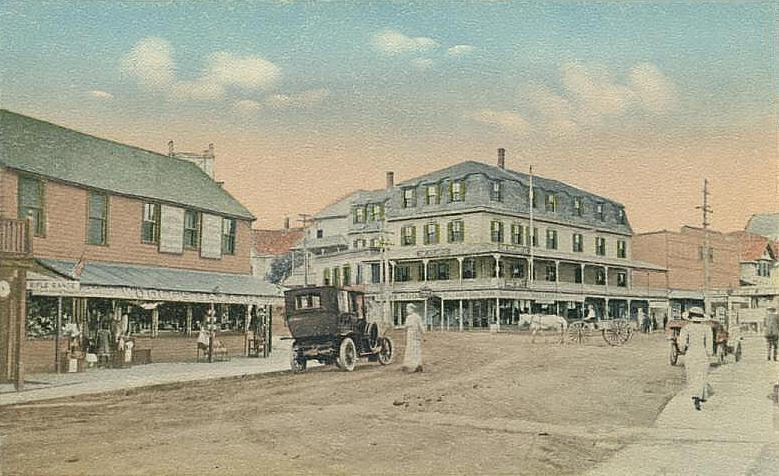
The Square, Short Sands Beach at York Beach, c. 1915

See Cape Neddick, Maine and York Harbor, Maine for demographic information compiled for the respective villages.

=== 2010 census ===
As of the census of 2010, there were 12,529 people, 5,440 households, and 3,601 families living in the town. The population density was 229.2 inhabitants per square mile (88.5/km^{2}). There were 8,649 housing units at an average density of 158.2 per square mile (61.1/km^{2}). The racial makeup of the town was 98.6% White, 0.4% African American, 0.1% Native American, 0.8% Asian, 0.3% from other races, and 0.8% from two or more races. Hispanic or Latino of any race were 1.0% of the population.

There were 5,440 households, of which 26.0% had children under the age of 18 living with them, 56.1% were married couples living together, 7.1% had a female householder with no husband present, 3.0% had a male householder with no wife present, and 33.8% were non-families. 28.5% of all households were made up of individuals, and 15.1% had someone living alone who was 65 years of age or older. The average household size was 2.30 and the average family size was 2.82.

The median age in the town was 49.3 years. 20.2% of residents were under the age of 18; 4.9% were between the ages of 18 and 24; 17.1% were from 25 to 44; 36.3% were from 45 to 64; and 21.5% were 65 years of age or older. The gender makeup of the town was 47.9% male and 52.1% female.

=== 2000 census ===
As of the census of 2000, there were 12,854 people, 5,235 households, and 3,690 families living in the town. The population density was 234.1 inhabitants per square mile (90.4/km^{2}). There were 8,053 housing units at an average density of 146.7 per square mile (56.6/km^{2}). The racial makeup of the town was 98.36% White, 0.25% African American, 0.11% Native American, 0.49% Asian, 0.02% Pacific Islander, 0.19% from other races, and 0.58% from two or more races. Hispanic or Latino of any race were 0.72% of the population.

There were 5,235 households, out of which 29.5% had children under the age of 18 living with them, 61.1% were married couples living together, 7.0% had a female householder with no husband present, and 29.5% were non-families. 24.0% of all households were made up of individuals, and 9.9% had someone living alone who was 65 years of age or older. The average household size was 2.42 and the average family size was 2.88.

In the town, the population was spread out, with 22.8% under the age of 18, 4.3% from 18 to 24, 25.7% from 25 to 44, 30.1% from 45 to 64, and 17.0% who were 65 years of age or older. The median age was 43 years. For every 100 females, there were 91.8 males. For every 100 females age 18 and over, there were 88.7 males.

The median income for a household in the town was $64,000, and the median income for a family was $73,400. Males had a median income of $49,415 versus $31,743 for females. The per capita income for the town was $30,895. About 1.3% of families and 3.8% of the population were below the poverty line, including 1.8% of those under the age of 18 and 6.7% of those 65 and older.

== Sites of interest ==
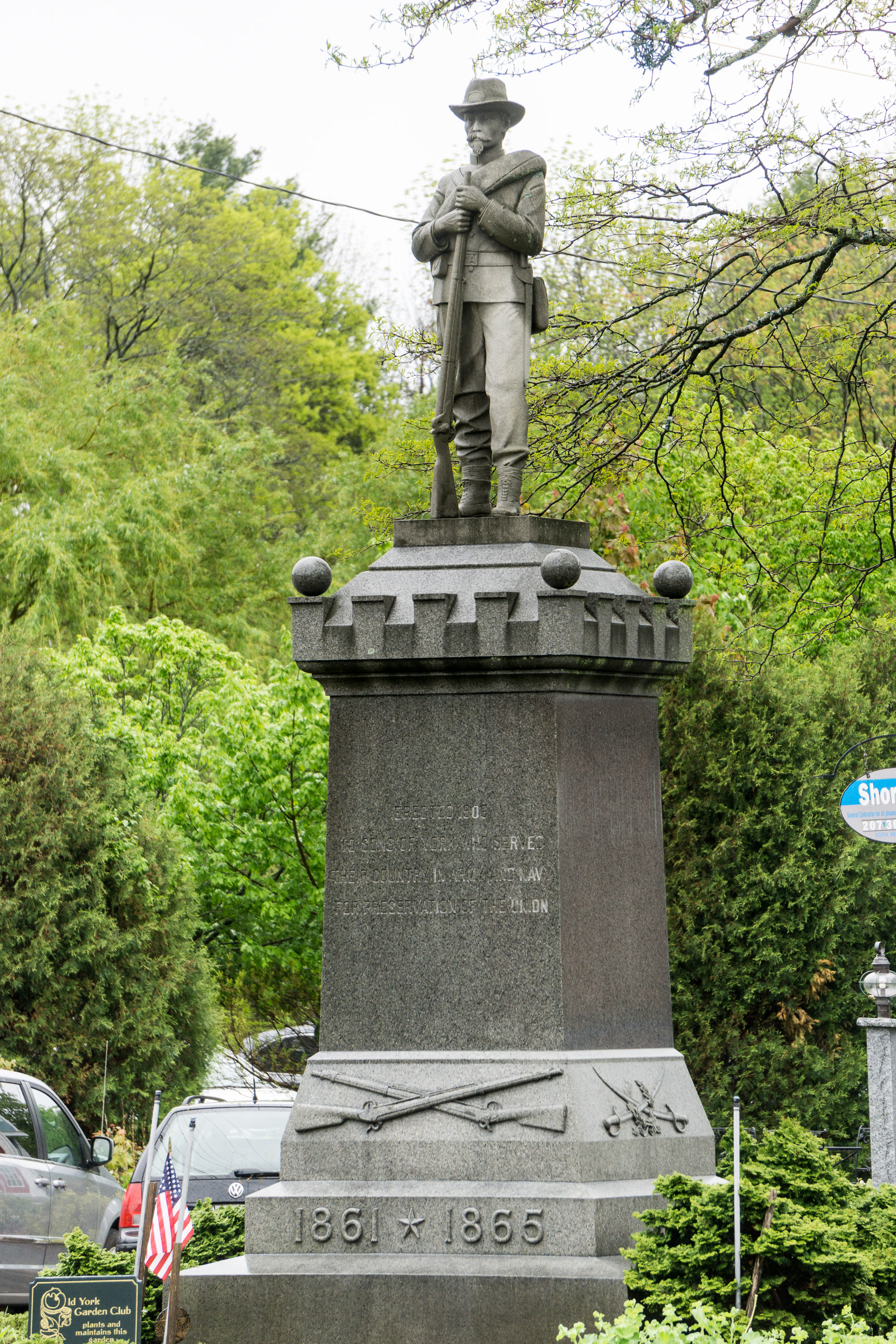
York's Civil War monument

- Cape Neddick Lighthouse (Nubble Light)
- John Sedgley Homestead
- The Goldenrod
- Short Sands Beach
- Mount Agamenticus

=== Civil War monument ===
A granite monument depicting a Civil War soldier was erected in 1906 at a traffic triangle in York Village. It has been suggested by some that his uniform appears to be incorrect for a Union soldier, as he wears a brimmed fedora and goatee; some local tour guides claim that the uniform is actually Confederate. Another explanation is that either the sculptor, Englishman Frederick Barnicoat, or designer John Staples, mistakenly depicted a uniform from the time of the Spanish–American War. It is also possible that the 20th Maine Volunteer Infantry Regiment did wear a similar uniform.

== Notable people ==
- Spencer Albee, musician
- Emerson Baker, historian, author
- Christopher Cassidy, NASA astronaut
- Mandy Cronin, ice hockey executive
- Shubael Dummer, colonial reverend and leader
- Richard Foerster, poet
- Tim Janis, musician
- Margaret E. Knight, inventor
- Theodore Lyman I, merchant and shipbuilder
- Barbara Marois, Olympic field hockey player
- Rufus McIntire, US congressman
- Jeremiah Moulton, colonial officer, judge
- David N. Ott, state representative, lawyer
- Sam Pelletier, distance runner and optometrist
- Alvah T. Ramsdell, architect
- Neil Rolde, state legislator and Maine historian
- Duncan Robinson, basketball player for the Detroit Pistons
- Walter Runte, state legislator born in York
- May Sarton, writer
- Thomas F. Spencer, US Army major general
- George Thatcher, state judge, US congressman
- Mark Twain, writer (summer resident)
- Windol Weaver, state legislator

== Gallery ==
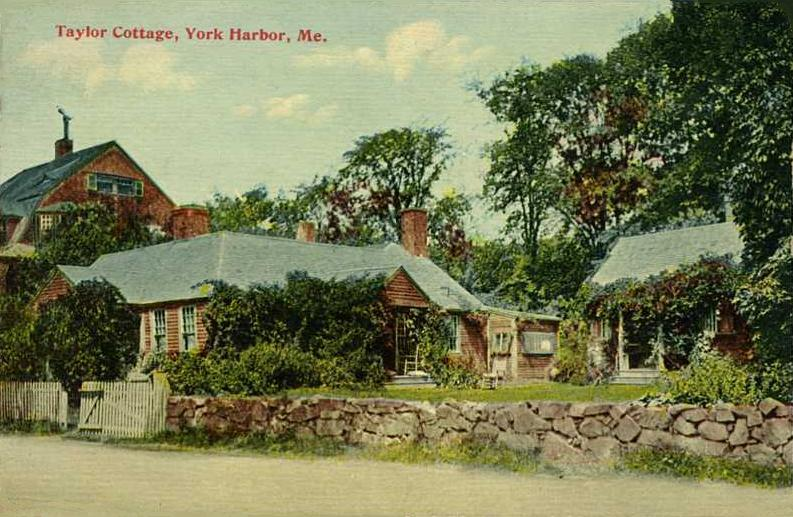
Taylor Cottage in 1913

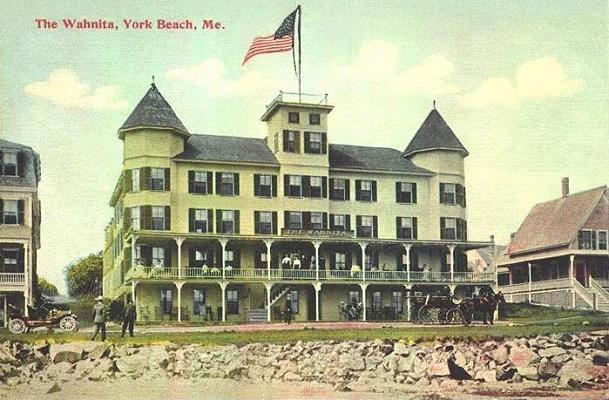
The Wahnita in 1913

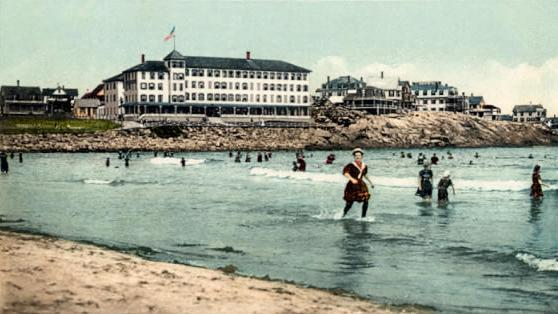
York Beach in 1906

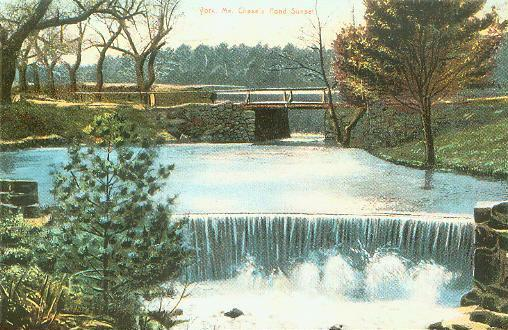
Chase's Pond in 1910

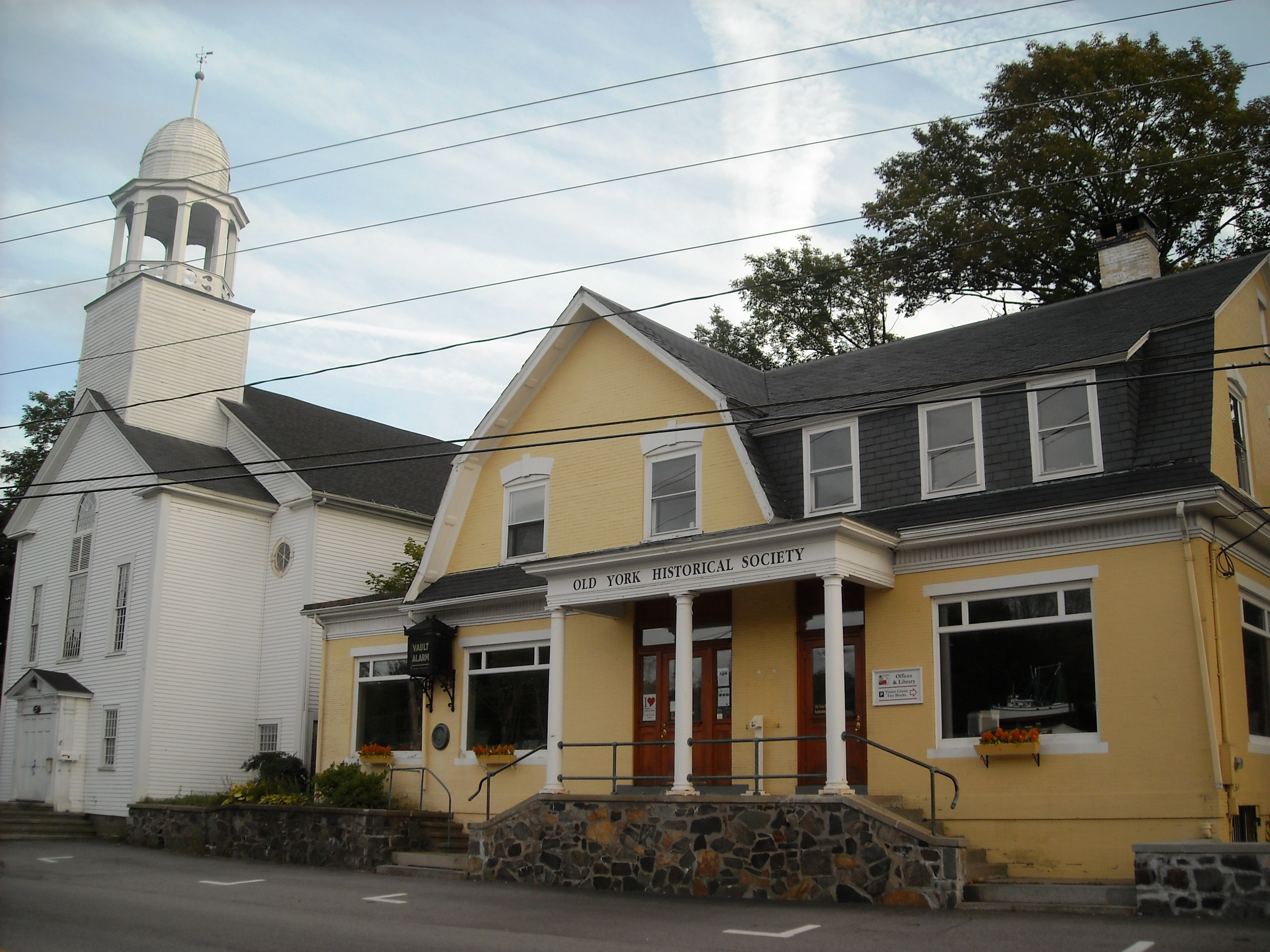
Research Center at Old York

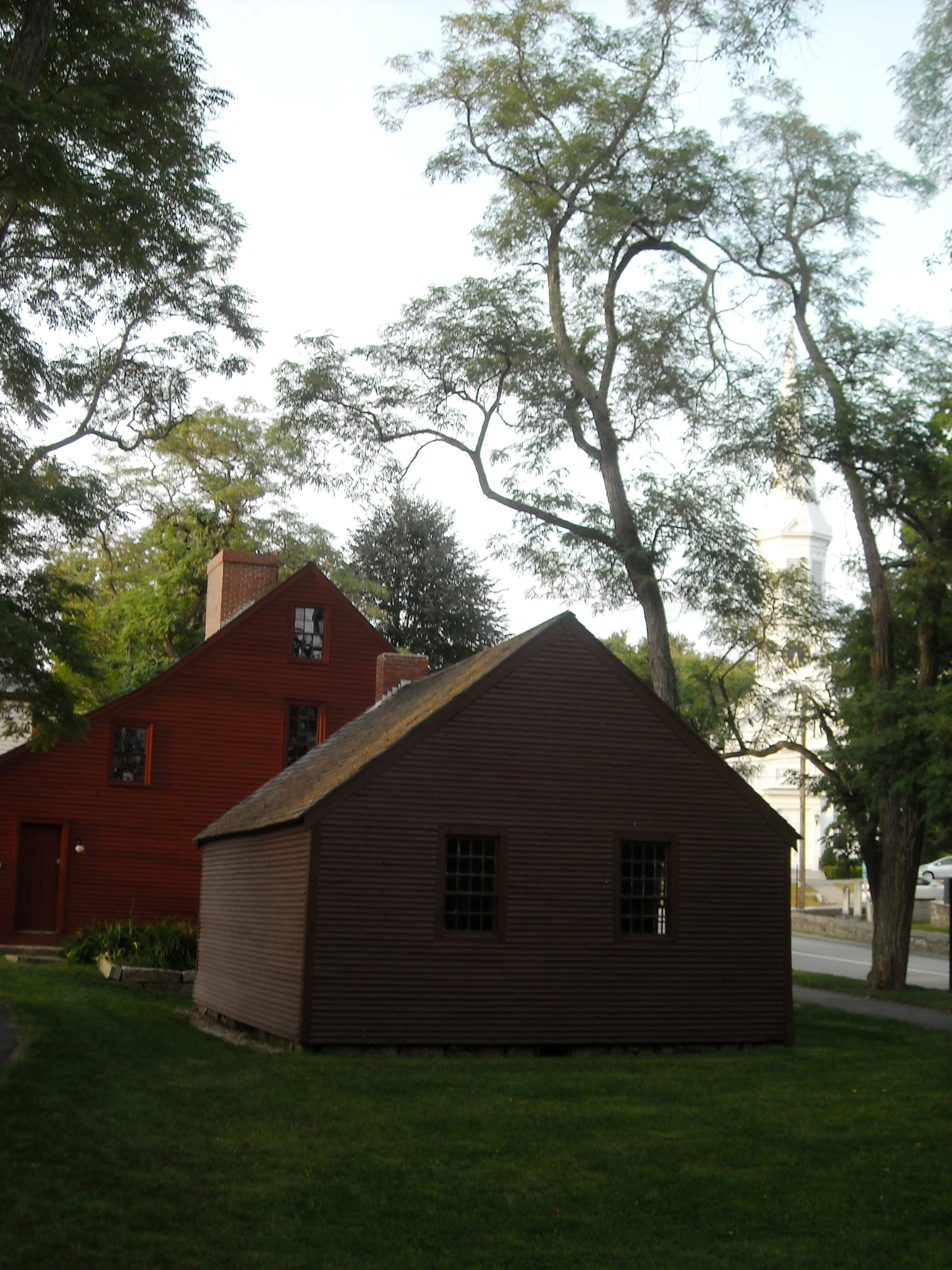
1834 Remick Barn (behind) and Old Schoolhouse (in front)

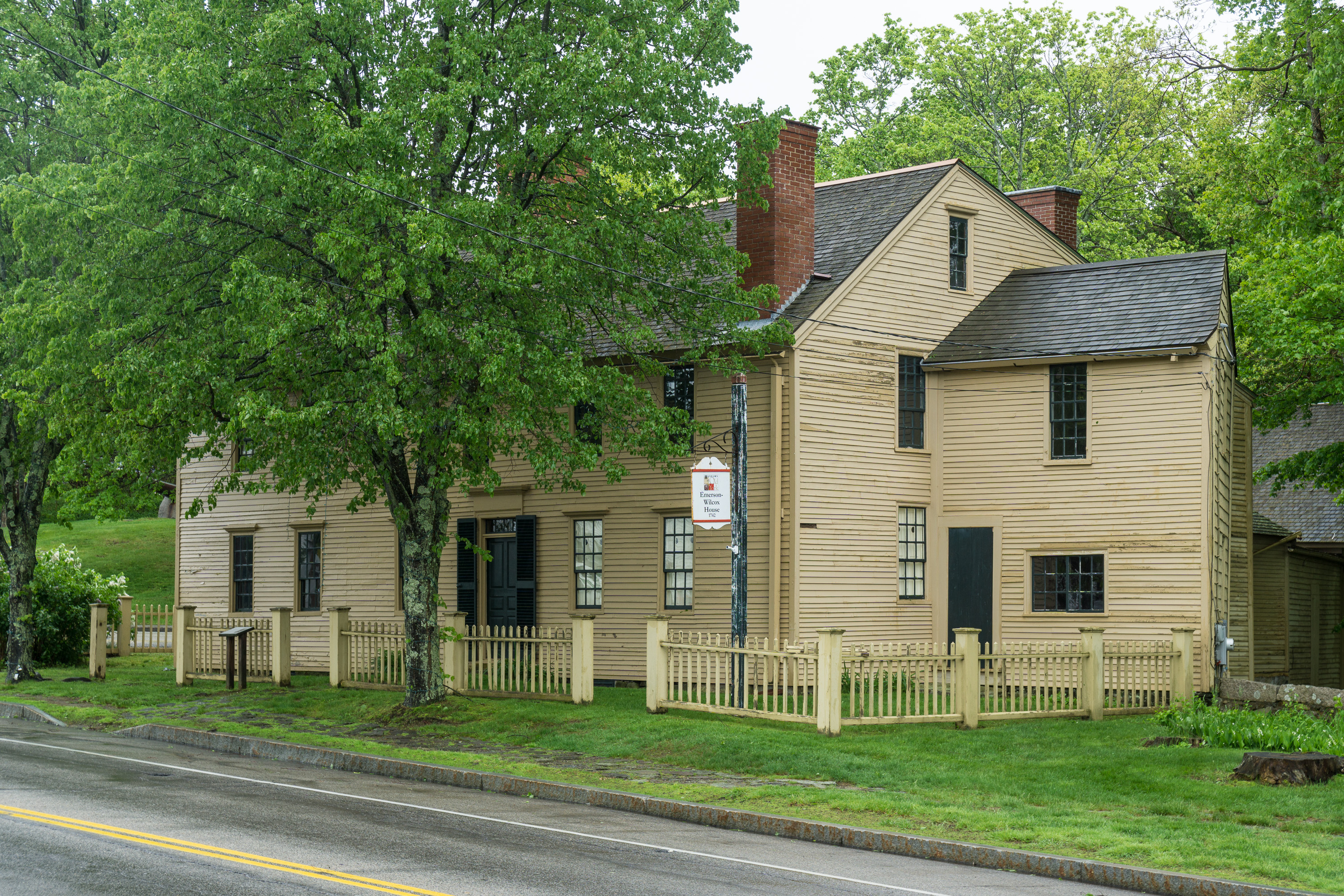
Emerson Wilcox House, 1742, Georgian style, served as a store, a post office and a tavern over time.

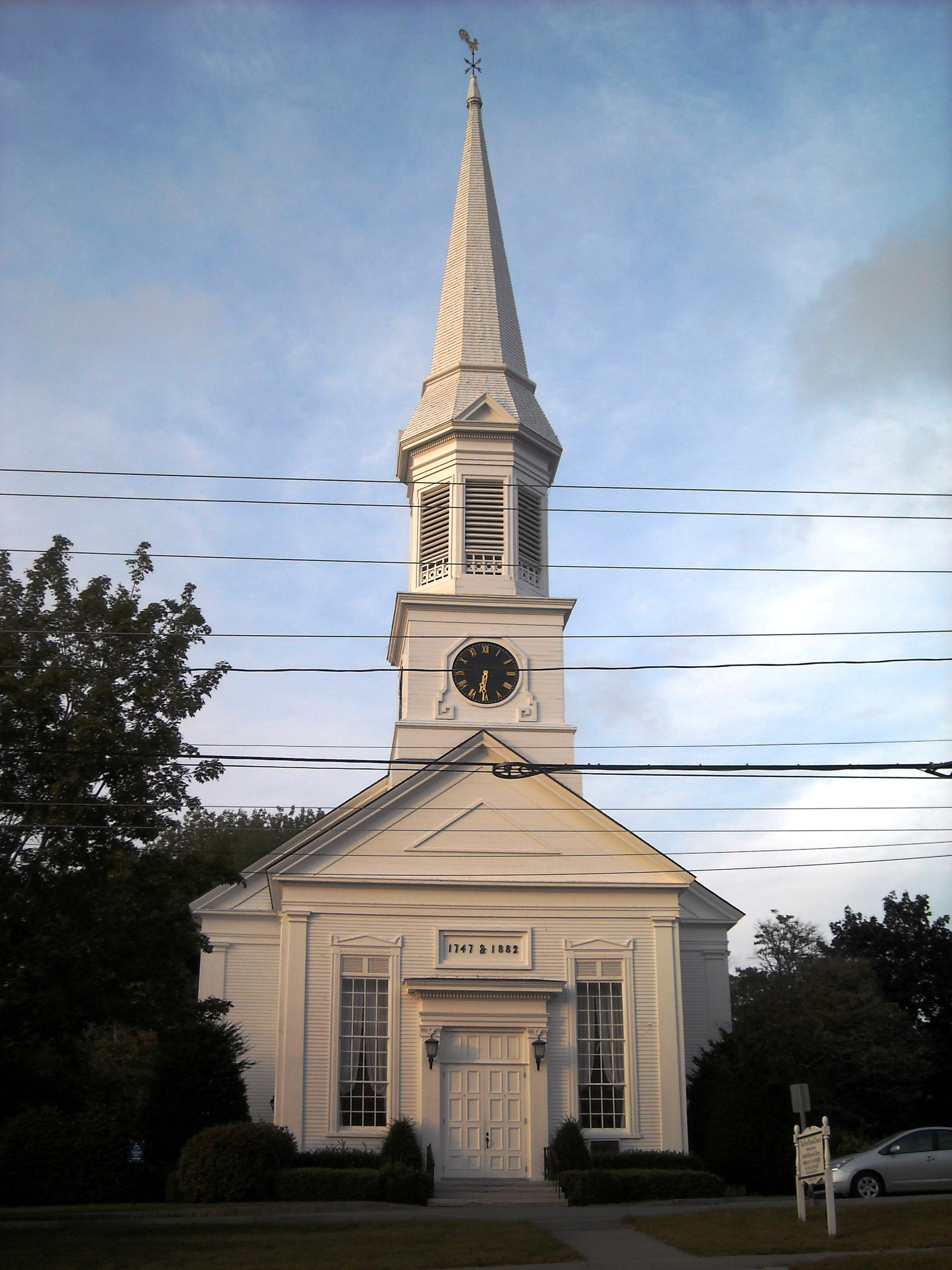
First Parish Church

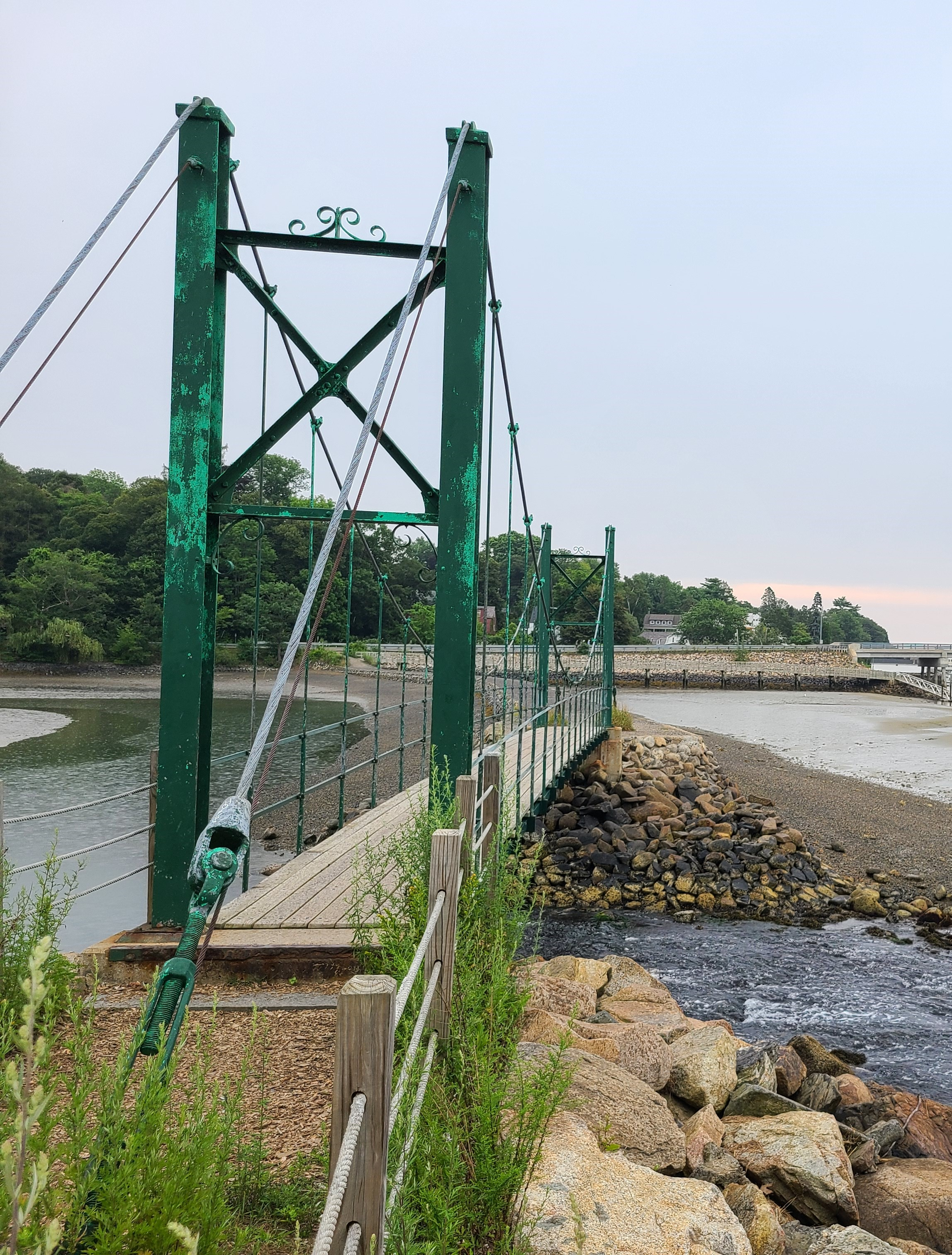
The Wiggly Bridge in York, Maine is the smallest pedestrian suspension bridge in the United States.
