= Old York Gaol =

- U.S. National Register of Historic Places
- U.S. National Historic Landmark
- U.S. Historic district – Contributing property
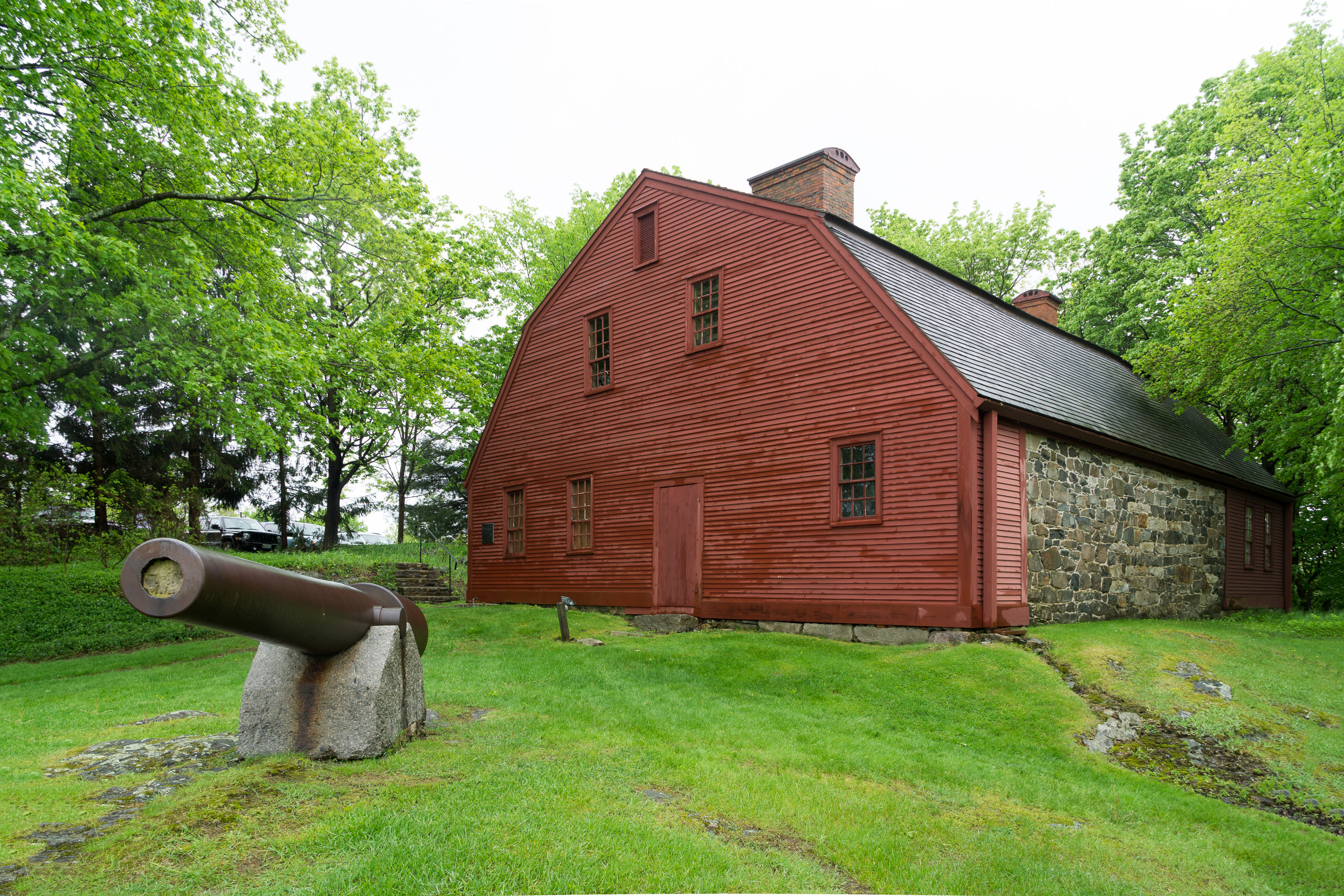

- Location within Maine Location within the United States
- Location: York, Maine
- Coordinates: 43.14375°N 70.65165°W
- Area: 0.5 acres (0.20 ha)
- Built: 1719
- Architectural style: American Colonial
- Part of: York Historic District (ID73000249)
- NRHP reference No.: 68000016

Significant dates
- Added to NRHP: November 24, 1968
- Designated NHL: November 24, 1968
- Designated CP: July 16, 1973

The Old York Gaol is a former colonial prison at Lindsay Road and Main Street (United States Route 1A) in York, Maine. Its oldest portion dating to about 1720, it is one of the oldest prison buildings in the United States, and one of the oldest public buildings in the state of Maine. It was designated a National Historic Landmark in 1968. It is owned by the Museums of Old York and is open for tours between May and October.

== Description and history ==
The gaol is a largely wood frame structure that has had a long evolutionary history of growth and change, and presently appears as a 1-1/2 story gambrel-roofed structure that is partial clapboarded, with sections of stone wall. The oldest portion of the building, dating to 1719 or 1720, is a stone cell block containing a single cell, with stone walls 2.5 feet (0.76 m) thick lined on the inside with oak planking. About 1736 several first-floor chambers were added, including a kitchen, dining room, and parlor space that has a folding partition wall (added late in the 19th century), so that it be divided into two separate rooms. In c. 1763 the second floor was added, with three cells and a central chamber. One of the cells, surmised to be intended for use as a debtor's cell or warden's room, is of noticeably finer quality. Around the turn of the 19th century a second stone cell was added to the first floor, along with an extension including a dining room, parlor, and bedchamber for the warden.

The original portion of the jail was constructed using timbers from the earlier York jail built in 1656. The building served as the official provincial jail for York County (then part of Massachusetts) until 1760, when it was turned over to the town of York. The building's last major enlargement was made in response to a demand for better conditions in debtor's prisons after an increase in debtors following the American Revolution. After 1879 the building was used as a school, warehouse, and boarding house until 1900 when it opened as a colonial museum of relics. The Old Gaol continues to be a museum and reflects the jail and jailer's quarters as they were in 1789.

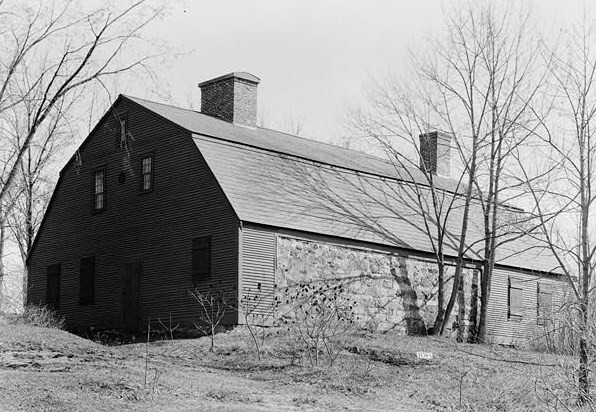
Old York Gaol in 1936

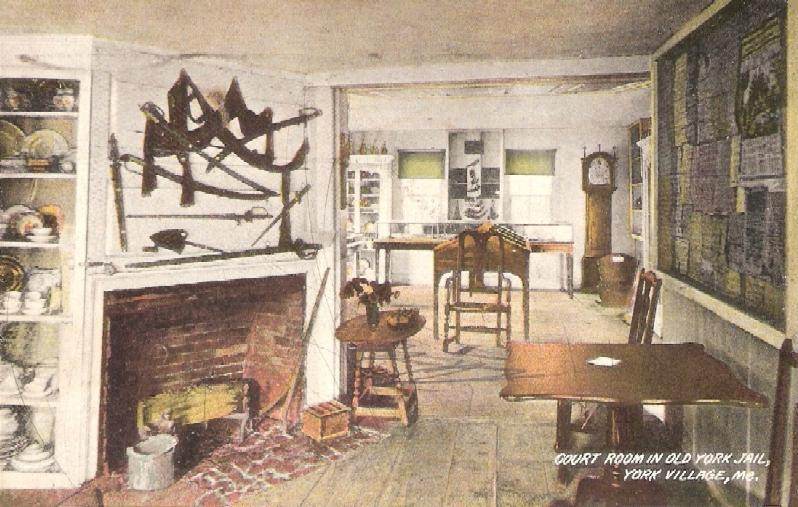
Courtroom in the Old Gaol (Jail) in c. 1910

== See also ==
- List of National Historic Landmarks in Maine
- List of the oldest buildings in Maine
- National Register of Historic Places listings in York County, Maine
