= York River (Maine) =

River in Maine, United States

Coordinates: 43°7′45″N 70°38′15″W

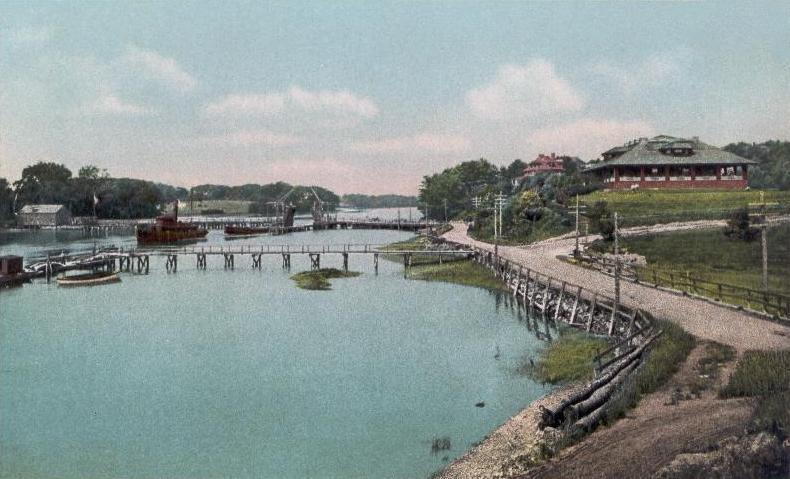
- York River in 1908

Location
- Country: United States
- State: Maine

National Wild and Scenic River
- Type: Recreational
- Designated: December 29, 2022

The York River is a 13-mile-long (21 km) stream in southeast Maine, United States. It is tidal for over half of its length. It rises at York Pond in Eliot, and conjoined by brooks and creeks, feeds the tidal section. The York River flows southeast to the Atlantic Ocean at York Harbor in the town of York.

The Abenaki name for the York River is Agamenticus, which means "Beyond-the-hill-little-cove". According to Eben Norton Horsford, Agamenticus "described the site of the mouth of Little York River to one approaching it from the north, as it lay behind the hill called by the Indians "Sassanows" (the modern Agamenticus). Little York River, a short tidal river, was the "Beyond-the-hill-little-cove."

== Legislation ==
On May 23, 2013, Rep Chellie Pingree introduced the York River Wild and Scenic River Study Act of 2013 (H.R. 2197; 113th Congress) would have required the National Park Service to study a segment of the York River for potential addition to the Wild and Scenic Rivers System. The study would be to determine how the proposed designation would affect current recreational and commercial activities.

The 2023 federal government funding bill (Consolidated Appropriations Act, 2023) designated the York River as part of the National Wild and Scenic Rivers System. A stewardship committee will be created to manage more than 30 miles of the river and land around it.
