= 1860 United States presidential election in Maine =

- November 2, 1860
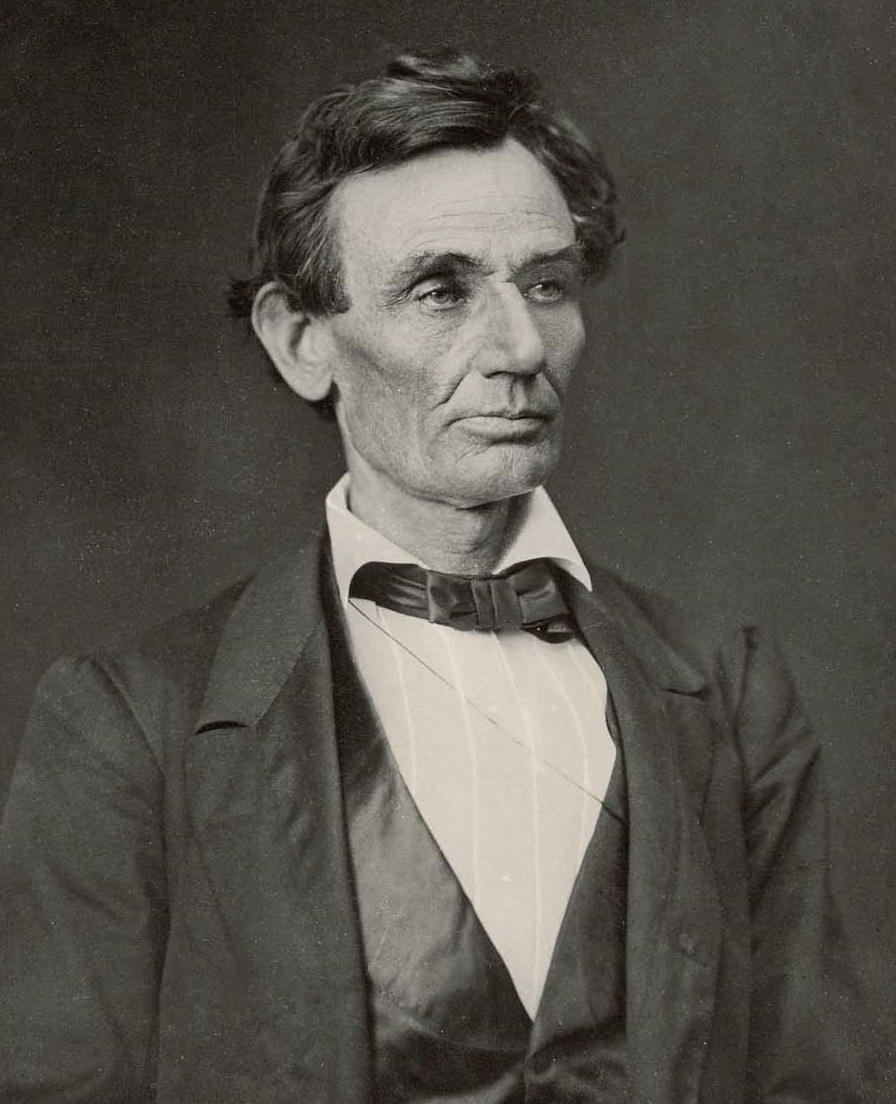

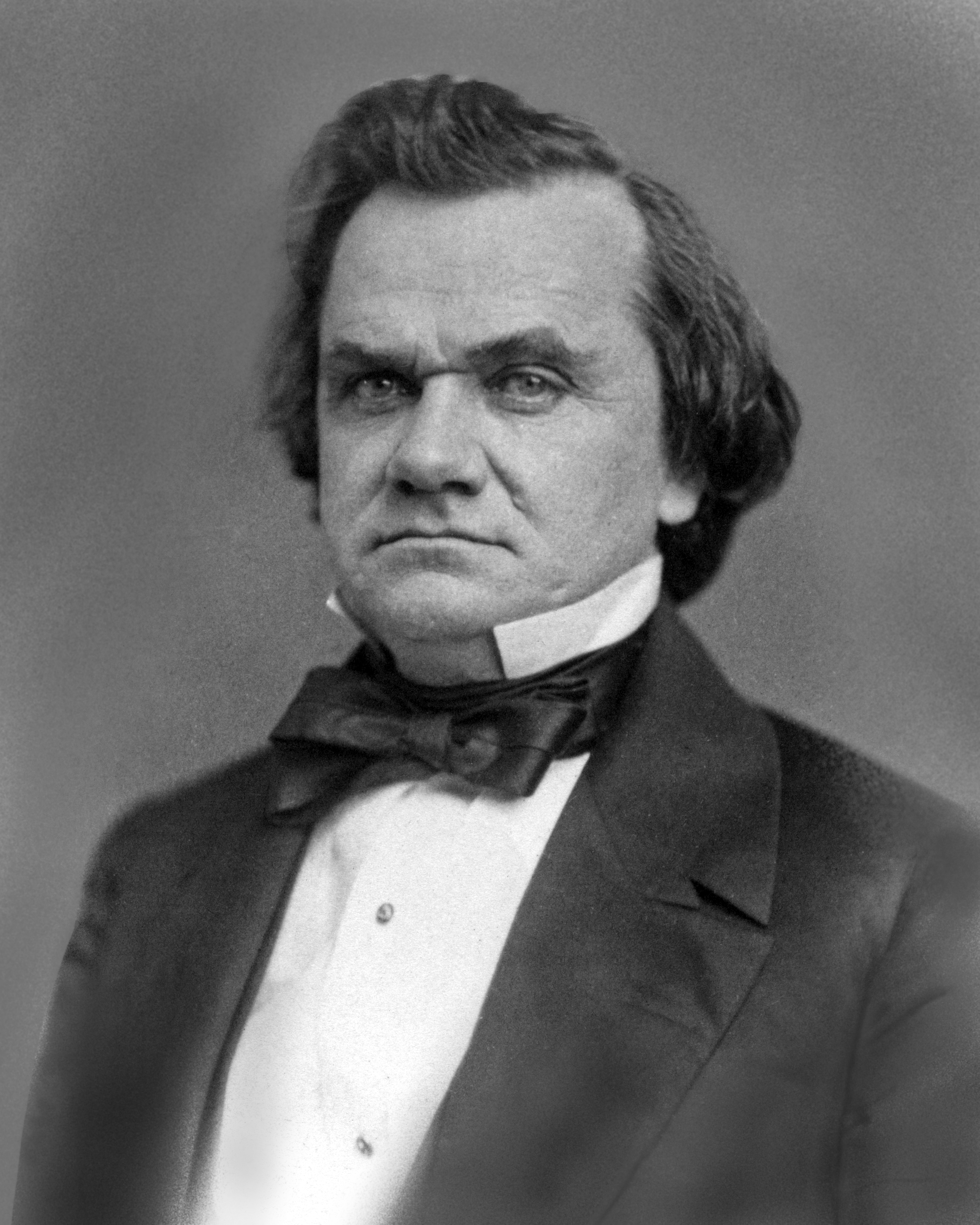

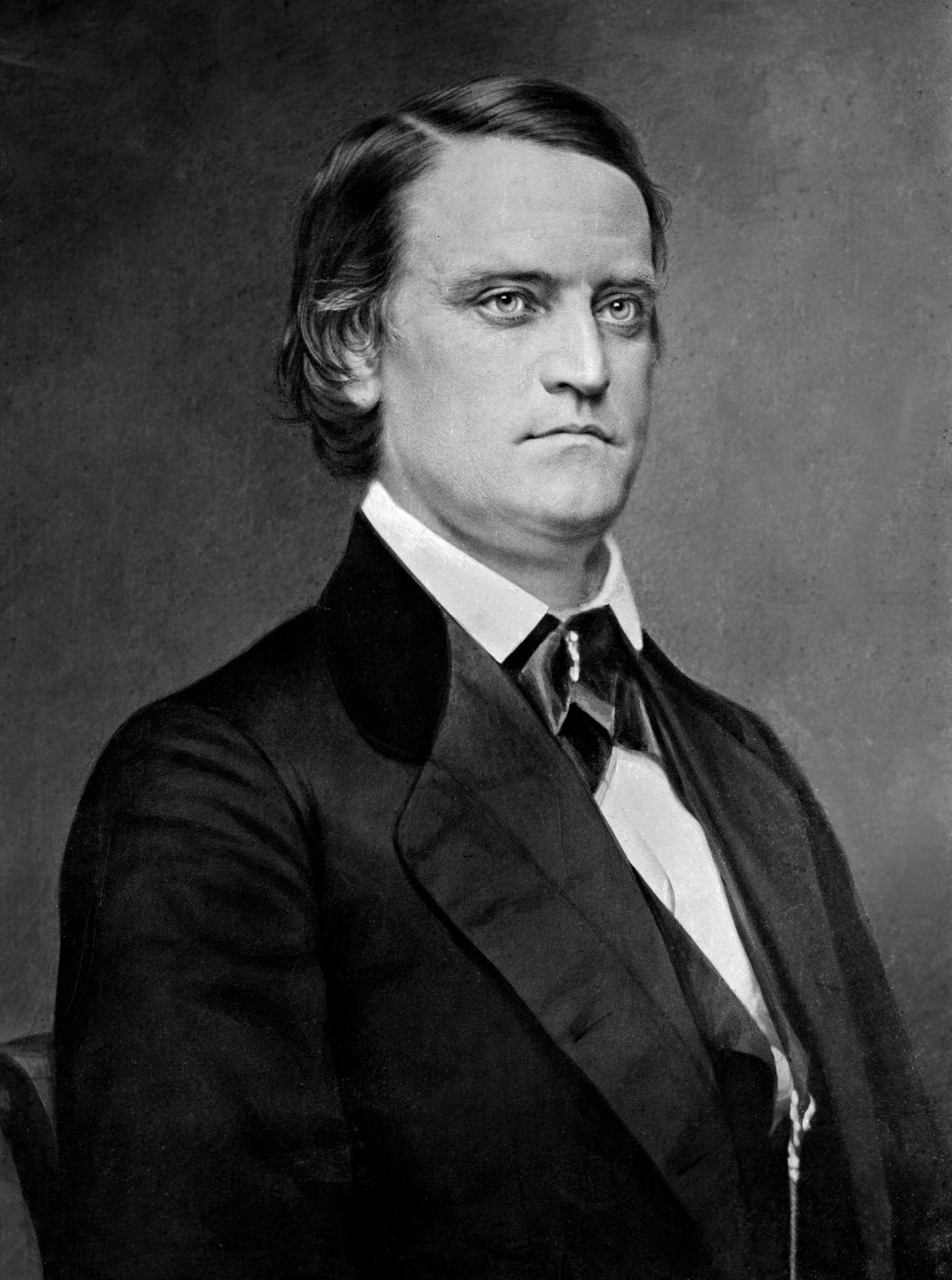
Nominee	Abraham Lincoln	Stephen A. Douglas	John C. Breckinridge
Party	Republican	Democratic	Southern Democratic
Home state	Illinois	Illinois	Kentucky
Running mate	Hannibal Hamlin	Herschel V. Johnson	Joseph Lane
Electoral vote	8	0	0
Popular vote	62,811	29,693	6,368
Percentage	62.24%	29.42%	6.31%
County results
Lincoln
50–60%
60–70%
70–80%
President before election
James Buchanan
Democratic
Elected President
Abraham Lincoln
Republican

The 1860 United States presidential election in Maine took place on November 2, 1860, as part of the 1860 United States presidential election. Voters chose eight electors of the Electoral College, who voted for president and vice president.

Maine was won by Republican candidate Abraham Lincoln, who won by a margin of 32.82%.

With 62.24% of the popular vote, Maine would prove to be Lincoln's fourth strongest state in terms of popular vote percentage after Vermont, Minnesota and Massachusetts.

== Results ==
1860 United States presidential election in Maine
Party	Candidate	Running mate	Popular vote		Electoral vote	
Party	Candidate	Running mate	Count	%	Count	%
Republican	Abraham Lincoln of Illinois	Hannibal Hamlin of Maine	62,811	62.24%	8	100.00%
Democratic	Stephen A. Douglas of Illinois	Herschel Vespasian Johnson of Georgia	29,693	29.42%	0	0.00%
Southern Democratic	John Cabell Breckinridge of Kentucky	Joseph Lane of Oregon	6,368	6.31%	0	0.00%
Constitutional Union	John Bell of Tennessee	Edward Everett of Massachusetts	2,046	2.03%	0	0.00%
Total			100,918	100.00%	8	100.00%

=== Results By County ===
1860 United States Presidential Election in Maine (by county)
County	Abraham Lincoln Republican		Stephen A. Douglas Democratic		John C. Breckinridge Southern Democratic		John Bell Constitutional Union		Total votes cast
County	#	%	#	%	#	%	#	%	Total votes cast
Androscoggin	3,526	64.35%	1,838	33.55%	65	1.19%	50	0.91%	5,479
Aroostook	1,142	66.01%	414	23.93%	167	9.65%	7	0.40%	1,730
Cumberland	7,934	59.04%	4,815	35.83%	345	2.57%	345	2.57%	13,439
Franklin	2,281	61.68%	1,358	36.72%	56	1.51%	3	0.08%	3,698
Hancock	3,322	60.35%	932	16.93%	1,062	19.29%	189	3.43%	5,505
Kennebec	6,599	70.90%	2,353	25.28%	156	1.68%	200	2.15%	9,308
Knox	2,520	54.83%	1,825	39.71%	183	3.98%	68	1.48%	4,596
Lincoln	2,510	61.82%	1,073	26.43%	210	5.17%	267	6.58%	4,060
Oxford	4,244	60.78%	2,523	36.14%	199	2.85%	16	0.23%	6,982
Penobscot	6,997	65.06%	1,555	14.46%	2,018	18.76%	185	1.72%	10,755
Piscataquis	1,656	67.73%	401	16.40%	374	15.30%	14	0.57%	2,445
Sagadahoc	2,257	68.29%	630	19.06%	142	4.30%	276	8.35%	3,305
Somerset	4,048	64.59%	1,833	29.25%	212	3.38%	174	2.78%	6,267
Waldo	3,800	64.90%	1,434	24.49%	537	9.17%	84	1.43%	5,855
Washington	3,515	56.17%	2,320	37.07%	348	5.56%	75	1.20%	6,258
York	6,460	57.49%	4,389	39.06%	294	2.62%	93	0.83%	11,236
Total	62,811	62.24%	29,693	29.42%	6,368	6.31%	2,046	2.03%	100,918

== See also ==
- United States presidential elections in Maine
