= 2000 United States presidential election in Maine =

- November 7, 2000

Nominee	Al Gore	George W. Bush	Ralph Nader
Party	Democratic	Republican	Green
Home state	Tennessee	Texas	Connecticut
Running mate	Joe Lieberman	Dick Cheney	Winona LaDuke
Electoral vote	4	0	0
Popular vote	319,951	286,616	37,127
Percentage	49.09%	43.97%	5.70%

Gore
40–50%
50–60%
60–70%
70–80%
80–90%
Bush
40–50%
50–60%
60–70%
70–80%
80–90%
90–100%
Tie
President before election
Bill Clinton
Democratic
Elected President
George W. Bush
Republican

The 2000 United States presidential election in Maine took place on November 7, 2000, and was part of the 2000 United States presidential election. Maine is one of two U.S. states, where, instead of all of the state's four electors of the Electoral College voting based on the statewide results of the voters, two electors vote based on their respective congressional district. The other two electors vote based on the statewide results.

Vice President Al Gore, the Democratic nominee, won the state with 49.09% of the vote over Republican Governor of Texas George W. Bush, who received 43.97%. As of the 2024 presidential election, this is the last election in which Waldo County and Lincoln County voted for the Republican candidate.

Bush was the first Republican to win election without winning the state since Richard Nixon in 1968, as well as the first ever to do so without Hancock County, and the first to do so without Knox County since William McKinley in 1900.

Maine was one of ten states that backed George H. W. Bush for president in 1988 that did not back George W. Bush in either 2000 or 2004.

== General election ==
=== Polling ===
Poll source	Date(s)	Sample size	Margin of error	George W. Bush (R)	Al Gore (D)	Ralph Nader (G)	Other / undecided (Note: Calculated by taking the difference of 100% and all other listed candidates combined. For polls that do not report a figure for Nader, this includes his support.)
Harris Insights & Analytics	November 3, 2000	1,485	—	42%	50%	6%	2%
RKM Research and Communications Inc.	October 29, 2000	602	—	42%	42%	4%	12%
Market Decisions Research	October 24, 2000	824	—	41%	42%	5%	12%
Myers Research & Strategic Services	October 22, 2000	400	—	34%	42%	5%	19%
Pan Atlantic Research	October 22, 2000	400	—	36%	47%	—	17%
Rasmussen Reports	October 22, 2000	1,548	—	43%	39%	—	18%

=== Results ===
2000 United States presidential election in Maine
Party	Candidate	Votes	Percentage	Electoral votes
Democratic	Al Gore	319,951	49.09%	4
Republican	George W. Bush	286,616	43.97%	0
Green	Ralph Nader	37,127	5.70%	0
Reform	Pat Buchanan	4,443	0.68%	0
Libertarian	Harry Browne	3,074	0.47%	0
Constitution	Howard Phillips	579	0.09%	0
Write-in		27	<0.01%	—
Totals		651,817	100.00%	4
Voter turnout		67%		-5%

==== By county ====
County	Al Gore Democratic		George W. Bush Republican		Ralph Nader Green		Various candidates Other parties		Margin		Total votes cast
County	#	%	#	%	#	%	#	%	#	%	Total votes cast
Androscoggin	26,251	53.31%	19,948	40.51%	2,388	4.85%	658	1.34%	6,303	12.80%	49,245
Aroostook	17,196	48.93%	16,555	47.11%	1,055	3.00%	337	0.96%	641	1.82%	35,143
Cumberland	74,203	52.03%	58,543	41.05%	8,576	6.01%	1,298	0.91%	15,660	10.98%	142,620
Franklin	7,593	49.15%	6,459	41.81%	1,115	7.22%	281	1.82%	1,134	7.34%	15,448
Hancock	12,983	45.44%	12,732	44.56%	2,513	8.79%	346	1.21%	251	0.88%	28,574
Kennebec	31,198	52.96%	23,967	40.69%	2,955	5.02%	787	1.34%	7,231	12.28%	58,907
Knox	9,453	46.11%	8,968	43.74%	1,810	8.83%	270	1.32%	485	2.37%	20,501
Lincoln	8,634	43.89%	9,457	48.08%	1,323	6.73%	257	1.31%	-823	-4.18%	19,671
Oxford	13,649	49.65%	11,835	43.05%	1,509	5.49%	500	1.82%	1,814	6.60%	27,493
Penobscot	32,868	44.90%	35,620	48.66%	3,772	5.15%	946	1.29%	-2,752	-3.76%	73,206
Piscataquis	3,745	40.46%	4,845	52.34%	471	5.09%	195	2.11%	-1,100	-11.88%	9,256
Sagadahoc	8,844	48.05%	8,052	43.75%	1,278	6.94%	232	1.26%	792	4.30%	18,406
Somerset	11,538	48.17%	10,684	44.61%	1,239	5.17%	490	2.05%	854	3.57%	23,951
Waldo	8,477	44.29%	8,689	45.40%	1,690	8.83%	282	1.47%	-212	-1.11%	19,138
Washington	6,701	42.66%	7,958	50.66%	802	5.11%	247	1.57%	-1,257	-8.00%	15,708
York	46,618	49.31%	42,304	44.74%	4,631	4.90%	997	1.05%	4,314	4.56%	94,550
Total	319,951	49.09%	286,616	43.97%	37,127	5.70%	8,123	1.25%	33,335	5.12%	651,817

Counties that flipped from Democratic to Republican

- Lincoln (largest city: Waldoboro)
- Penobscot (largest city: Bangor)
- Piscataquis (largest city: Dover-Foxcroft)
- Waldo (largest city: Belfast)
- Washington (largest city: Calais)

==== By congressional districts ====
Gore won both congressional districts.

District	Gore	Bush	Representative
1st	50.52%	42.59%	Tom Allen
2nd	47.43%	45.56%	John Baldacci

== See also ==
- United States presidential elections in Maine
