= 1920 United States presidential election in Maine =

- November 2, 1920
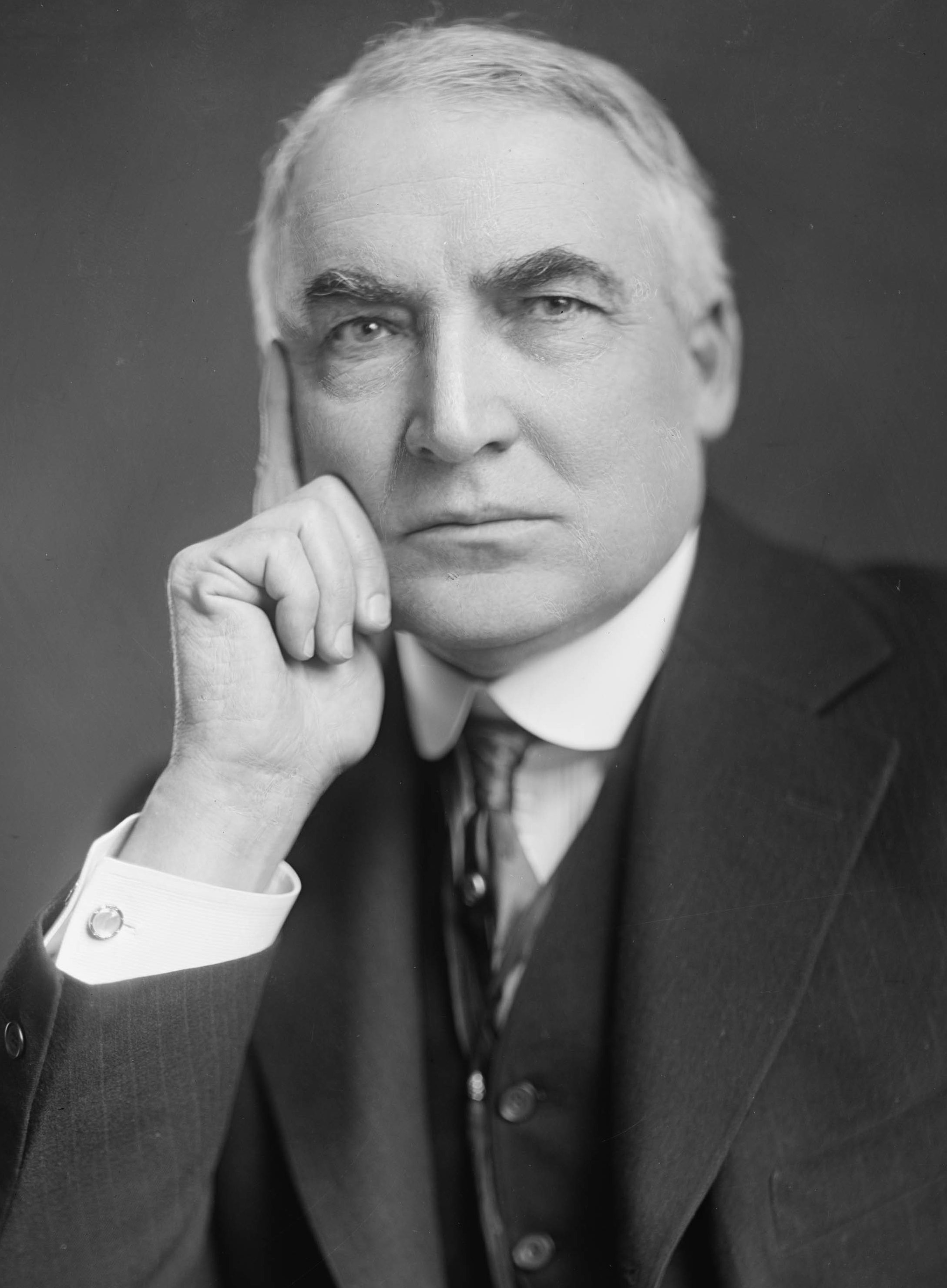

Nominee	Warren G. Harding	James M. Cox
Party	Republican	Democratic
Home state	Ohio	Ohio
Running mate	Calvin Coolidge	Franklin D. Roosevelt
Electoral vote	6	0
Popular vote	136,355	58,961
Percentage	68.92%	29.80%
County results
Harding
60–70%
70–80%
80–90%
President before election
Woodrow Wilson
Democratic
Elected President
Warren G. Harding
Republican

The 1920 United States presidential election in Maine took place on November 2, 1920, as part of the 1920 United States presidential election which was held throughout all contemporary 48 states. Voters chose six representatives, or electors to the Electoral College, who voted for president and vice president.

Maine voted for Republican nominee, Senator Warren G. Harding of Ohio, over the Democratic nominee, Governor James M. Cox of Ohio. Harding ran with Governor Calvin Coolidge of Massachusetts, while Cox ran with Assistant Secretary of the Navy Franklin D. Roosevelt of New York.

Harding won Maine by a margin of 39.12%. His victory in the New England states was helped in by the local popularity of his running mate, Calvin Coolidge, a traditional New England Yankee born in the small-town of Plymouth Notch, Vermont, who had started his political career nearby as Governor of Massachusetts. Harding's 88.48% of the vote that he received in Aroostook County is the best ever performance for any candidate in any county in Maine since 1824.

== Results ==
1920 United States presidential election in Maine
Party	Candidate	Running mate	Popular vote		Electoral vote	
Party	Candidate	Running mate	Count	%	Count	%
Republican	Warren Gamaliel Harding of Ohio	Calvin Coolidge of Massachusetts	136,355	68.92%	6	100.00%
Democratic	James Middleton Cox of Ohio	Franklin Delano Roosevelt of New York	58,961	29.80%	0	0.00%
Socialist	Eugene Victor Debs of Indiana	Seymour Stedman of Illinois	2,214	1.12%	0	0.00%
Single Tax	Robert Colvin Macauley	Richard C. Barnum	310	0.16%	0	0.00%
Total			197,840	100.00%	6	100.00%

=== Results by county ===
County	Warren Gamaliel Harding Republican		James Middleton Cox Democratic		Eugene Victor Debs Socialist		Robert Colvin Macauley Single Tax		Margin		Total votes cast
County	#	%	#	%	#	%	#	%	#	%	Total votes cast
Androscoggin	9,565	60.83%	5,757	36.61%	290	1.84%	112	0.71%	3,808	24.22%	15,724
Aroostook	11,191	88.48%	1,407	11.12%	36	0.28%	14	0.11%	9,784	77.36%	12,648
Cumberland	24,623	69.19%	10,484	29.46%	434	1.22%	44	0.12%	14,139	39.73%	35,585
Franklin	3,820	69.13%	1,668	30.18%	33	0.60%	5	0.09%	2,152	38.95%	5,526
Hancock	5,604	71.68%	2,154	27.55%	55	0.70%	5	0.06%	3,450	44.13%	7,818
Kennebec	12,333	68.62%	5,466	30.41%	154	0.86%	20	0.11%	6,867	38.21%	17,973
Knox	4,979	60.85%	2,971	36.31%	221	2.70%	12	0.15%	2,008	24.54%	8,183
Lincoln	3,668	73.61%	1,256	25.21%	58	1.16%	1	0.02%	2,412	48.40%	4,983
Oxford	7,301	64.59%	3,906	34.55%	89	0.79%	8	0.07%	3,395	30.04%	11,304
Penobscot	14,145	69.35%	6,110	29.95%	126	0.62%	17	0.08%	8,035	39.40%	20,398
Piscataquis	4,049	68.79%	1,788	30.38%	31	0.53%	18	0.31%	2,261	38.41%	5,886
Sagadahoc	3,857	68.36%	1,709	30.29%	73	1.29%	3	0.05%	2,148	38.07%	5,642
Somerset	6,533	68.11%	2,770	28.88%	275	2.87%	14	0.15%	3,763	39.23%	9,592
Waldo	4,383	71.52%	1,666	27.19%	73	1.19%	6	0.10%	2,717	44.33%	6,128
Washington	6,768	68.57%	2,997	30.36%	85	0.86%	20	0.20%	3,771	38.21%	9,870
York	13,536	65.77%	6,852	33.29%	177	0.86%	15	0.07%	6,684	32.48%	20,580
Totals	136,355	68.92%	58,961	29.80%	2,210	1.12%	314	0.16%	77,394	39.12%	197,840

== See also ==
- United States presidential elections in Maine
