= 1896 United States presidential election in Maine =

- November 3, 1896

Nominee	William McKinley	William Jennings Bryan
Party	Republican	Democratic
Alliance		Populist
Home state	Ohio	Nebraska
Running mate	Garret Hobart	Arthur Sewall
Electoral vote	6	0
Popular vote	80,403	34,587
Percentage	67.90%	29.21%
County results
McKinley
60–70%
70–80%
President before election
Grover Cleveland
Democratic
Elected President
William McKinley
Republican

The 1896 United States presidential election in Maine took place on November 3, 1896, as part of the 1896 United States presidential election. Voters chose six representatives, or electors to the Electoral College, who voted for president and vice president.

Maine voted for the Republican nominee, former governor of Ohio William McKinley, over the Democratic nominee, former U.S. Representative from Nebraska William Jennings Bryan. McKinley won the state by a margin of 38.69%.

Bryan, running on a platform of free silver, appealed strongly to Western miners and farmers, but had little appeal in the Northeastern states such as Maine, despite the fact he had chosen the Maine born Arthur Sewall as running mate.

With 67.90% of the popular vote, Maine would be McKinley's fifth strongest victory in terms of percentage in the popular vote after Vermont, Massachusetts, neighboring New Hampshire and Rhode Island.

Bryan would lose Maine to McKinley again four years later and would later lose the state again in 1908 to William Howard Taft.

== Results ==
1896 United States presidential election in Maine
Party	Candidate	Votes	Percentage	Electoral votes
Republican	William McKinley	80,403	67.90%	6
Democratic	William Jennings Bryan	32,200	27.19%	0
Populist	William Jennings Bryan	2,387	2.02%	0
Total	William Jennings Bryan	34,587	29.21%	0
National Democratic	John M. Palmer	1,867	1.58%	0
Prohibition	Joshua Levering	1,562	1.32%	0
Totals		118,419	100.00%	6
Voter turnout				—

=== Results by county ===
County	William McKinley Republican		William Jennings Bryan Democratic		John McAuley Palmer National Democratic		Joshua Levering Prohibition		Margin		Total votes cast
County	#	%	#	%	#	%	#	%	#	%	Total votes cast
Androscoggin	5,548	66.61%	2,513	30.17%	157	1.88%	111	1.33%	3,035	36.44%	8,329
Aroostook	4,816	74.41%	1,383	21.37%	42	0.65%	231	3.57%	3,433	53.04%	6,472
Cumberland	11,017	65.32%	5,175	30.68%	450	2.67%	224	1.33%	5,842	34.64%	16,866
Franklin	2,578	72.60%	886	24.95%	49	1.38%	38	1.07%	1,692	47.65%	3,551
Hancock	4,306	68.69%	1,795	28.63%	117	1.87%	51	0.81%	2,511	40.06%	6,269
Kennebec	7,889	71.70%	2,817	25.60%	106	0.96%	191	1.74%	5,072	46.10%	11,003
Knox	3,286	61.72%	1,900	35.69%	103	1.93%	35	0.66%	1,386	26.03%	5,324
Lincoln	2,596	66.46%	1,211	31.00%	62	1.59%	37	0.95%	1,385	35.46%	3,906
Oxford	4,779	71.52%	1,677	25.10%	159	2.38%	67	1.00%	3,102	46.42%	6,682
Penobscot	8,414	66.42%	4,031	31.82%	90	0.71%	133	1.05%	4,383	34.60%	12,668
Piscataquis	2,342	70.37%	904	27.16%	36	1.08%	46	1.38%	1,438	43.21%	3,328
Sagadahoc	2,725	71.60%	957	25.14%	79	2.08%	45	1.18%	1,768	46.46%	3,806
Somerset	4,695	68.12%	2,018	29.28%	82	1.19%	97	1.41%	2,677	38.84%	6,892
Waldo	3,253	61.68%	1,939	36.77%	50	0.95%	32	0.61%	1,314	24.91%	5,274
Washington	4,627	68.93%	1,925	28.68%	111	1.65%	50	0.74%	2,702	40.25%	6,713
York	7,532	66.44%	3,456	30.49%	174	1.53%	174	1.53%	4,076	35.95%	11,336
Totals	80,403	67.90%	34,587	29.21%	1,867	1.58%	1,562	1.32%	45,816	38.69%	118,419

== See also ==
- United States presidential elections in Maine
