= 2012 United States presidential election in Maine =

- November 6, 2012

Nominee	Barack Obama	Mitt Romney
Party	Democratic	Republican
Home state	Illinois	Massachusetts
Running mate	Joe Biden	Paul Ryan
Electoral vote	4	0
Popular vote	401,306	292,276
Percentage	56.27%	40.98%

Obama
40–50%
50–60%
60–70%
70–80%
80–90%
90–100%
Romney
40–50%
50–60%
60–70%
70–80%
80–90%
90–100%
Write-in
90–100%
Tie
President before election
Barack Obama
Democratic
Elected President
Barack Obama
Democratic

The 2012 United States presidential election in Maine took place on November 6, 2012, as part of the 2012 United States presidential election in which all 50 states plus the District of Columbia participated. Maine voters chose four electors to represent them in the Electoral College via a popular vote pitting incumbent Democratic President Barack Obama and his running mate, Vice President Joe Biden, against Republican challenger and former Massachusetts Governor Mitt Romney and his running mate, Congressman Paul Ryan. Obama and Biden carried Maine with 56.27% of the popular vote to Romney's and Ryan's 40.98%, thus winning the state's four electoral votes.

As of the 2024 presidential election, this is the last election that the Democratic candidate won Maine's second congressional district along with a majority of counties in the state, as well as these counties (all of which comprise that district): Androscoggin, Aroostook, Franklin, Oxford, Penobscot, Somerset, and Washington. This is also the last election in which Maine was won by double digits.

== Caucuses ==
=== Republican caucuses ===
The Republican caucuses were held between Sunday, January 29, and Saturday, March 3, at various locations throughout the state of Maine. Presidential preference polls (straw polls) were held at the caucuses, but those polls were not binding on the choices of delegates to the Maine Republican Party convention. The caucuses chose delegates in processes separate from the straw polling.

The state party encouraged all municipal committees to hold their caucuses between February 4 and February 11, although each committee was free to choose a different date. The first caucus was in Waldo County on January 29 and the last one in Castine (Hancock County) on March 3. On Saturday, February 11, after 84% of precincts had completed voting, state-party officials announced results of straw polls. The results were revised in a second declaration on February 17 to include previously missing results from several caucuses. Those statewide totals still did not include the caucuses in Washington County, which had been scheduled for February 11 but postponed to February 18 by predictions of bad weather, nor did they include caucuses originally scheduled to occur between February 16 and March 3. The state Republican Party issued a third statewide compilation on February 24, adding all the February 18 caucuses (scheduled and postponed), but not those for February 16 or March 3. All three statewide totals showed former Governor Mitt Romney leading Representative Ron Paul by small margins, with other candidates well behind.

At the State Convention held over the weekend of May 5–6, Ron Paul won 20 out of 24 national delegates. One elected delegate, Governor Paul LePage was uncommitted. Of the three delegates qualified by the party offices they already hold, the state party chairman, Charlie Webster was also uncommitted, while the then National Committeeman and Committeewoman committed to Mitt Romney.

Updated results were released by the Maine GOP on February 24. The new table does not show returns from Rome on February 16 or Castine on March 3, but does include returns from the towns listed above for February 18.

Maine Republican caucuses, 2012
Candidate	Votes (Feb. 11 count)	Votes (Feb. 17 count)	Votes (Feb. 24 count)	Percent (Feb. 11 count)	Percent (Feb. 17 count)	Percent (Feb. 24 count)	Projected Delegates			Chosen at State Convention
Candidate	Votes (Feb. 11 count)	Votes (Feb. 17 count)	Votes (Feb. 24 count)	Percent (Feb. 11 count)	Percent (Feb. 17 count)	Percent (Feb. 24 count)	GP	CNN	AP	Chosen at State Convention
Mitt Romney	2,190	2,269	2,373	39.2%	39.0%	38.0%	10	9	11	0
Ron Paul	1,996	2,030	2,258	35.7%	34.9%	36.1%	8	9	10	20
Rick Santorum	989	1,052	1,136	17.7%	18.1%	18.2%	4	3	0	0
Newt Gingrich	349	391	405	6.2%	6.7%	6.5%	1	0	0	0
Others & undecided	61	72	78	1.1%	1.2%	1.2%	0	0	0	1
Total:	5,585	5,814	6,250	100.0%	100.0%	100.0%	21	21	21	21
Ex officio delegates (not chosen through caucus process):							1	3	3	3
Total Maine delegates to the Republican National Convention:							24	24	24	24

== General election ==
=== Predictions ===
Source	Ranking	As of
Huffington Post	Safe D	November 6, 2012
CNN	Safe D	November 6, 2012
New York Times	Safe D	November 6, 2012
Washington Post	Safe D	November 6, 2012
RealClearPolitics	Lean D	November 6, 2012
Sabato's Crystal Ball	Likely D	November 5, 2012
FiveThirtyEight	Solid D	November 6, 2012

Source	1st district	2nd district	As of
New York Times	Safe D	Lean D	November 6, 2012
Sabato's Crystal Ball	Safe D	Lean D	November 5, 2012

=== Results ===
2012 United States presidential election in Maine
Party	Candidate	Running mate	Votes	Percentage	Electoral votes
Democratic	Barack Obama (incumbent)	Joe Biden (incumbent)	401,306	56.27%	4
Republican	Mitt Romney	Paul Ryan	292,276	40.98%	0
Libertarian	Gary Johnson	Jim Gray	9,352	1.31%	0
Green	Jill Stein	Cheri Honkala	8,119	1.14%	0
Write-ins	Write-ins		2,127	0.30%	0
Totals			724,758	100.00%	4

==== By county ====
County	Barack Obama Democratic		Mitt Romney Republican		Various candidates Other parties		Margin		Total votes cast
County	#	%	#	%	#	%	#	%	Total votes cast
Androscoggin	28,989	54.84%	22,232	42.06%	1,641	3.10%	6,757	12.78%	52,862
Aroostook	17,777	52.50%	15,196	44.88%	887	2.62%	2,581	7.62%	33,860
Cumberland	101,950	62.25%	57,821	35.30%	4,015	2.45%	44,129	26.95%	163,786
Franklin	9,367	57.53%	6,369	39.12%	546	3.35%	2,998	18.41%	16,282
Hancock	17,569	57.04%	12,324	40.01%	906	2.95%	5,245	17.03%	30,799
Kennebec	35,068	55.23%	26,519	41.76%	1,910	3.01%	8,549	13.47%	63,497
Knox	13,223	59.92%	8,248	37.38%	596	2.70%	4,975	22.54%	22,067
Lincoln	11,315	54.51%	8,899	42.87%	543	2.62%	2,416	11.64%	20,757
Oxford	16,330	55.51%	11,996	40.77%	1,094	3.72%	4,334	14.74%	29,420
Penobscot	38,811	50.20%	36,547	47.28%	1,948	2.52%	2,264	2.92%	77,306
Piscataquis	4,149	46.33%	4,530	50.59%	276	3.08%	-381	-4.26%	8,955
Sagadahoc	11,821	56.85%	8,429	40.54%	544	2.61%	3,392	16.31%	20,794
Somerset	12,216	49.28%	11,800	47.61%	771	3.11%	416	1.67%	24,787
Waldo	11,296	53.63%	9,058	43.01%	707	3.36%	2,238	10.62%	21,061
Washington	7,803	49.27%	7,550	47.68%	483	3.05%	253	1.59%	15,836
York	61,551	56.96%	43,900	40.63%	2,606	2.41%	17,651	16.33%	108,057
Total	401,306	56.27%	292,276	40.98%	19,598	2.75%	109,030	15.29%	713,180

==== By congressional district ====
Obama won both of Maine's two congressional districts.

District	Obama	Romney	Representative
1st	59.57%	38.18%	Chellie Pingree
2nd	52.94%	44.38%	Mike Michaud

== See also ==
- United States presidential elections in Maine
- 2012 Republican Party presidential primaries
- 2012 Republican Party presidential debates and forums
- Results of the 2012 Republican Party presidential primaries
- Maine Republican Party
