= 1944 United States presidential election in Maine =

- November 7, 1944

Nominee	Thomas E. Dewey	Franklin D. Roosevelt
Party	Republican	Democratic
Home state	New York	New York
Running mate	John W. Bricker	Harry S. Truman
Electoral vote	5	0
Popular vote	155,434	140,631
Percentage	52.44%	47.45%

Dewey
50–60%
60–70%
70–80%
80–90%
90–100%
Roosevelt
50–60%
60–70%
70–80%
80–90%
90–100%
Tie
40-50%
50%
President before election
Franklin D. Roosevelt
Democratic
Elected President
Franklin D. Roosevelt
Democratic

The 1944 United States presidential election in Maine took place on November 7, 1944, as part of the 1944 United States presidential election. State voters chose five electors to the Electoral College, which selected the president and vice president.

Maine was won by Republican Party candidate New York governor Thomas E. Dewey over Democratic candidate, incumbent President Franklin D. Roosevelt. Roosevelt also remains the most recent Democratic president to win more than one term without carrying Maine once.

Dewey won Maine by a narrow margin of 4.99%, making it one of the tighter statewide races in the election.

Along with Vermont, Maine is one of two states that never voted for President Franklin D. Roosevelt in any of his four victorious presidential campaigns.

== Results ==
1944 United States presidential election in Maine
Party	Candidate	Running mate	Popular vote		Electoral vote	
Party	Candidate	Running mate	Count	%	Count	%
Republican	Thomas Edmund Dewey of New York	John William Bricker of Ohio	155,434	52.44%	5	100.00%
Democratic	Franklin Delano Roosevelt of New York	Harry S. Truman of Missouri	140,631	47.45%	0	0.00%
Socialist Labor	Edward A. Teichert of Pennsylvania	Arla Arbaugh of Ohio	335	0.11%	0	0.00%
Total			296,400	100.00%	5	100.00%

=== Results by county ===
County	Thomas Edmund Dewey Republican		Franklin Delano Roosevelt Democratic		Edward A. Teichert Socialist Labor		Margin		Total votes cast
County	#	%	#	%	#	%	#	%	Total votes cast
Androscoggin	10,927	36.38%	19,078	63.51%	34	0.11%	-8,151	-27.13%	30,037
Aroostook	11,678	59.23%	8,017	40.66%	22	0.11%	3,661	18.57%	19,717
Cumberland	29,349	52.15%	26,857	47.72%	72	0.13%	2,492	4.43%	56,278
Franklin	4,127	60.90%	2,646	39.04%	4	0.06%	1,481	21.86%	6,777
Hancock	7,143	68.71%	3,241	31.18%	12	0.12%	3,902	37.53%	10,396
Kennebec	14,335	50.42%	14,070	49.49%	25	0.09%	265	0.93%	28,430
Knox	5,590	59.70%	3,758	40.14%	15	0.16%	1,832	19.56%	9,363
Lincoln	4,919	69.97%	2,102	29.90%	9	0.13%	2,817	40.07%	7,030
Oxford	8,053	55.76%	6,377	44.16%	12	0.08%	1,676	11.60%	14,442
Penobscot	16,934	55.95%	13,292	43.92%	38	0.13%	3,642	12.03%	30,264
Piscataquis	3,536	54.45%	2,957	45.53%	1	0.02%	579	8.92%	6,494
Sagadahoc	3,883	49.22%	4,003	50.74%	3	0.04%	-120	-1.52%	7,889
Somerset	7,167	57.23%	5,331	42.57%	25	0.20%	1,836	14.66%	12,523
Waldo	4,291	70.30%	1,807	29.60%	6	0.10%	2,484	40.70%	6,104
Washington	5,380	48.44%	5,709	51.40%	18	0.16%	-329	-2.96%	11,107
York	18,122	45.82%	21,386	54.08%	39	0.10%	-3,264	-8.26%	39,547
Totals	155,434	52.44%	140,631	47.45%	335	0.11%	14,803	4.99%	296,400

==== Counties that flipped from Democratic to Republican ====
- Kennebec

== See also ==
- United States presidential elections in Maine%
