= 1900 United States presidential election in Maine =

- November 6, 1900
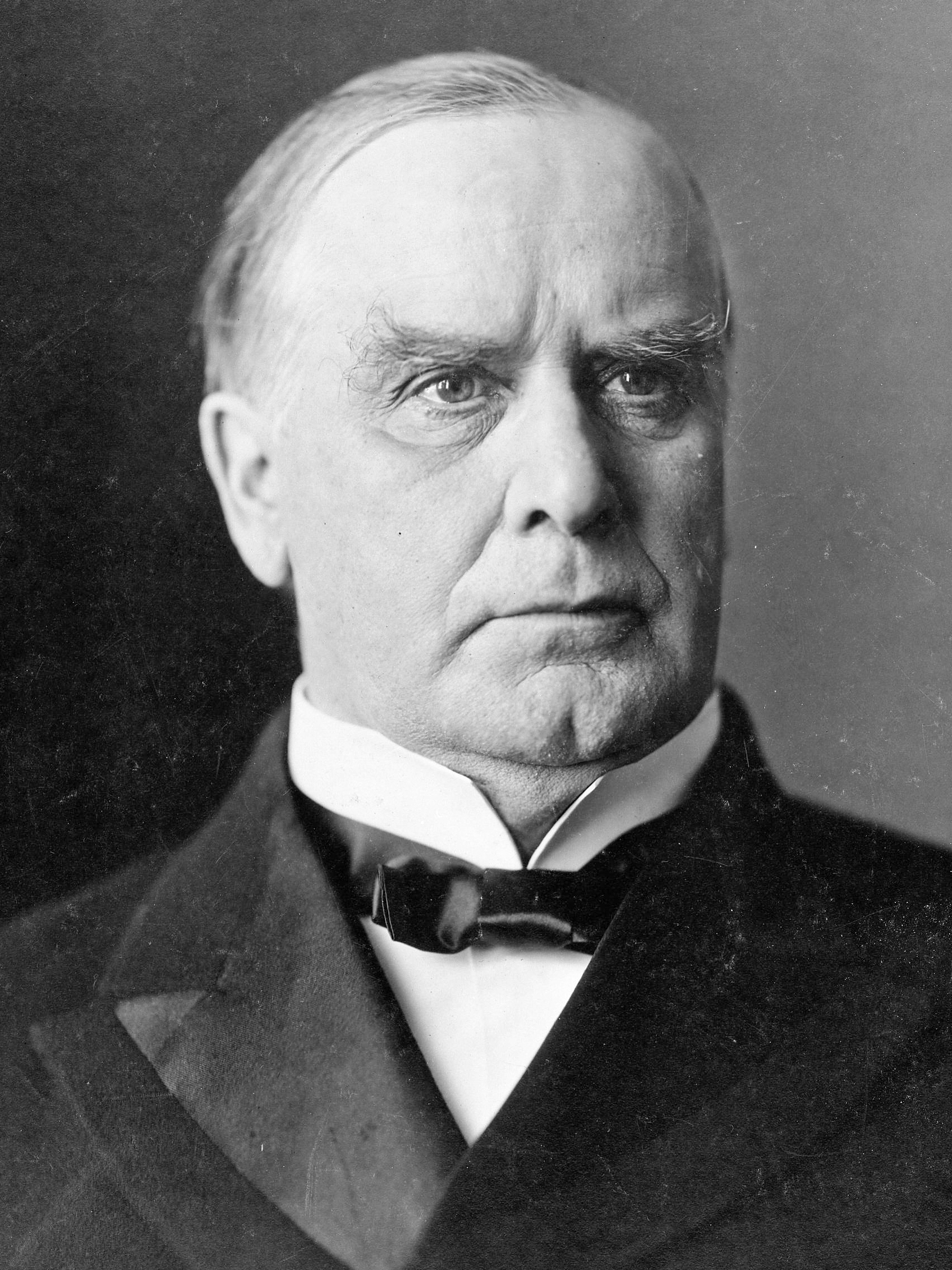

Nominee	William McKinley	William Jennings Bryan
Party	Republican	Democratic
Home state	Ohio	Nebraska
Running mate	Theodore Roosevelt	Adlai Stevenson I
Electoral vote	6	0
Popular vote	65,412 (Note: These Results differ slightly from those used by Edgar Eugene Robinson and taken from the Maine Secretary of State)	36,822
Percentage	61.89%	34.84%
County results
McKinley
50–60%
60–70%
70–80%
Bryan
40–50%
President before election
William McKinley
Republican
Elected President
William McKinley
Republican

The 1900 United States presidential election in Maine took place on November 6, 1900, as part of the 1900 United States presidential election. Voters chose six representatives, or electors to the Electoral College, who voted for president and vice president.

Maine overwhelmingly voted for the Republican nominee, President William McKinley, over the Democratic nominee, former U.S. Representative and 1896 Democratic presidential nominee William Jennings Bryan. McKinley won Maine by a margin of 27.85% in this rematch of the 1896 United States presidential election. The return of economic prosperity and recent victory in the Spanish–American War helped McKinley to score a decisive victory. Nonetheless, Bryan's narrow victory in Knox County was the only occasion between 1884 and 1908 that a Democrat carried any of Maine's counties, and one of only two such cases (Note: In 1880, Winfield S. Hancock carried Aroostook County, Knox County, Lincoln County and Waldo County.) between 1856 and 1908 inclusive.

With 61.89% of the popular vote, Maine would be McKinley's third strongest victory in terms of percentage in the popular vote after Vermont and North Dakota.

Bryan had previously lost Maine to McKinley four years earlier and would later lose the state again in 1908 to William Howard Taft.

== Results ==
1900 United States presidential election in Maine
Party	Candidate	Running mate	Popular vote		Electoral vote	
Party	Candidate	Running mate	Count	%	Count	%
Republican	William McKinley of Ohio (incumbent)	Theodore Roosevelt of New York	65,412	61.89%	6	100.00%
Democratic	William Jennings Bryan of Nebraska	Adlai Ewing Stevenson I of Illinois	36,822	34.84%	0	0.00%
Prohibition	John Granville Woolley of Illinois	Henry Brewer Metcalf of Rhode Island	2,581	2.44%	0	0.00%
Socialist	Eugene Victor Debs of Indiana	Job Harriman of California	878	0.83%	0	0.00%
Total			106,093	100.00%	6	100.00%

=== Results by county ===
County	William McKinley Republican		William Jennings Bryan Democratic		John Granville Woolley Prohibition		Eugene Victor Debs Socialist		Margin		Total votes cast
County	#	%	#	%	#	%	#	%	#	%	Total votes cast
Androscoggin	4,648	57.44%	3,182	39.32%	203	2.51%	59	0.73%	1,466	18.12%	8,092
Aroostook	4,192	76.07%	1,030	18.69%	280	5.08%	9	0.16%	3,162	57.38%	5,511
Cumberland	8,824	58.59%	5,770	38.31%	337	2.24%	129	0.86%	3,054	20.28%	15,060
Franklin	2,235	65.99%	1,085	32.03%	65	1.92%	2	0.06%	1,150	33.96%	3,387
Hancock	3,432	63.70%	1,860	34.52%	69	1.28%	27	0.50%	1,572	29.18%	5,388
Kennebec	6,228	62.60%	3,410	34.27%	257	2.58%	54	0.54%	2,818	28.33%	9,949
Knox	2,762	48.76%	2,765	48.81%	74	1.31%	64	1.13%	-3	-0.05%	5,665
Lincoln	2,212	59.98%	1,419	38.48%	48	1.30%	9	0.24%	793	21.50%	3,688
Oxford	3,912	64.19%	2,023	33.20%	146	2.40%	13	0.21%	1,889	30.99%	6,094
Penobscot	6,873	63.87%	3,615	33.59%	237	2.20%	36	0.33%	3,258	30.28%	10,761
Piscataquis	2,023	67.50%	824	27.49%	146	4.87%	4	0.13%	1,199	40.01%	2,997
Sagadahoc	2,245	64.49%	1,025	29.45%	192	5.52%	19	0.55%	1,220	35.04%	3,481
Somerset	3,727	61.21%	1,949	32.01%	121	1.99%	292	4.80%	1,778	29.20%	6,089
Waldo	2,469	57.96%	1,710	40.14%	61	1.43%	20	0.47%	759	17.82%	4,260
Washington	3,682	61.60%	2,109	35.29%	110	1.84%	76	1.27%	1,573	26.31%	5,977
York	6,949	61.52%	4,046	35.82%	235	2.08%	65	0.58%	2,903	25.70%	11,295
Totals	66,413	61.67%	37,822	35.12%	2,581	2.40%	878	0.82%	28,591	26.55%	107,694

== See also ==
- United States presidential elections in Maine
