= 1832 United States presidential election in Maine =

- November 2 – December 5, 1832
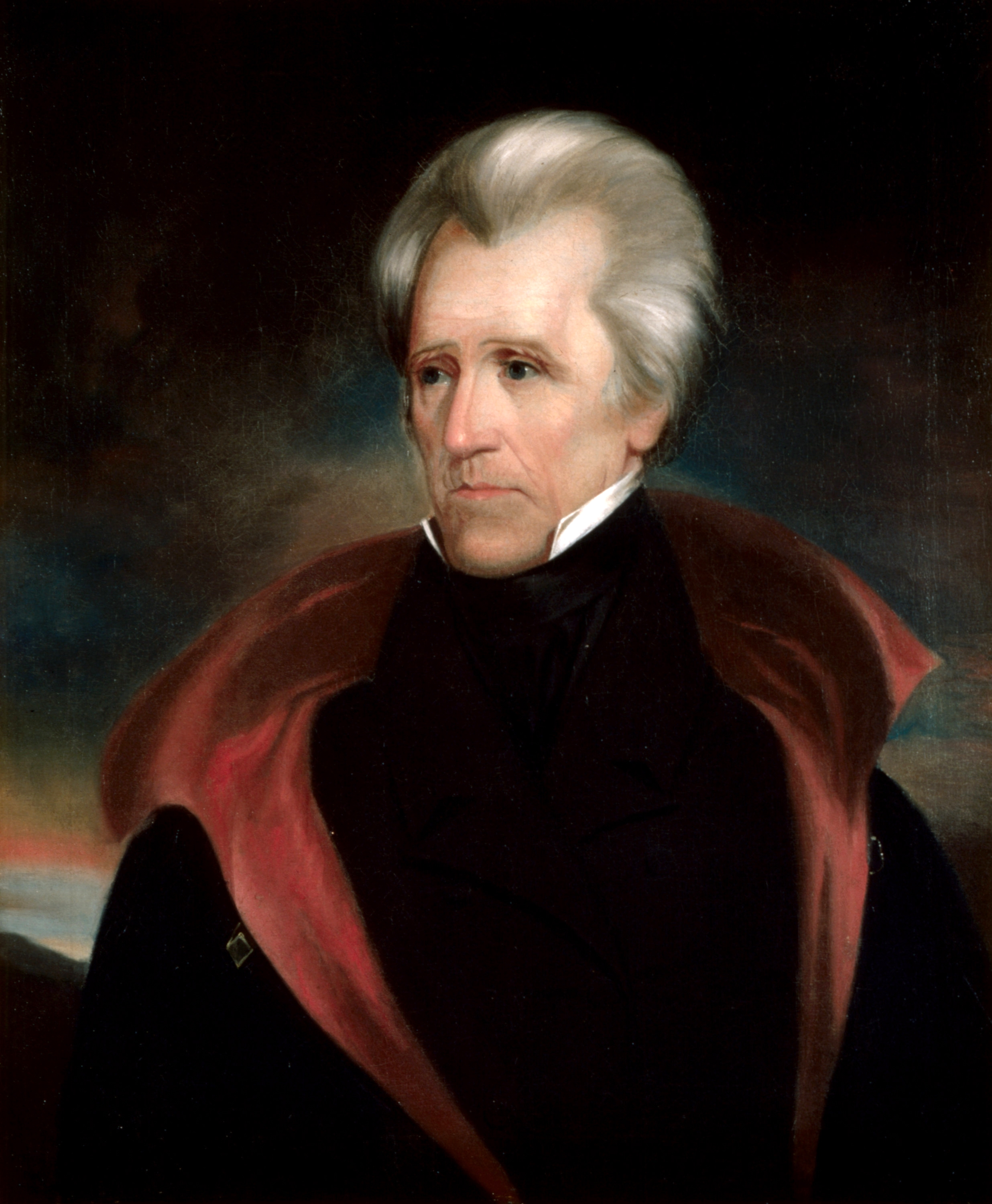

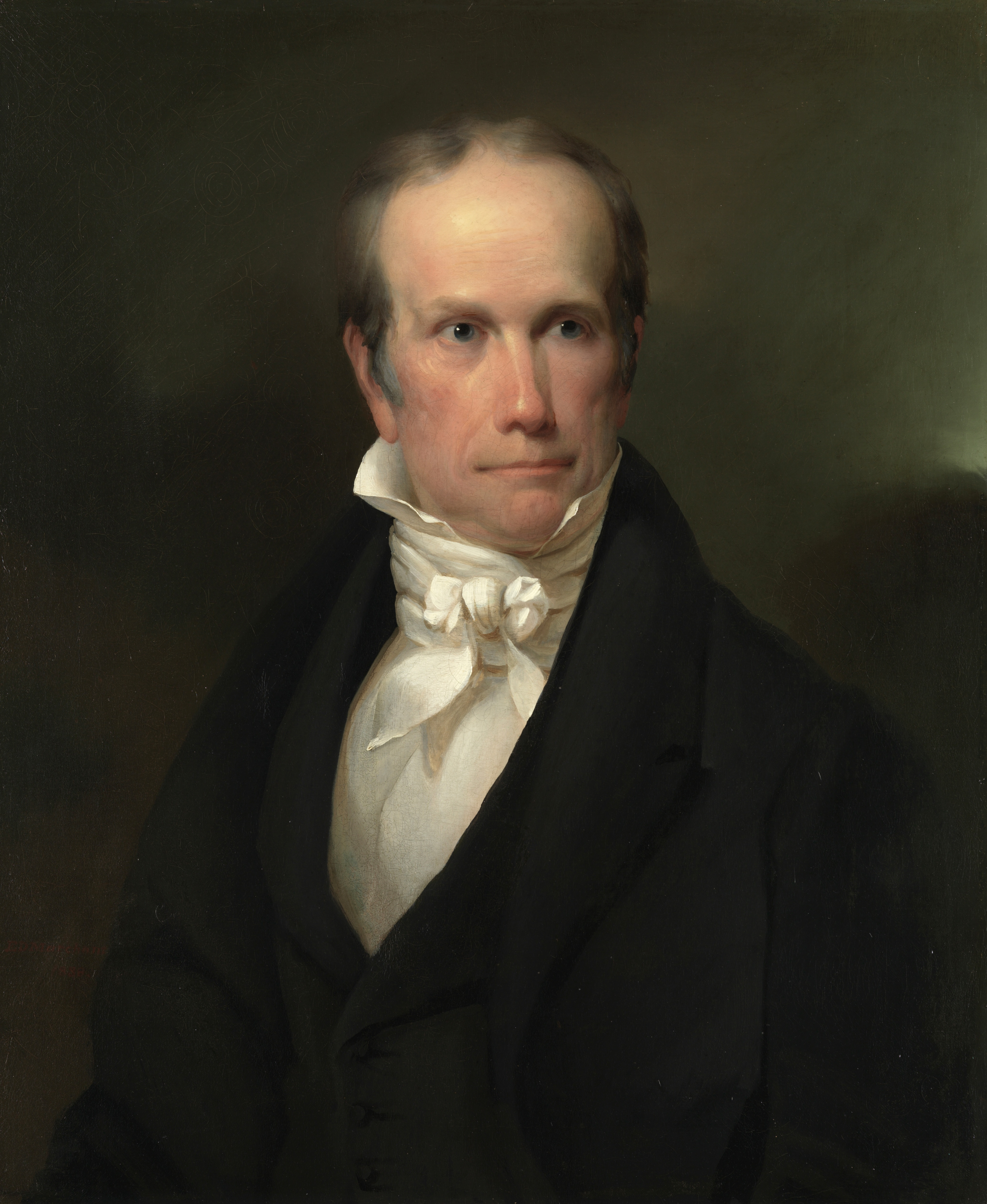
Nominee	Andrew Jackson	Henry Clay
Party	Democratic	National Republican
Home state	Tennessee	Kentucky
Running mate	Martin Van Buren	John Sergeant
Electoral vote	10	0
Popular vote	33,978	27,331
Percentage	54.67%	43.97%
County results
Jackson
50–60%
60–70%
70–80%
Clay
50–60%
President before election
Andrew Jackson
Democratic
Elected President
Andrew Jackson
Democratic

The 1832 United States presidential election in Maine took place between November 2 and December 5, 1832, as part of the 1832 United States presidential election. Voters chose ten representatives, or electors to the Electoral College, who voted for President and Vice President.

Maine voted for the Democratic Party candidate, Andrew Jackson, over the National Republican candidate, Henry Clay, and the Anti-Masonic Party candidate, William Wirt. Jackson won the state by a margin of 10.70%.

== Results ==
1832 United States presidential election in Maine
Party	Candidate	Votes	Percentage	Electoral votes
Democratic	Andrew Jackson (incumbent)	33,978	54.67%	10
National Republican	Henry Clay	27,331	43.97%	0
Anti-Masonic	William Wirt	844	1.36%	0
Totals		62,153	100.0%	10

== See also ==
- United States presidential elections in Maine
