= 1908 United States presidential election in Maine =

- November 3, 1908

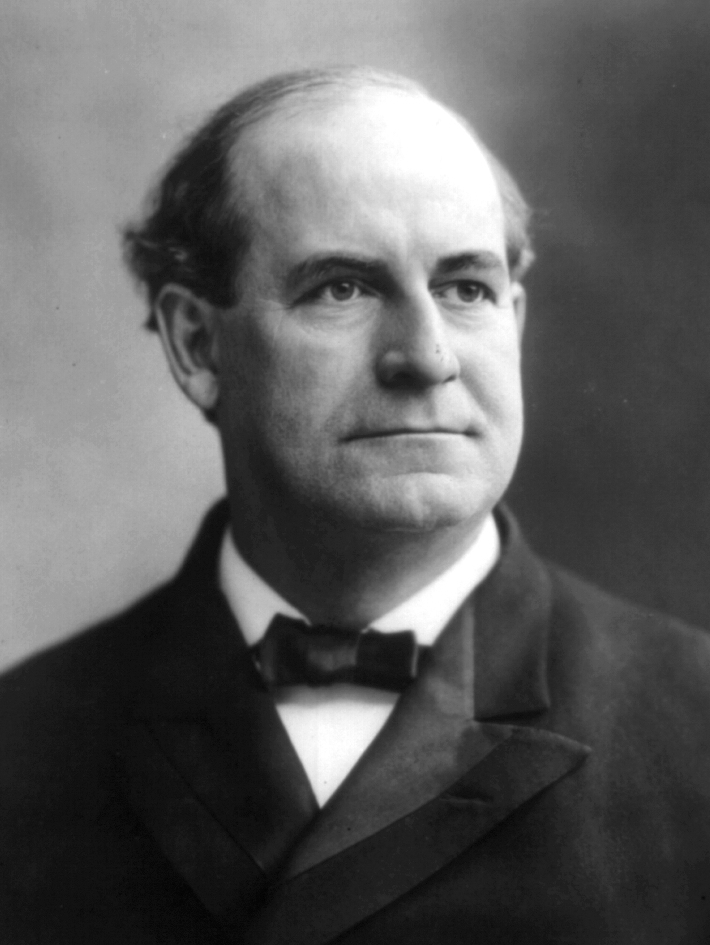
Nominee	William Howard Taft	William Jennings Bryan
Party	Republican	Democratic
Home state	Ohio	Nebraska
Running mate	James S. Sherman	John W. Kern
Electoral vote	6	0
Popular vote	66,987	35,403
Percentage	63.00%	33.29%
County results
Taft
50–60%
60–70%
70–80%
President before election
Theodore Roosevelt
Republican
Elected President
William Howard Taft
Republican

The 1908 United States presidential election in Maine took place on November 3, 1908, as part of the 1908 United States presidential election. Voters chose six representatives, or electors to the Electoral College, who voted for president and vice president.

Maine voted for the Republican nominees, Secretary of War William Howard Taft of Ohio and his running mate James S. Sherman of New York. They defeated the Democratic nominees, former U.S. Representative William Jennings Bryan of Nebraska and his running mate John W. Kern of Indiana.. Taft won the state by a margin of 29.71%.

With 63% of the popular vote, Maine would be Taft's second strongest victory in terms of percentage in the popular vote after nearby Vermont.

Bryan had previously lost Maine to William McKinley in both 1896 and 1900.

== Results ==
1908 United States presidential election in Maine
Party	Candidate	Running mate	Popular vote		Electoral vote	
Party	Candidate	Running mate	Count	%	Count	%
Republican	William Howard Taft of Ohio	James Schoolcraft Sherman of New York	66,987	63.00%	6	100.00%
Democratic	William Jennings Bryan of Nebraska	John Worth Kern of Indiana	35,403	33.29%	0	0.00%
Socialist	Eugene Victor Debs of Indiana	Benjamin Hanford of New York	1,758	1.65%	0	0.00%
Prohibition	Eugene Wilder Chafin of Illinois	Aaron Sherman Watkins of Ohio	1,487	1.25%	0	0.00%
Independence	Thomas Louis Hisgen of Massachusetts	John Temple Graves of Georgia	700	0.66%	0	0.00%
N/A	Others	Others	1	0.01%	0	0.00%
Total			106,336	100.00%	6	100.00%

=== Results by county ===
County	William Howard Taft Republican		William Jennings Bryan Democratic		Eugene Victor Debs Socialist		Eugene Wilder Chafin Prohibition		Thomas Louis Hisgen Independence		Margin		Total votes cast
County	#	%	#	%	#	%	#	%	#	%	#	%	Total votes cast
Androscoggin	4,381	56.06%	3,095	39.60%	183	2.34%	96	1.23%	60	0.77%	1,286	16.46%	7,815
Aroostook	4,783	77.56%	1,157	18.76%	53	0.86%	145	2.35%	29	0.47%	3,626	58.80%	6,167
Cumberland	10,593	61.81%	5,735	33.46%	372	2.17%	270	1.58%	168	0.98%	4,858	28.35%	17,138
Franklin	2,173	68.46%	930	29.30%	15	0.47%	51	1.61%	8	0.25%	1,243	39.12%	3,174
Hancock	3,169	61.50%	1,846	35.82%	77	1.49%	36	0.70%	25	0.49%	1,323	25.67%	5,153
Kennebec	6,133	65.99%	2,871	30.89%	99	1.07%	132	1.42%	59	0.63%	3,262	35.10%	9,294
Knox	2,228	50.04%	1,932	43.40%	230	5.17%	40	0.90%	22	0.49%	296	6.65%	4,452
Lincoln	1,693	56.43%	1,196	39.87%	51	1.70%	50	1.67%	10	0.33%	497	16.57%	3,000
Oxford	4,179	64.53%	2,093	32.32%	63	0.97%	66	1.02%	75	1.16%	2,086	32.21%	6,476
Penobscot	7,336	66.03%	3,525	31.73%	102	0.92%	117	1.05%	30	0.27%	3,811	34.30%	11,110
Piscataquis	2,157	70.49%	828	27.06%	7	0.23%	63	2.06%	5	0.16%	1,329	43.43%	3,060
Sagadahoc	1,776	64.00%	838	30.20%	65	2.34%	65	2.34%	31	1.12%	938	33.80%	2,775
Somerset	3,688	65.30%	1,676	29.67%	198	3.51%	62	1.10%	24	0.42%	2,012	35.62%	5,648
Waldo	2,491	63.22%	1,335	33.88%	68	1.73%	32	0.81%	14	0.36%	1,156	29.34%	3,940
Washington	3,507	59.49%	2,256	38.27%	60	1.02%	47	0.80%	25	0.42%	1,251	21.22%	5,895
York	6,700	59.64%	4,090	36.40%	115	1.02%	215	1.91%	115	1.02%	2,610	23.23%	11,235
Totals	66,987	63.00%	35,403	33.29%	1,758	1.65%	1,487	1.40%	700	0.66%	31,584	29.70%	106,332

== See also ==
- United States presidential elections in Maine
