= 1952 United States presidential election in Maine =

- November 4, 1952

Nominee	Dwight D. Eisenhower	Adlai Stevenson
Party	Republican	Democratic
Home state	New York	Illinois
Running mate	Richard Nixon	John Sparkman
Electoral vote	5	0
Popular vote	232,353	118,806
Percentage	66.05%	33.77%

Eisenhower
50–60%
60–70%
70–80%
80–90%
90–100%
Stevenson
50–60%
60–70%
70–80%
80–90%
Tie
Tie
President before election
Harry S. Truman
Democratic
Elected President
Dwight D. Eisenhower
Republican

The 1952 United States presidential election in Maine took place on November 4, 1952, as part of the 1952 United States presidential election which was held throughout all contemporary 48 states. Voters chose five representatives, or electors to the Electoral College, who voted for president and vice president.

Maine overwhelmingly voted for the Republican nominee, General Dwight D. Eisenhower of New York, over the Democratic nominee, former Governor Adlai Stevenson of Illinois. Eisenhower ran with Senator Richard Nixon of California, while Stevenson's running mate was Senator John Sparkman of Alabama.

Eisenhower won Maine by a margin of 32.28%.

== Results ==
1952 United States presidential election in Maine
Party	Candidate	Running mate	Popular vote		Electoral vote	
Party	Candidate	Running mate	Count	%	Count	%
Republican	Dwight David Eisenhower of New York	Richard Nixon of California	232,353	66.05%	5	100.00%
Democratic	Adlai Stevenson II of Illinois	John Jackson Sparkman of Alabama	118,806	33.77%	0	0.00%
Progressive	Vincent Hallinan of California	Charlotta Amanda Bass of New York	332	0.09%	0	0.00%
Socialist Labor	Eric Hass of New York	Stephen Emery of New York	156	0.04%	0	0.00%
Socialist	Darlington Hoopes of Pennsylvania	Samuel H. Friedman of New York	138	0.03%	0	0.00%
N/A	Others	Others	1	0.01%	0	0.00%
Total			351,786	100.00%	5	100.00%

=== Results by county ===
County	Dwight D. Eisenhower Republican		Adlai Stevenson Democratic		Vincent Hallinan Progressive		Eric Hass Socialist Labor		Darlington Hoopes Socialist		Margin		Total votes cast
County	#	%	#	%	#	%	#	%	#	%	#	%	Total votes cast
Androscoggin	18,049	50.59%	17,560	49.22%	34	0.10%	23	0.06%	10	0.03%	489	1.37%	35,676
Aroostook	16,851	68.85%	7,561	30.89%	28	0.11%	16	0.07%	19	0.08%	9,290	37.96%	24,476 (Note: One write-in vote was recorded from this county.)
Cumberland	46,957	69.16%	20,831	30.68%	57	0.08%	25	0.04%	28	0.04%	26,126	38.48%	67,898
Franklin	5,885	73.23%	2,137	26.59%	10	0.12%	4	0.05%	0	0.00%	3,748	46.64%	8,036
Hancock	10,596	83.21%	2,111	16.58%	18	0.14%	7	0.05%	2	0.02%	8,485	66.63%	12,734
Kennebec	21,207	63.59%	12,113	36.32%	10	0.03%	14	0.04%	7	0.02%	9,094	27.27%	33,351
Knox	8,793	78.32%	2,414	21.50%	11	0.10%	4	0.04%	5	0.04%	6,379	56.82%	11,227
Lincoln	6,766	83.80%	1,299	16.09%	6	0.07%	1	0.01%	2	0.02%	5,467	67.71%	8,074
Oxford	11,575	66.62%	5,757	33.13%	28	0.16%	5	0.03%	10	0.06%	5,818	33.49%	17,375
Penobscot	24,614	68.59%	11,222	31.27%	22	0.06%	12	0.03%	15	0.04%	13,392	37.32%	35,885
Piscataquis	4,652	67.20%	2,261	32.66%	9	0.13%	1	0.01%	0	0.00%	2,391	34.54%	6,923
Sagadahoc	5,799	66.90%	2,850	32.88%	10	0.12%	5	0.06%	4	0.05%	2,949	34.02%	8,668
Somerset	9,805	66.93%	4,815	32.87%	18	0.12%	4	0.03%	7	0.05%	4,990	34.06%	14,649
Waldo	6,363	80.29%	1,545	19.50%	9	0.11%	6	0.08%	2	0.03%	4,818	60.79%	7,925
Washington	7,396	65.89%	3,806	33.91%	10	0.09%	8	0.07%	5	0.04%	3,590	31.98%	11,225
York	27,045	56.74%	20,524	43.06%	52	0.11%	22	0.05%	21	0.04%	6,521	13.68%	47,664
Totals	232,353	66.05%	118,806	33.77%	332	0.09%	156	0.04%	138	0.04%	113,547	32.28%	351,786

==== Counties that flipped from Democratic to Republican ====
- Androscoggin
- York

== See also ==
- United States presidential elections in Maine
