= 1948 United States presidential election in Maine =

- November 2, 1948
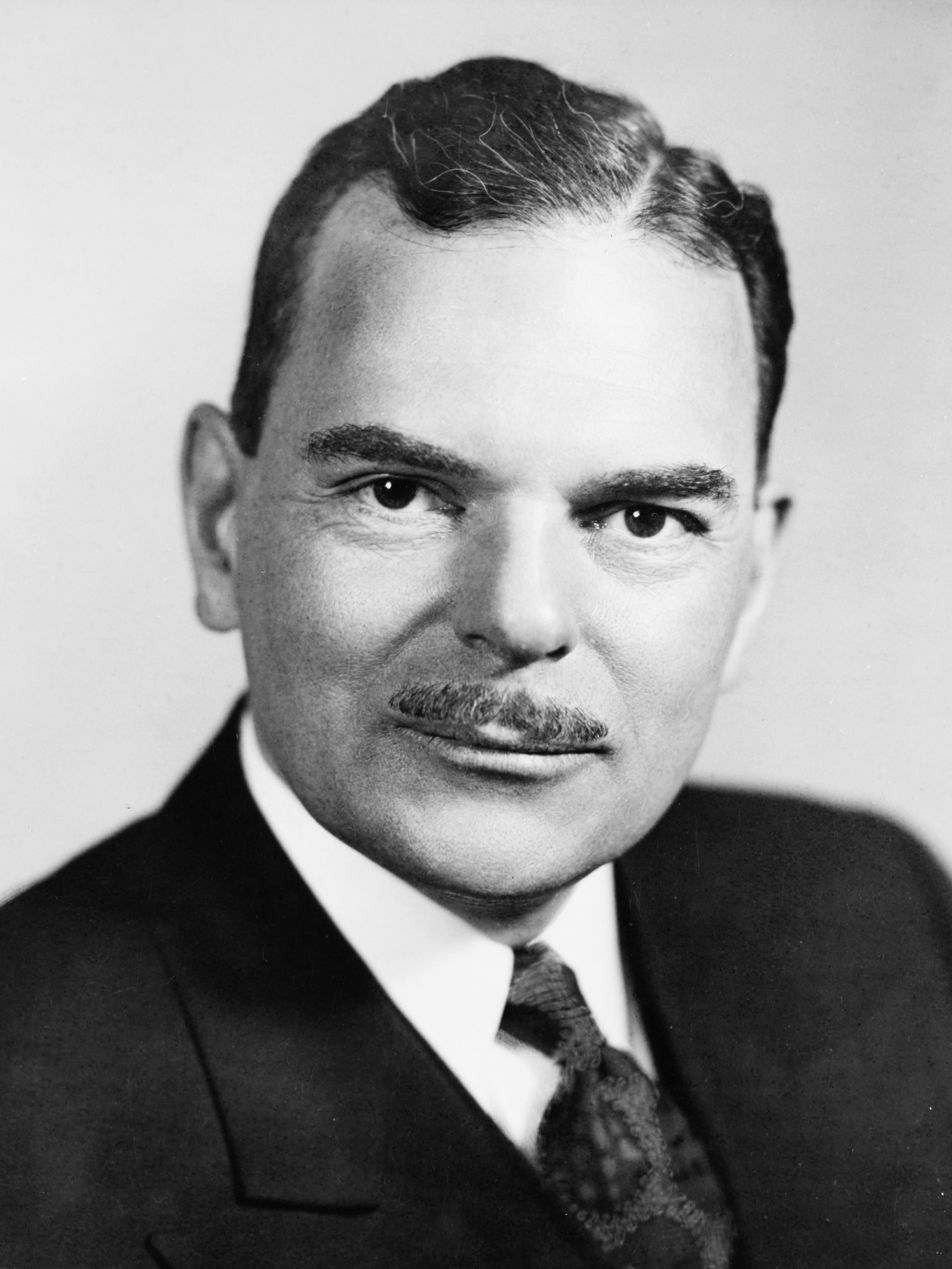

Nominee	Thomas E. Dewey	Harry S. Truman
Party	Republican	Democratic
Home state	New York	Missouri
Running mate	Earl Warren	Alben W. Barkley
Electoral vote	5	0
Popular vote	150,234	111,916
Percentage	56.74%	42.27%

Dewey
40–50%
50–60%
60–70%
70–80%
80–90%
90–100%
Truman
50–60%
60–70%
70–80%
80–90%
90–100%
Other
Tie
President before election
Harry S. Truman
Democratic
Elected President
Harry S. Truman
Democratic

The 1948 United States presidential election in Maine took place on November 2, 1948, as part of the 1948 United States presidential election. State voters chose five electors to the Electoral College, which selected the president and vice president.

Maine was won by Republican candidate New York governor Thomas E. Dewey over Democratic candidate, incumbent President Harry S. Truman.

Dewey won Maine by a margin of 14.47%. With 56.74% of the popular vote, it would be his second strongest state after nearby Vermont.

== Results ==
1948 United States presidential election in Maine
Party	Candidate	Running mate	Popular vote		Electoral vote	
Party	Candidate	Running mate	Count	%	Count	%
Republican	Thomas Edmund Dewey of New York	Earl Warren of California	150,234	56.74%	5	100.00%
Democratic	Harry S. Truman of Missouri	Alben William Barkley of Kentucky	111,916	42.27%	0	0.00%
Progressive	Henry Agard Wallace of Iowa	Glen Hearst Taylor of Idaho	1,884	0.71%	0	0.00%
Socialist	Norman Thomas of New York	Tucker Powell Smith of Michigan	548	0.21%	0	0.00%
Socialist Labor	Edward A. Teichert of Pennsylvania	Stephen Emery of New York	206	0.07%	0	0.00%
N/A	Others	Others	1	0.00%	0	0.00%
Total			264,789	100.00%	5	100.00%

=== Results by county ===
County	Thomas E. Dewey Republican		Harry S. Truman Democratic		Henry A. Wallace Progressive		Various candidates Other parties		Margin		Total votes cast
County	#	%	#	%	#	%	#	%	#	%	Total votes cast
Androscoggin	11,443	39.24%	17,405	59.68%	214	0.73%	103	0.35%	-5,962	-20.44%	29,165
Aroostook	9,459	56.51%	7,183	42.91%	57	0.34%	41	0.24%	2,276	13.60%	16,740
Cumberland	30,284	60.71%	18,913	37.91%	527	1.06%	161	0.32%	11,371	22.80%	49,885
Franklin	3,741	63.19%	2,135	36.06%	29	0.49%	15	0.25%	1,606	27.13%	5,920
Hancock	6,863	77.72%	1,878	21.27%	48	0.54%	41	0.46%	4,985	56.45%	8,830
Kennebec	13,923	55.12%	11,163	44.19%	114	0.45%	60	0.24%	2,760	10.93%	25,260
Knox	5,374	72.67%	1,924	26.02%	80	1.08%	17	0.23%	3,450	46.65%	7,395
Lincoln	4,743	80.47%	1,095	18.58%	42	0.71%	14	0.24%	3,648	61.89%	5,894
Oxford	7,444	58.24%	5,183	40.55%	127	0.99%	28	0.22%	2,261	17.69%	12,782
Penobscot	16,367	59.92%	10,705	39.19%	152	0.56%	91	0.33%	5,662	20.73%	27,315
Piscataquis	3,227	59.34%	2,181	40.11%	25	0.46%	5	0.09%	1,046	19.23%	5,438
Sagadahoc	3,745	58.77%	2,556	40.11%	61	0.96%	10	0.16%	1,189	18.66%	6,372
Somerset	6,301	60.48%	4,034	38.72%	63	0.60%	20	0.19%	2,267	21.76%	10,418
Waldo	4,371	74.21%	1,469	24.94%	29	0.49%	21	0.36%	2,902	49.27%	5,890
Washington	5,130	58.64%	3,538	40.44%	54	0.62%	26	0.30%	1,592	18.20%	8,748
York	17,819	46.00%	20,554	53.06%	262	0.68%	102	0.26%	-2,735	-7.06%	38,737
Totals	150,234	56.74%	111,916	42.27%	1,884	0.71%	755	0.29%	38,318	14.47%	264,789

==== Counties that flipped from Democratic to Republican ====
- Sagadahoc
- Washington

== See also ==
- United States presidential elections in Maine
