= 1924 United States presidential election in Maine =

- November 4, 1924

| Nominee | Calvin Coolidge | John W. Davis | Robert M. La Follette |
| Party | Republican | Democratic | Progressive |
| Home state | Massachusetts | West Virginia | Wisconsin |
| Running mate | Charles G. Dawes | Charles W. Bryan | Burton K. Wheeler |
| Electoral vote | 6 | 0 | 0 |
| Popular vote | 138,440 | 41,964 | 11,382 |
| Percentage | 72.03% | 21.83% | 5.92% |
County results
Coolidge
50–60%
60–70%
70–80%
80–90%
President before election
Calvin Coolidge
Republican
Elected President
Calvin Coolidge
Republican

The 1924 United States presidential election in Maine took place on November 4, 1924, as part of the 1924 United States presidential election which was held throughout all contemporary 48 states. Voters chose six representatives, or electors to the Electoral College, who voted for president and vice president.

Maine voted for the Republican nominee, incumbent President Calvin Coolidge of Massachusetts, over the Democratic nominee, Ambassador John W. Davis of West Virginia. Coolidge ran with former Budget Director Charles G. Dawes of Illinois, while Davis ran with Governor Charles W. Bryan of Nebraska. Also in the running that year was the Progressive Party nominee, Senator Robert M. La Follette of Wisconsin and his running mate Senator Burton K. Wheeler of Montana. La Follette's support base was primarily among rural German and Scandinavian Americans, and he possessed little appeal in the Northeast outside a few New York and Boston anti-Prohibition precincts. Excluding the former Confederacy – where the lower classes were almost entirely disfranchised – Maine was La Follette's seventh-weakest of thirty-seven states, and he exceeded seven percent only in heavily Québecois Androscoggin County.

The 1920s were a fiercely Republican decade in American politics, and Maine in that era was a fiercely Republican state in presidential elections. The economic boom and social good feelings of the Roaring Twenties under popular Republican leadership virtually guaranteed Calvin Coolidge an easy win in the state against the conservative Southern Democrat John Davis, who had little appeal in Northeastern states like Maine.

Coolidge won Maine by a landslide margin of 50.20%. He possessed a unique personal popularity which helped him in the state and the rest of New England. He was the epitome of a traditional New England Yankee, having been born in the small-town of Plymouth Notch, Vermont, and establishing his political career nearby as Governor of Massachusetts. Thus Coolidge remained especially popular with voters across the New England region.

With 72.03% of the popular vote, Maine would prove to be Coolidge's third strongest state in the 1924 election in terms of popular vote percentage after Vermont and Michigan.

== Results ==
1924 United States presidential election in Maine
| Party | Candidate | Running mate | Popular vote | | Electoral vote | |
| Party | Candidate | Running mate | Count | % | Count | % |
|---|---|---|---|---|---|---|
| Republican | Calvin Coolidge of Massachusetts | Charles Gates Dawes of Illinois | 138,440 | 72.03% | 6 | 100.00% |
| Democratic | John William Davis of West Virginia | Charles Wayland Bryan of Nebraska | 41,964 | 21.83% | 0 | 0.00% |
| Progressive | Robert Marion La Follette of Wisconsin | Burton Kendall Wheeler of Montana | 11,382 | 5.92% | 0 | 0.00% |
| Socialist Labor | Frank Tetes Johns of Oregon | Verne L. Reynolds of New York | 406 | 0.21% | 0 | 0.00% |
| Total | | | 192,192 | 100.00% | 6 | 100.00% |

=== Results by county ===
| County | John Calvin Coolidge Republican | | John William Davis Democratic | | Robert M. La Follette Sr. Progressive | | Frank Tetes Johns Socialist Labor | | Margin | | Total votes cast |
| County | # | % | # | % | # | % | # | % | # | % | Total votes cast |
|---|---|---|---|---|---|---|---|---|---|---|---|
| Androscoggin | 9,680 | 59.80% | 4,733 | 29.24% | 1,743 | 10.77% | 31 | 0.19% | 4,947 | 30.56% | 16,187 |
| Aroostook | 9,554 | 81.61% | 1,510 | 12.90% | 626 | 5.35% | 17 | 0.15% | 8,044 | 68.71% | 11,707 |
| Cumberland | 26,187 | 73.31% | 7,078 | 19.82% | 2,398 | 6.71% | 56 | 0.16% | 19,109 | 53.50% | 35,719 |
| Franklin | 3,389 | 72.40% | 1,123 | 23.99% | 156 | 3.33% | 13 | 0.28% | 2,266 | 48.41% | 4,681 |
| Hancock | 5,474 | 77.37% | 1,392 | 19.67% | 195 | 2.76% | 14 | 0.20% | 4,082 | 57.70% | 7,075 |
| Kennebec | 13,122 | 72.26% | 4,184 | 23.04% | 827 | 4.55% | 26 | 0.14% | 8,938 | 49.22% | 18,159 |
| Knox | 4,919 | 69.99% | 1,770 | 25.18% | 272 | 3.87% | 67 | 0.95% | 3,149 | 44.81% | 7,028 |
| Lincoln | 3,311 | 77.36% | 878 | 20.51% | 82 | 1.92% | 9 | 0.21% | 2,433 | 56.85% | 4,280 |
| Oxford | 7,062 | 69.90% | 2,563 | 25.37% | 466 | 4.61% | 12 | 0.12% | 4,499 | 44.53% | 10,103 |
| Penobscot | 15,081 | 74.93% | 3,618 | 17.97% | 1,386 | 6.89% | 43 | 0.21% | 11,463 | 56.95% | 20,128 |
| Piscataquis | 4,031 | 75.94% | 974 | 18.35% | 300 | 5.65% | 3 | 0.06% | 3,057 | 57.59% | 5,308 |
| Sagadahoc | 3,518 | 73.26% | 1,084 | 22.57% | 193 | 4.02% | 7 | 0.15% | 2,434 | 50.69% | 4,802 |
| Somerset | 6,855 | 73.83% | 1,822 | 19.62% | 579 | 6.24% | 29 | 0.31% | 5,033 | 54.21% | 9,285 |
| Waldo | 4,003 | 75.80% | 1,125 | 21.30% | 149 | 2.82% | 4 | 0.08% | 2,878 | 54.50% | 5,281 |
| Washington | 6,010 | 69.71% | 2,106 | 24.43% | 483 | 5.60% | 22 | 0.26% | 3,904 | 45.28% | 8,621 |
| York | 16,244 | 68.17% | 6,004 | 25.20% | 1,527 | 6.41% | 53 | 0.22% | 10,240 | 42.97% | 23,828 |
| Totals | 138,440 | 72.03% | 41,964 | 21.83% | 11,382 | 5.92% | 406 | 0.21% | 96,476 | 50.20% | 192,192 |

== See also ==
- United States presidential elections in Maine
