= United States presidential elections in Maine =

Presidential elections in Maine
- Number of elections: 52
- Voted Democratic: 19
- Voted Republican: 30
- Voted Whig: 1
- Voted Democratic-Republican: 2
- Voted other: 0
- Voted for winning candidate: 32
- Voted for losing candidate: 20

Following is a table of United States presidential elections in Maine, ordered by year. Since its admission to statehood in 1820, Maine has participated in every U.S. presidential election. Prior to 1820, much of the territory currently comprising the state of Maine was part of the state of Massachusetts, and citizens residing in that area have thus been able to participate in every U.S. election.

Since 1972, Maine awards two electoral votes based on the statewide vote, and one vote for each of the two congressional districts. However, it is rare that this results in a split vote. It has done so three times, in 2016, 2020, and 2024. The only other state to allow for split electoral college votes is Nebraska.

Winners of the state are in bold. The shading refers to the state winner, and not the national winner.

== Elections from 1864 to present ==
View source data.

1st congressional district
View source data.

2nd congressional district
View source data.

Year	Winner (nationally)	Votes	Percent	Runner-up (nationally)	Votes	Percent	Other national candidates (Note: For purposes of these lists, other national candidates are defined as those who won at least one electoral vote, or won at least ten percent of the vote in multiple states.)	Votes	Percent	Electoral Votes	Notes
2024	Donald Trump	377,977	45.46	**Kamala Harris**	435,652	52.40	—			4	Electoral votes split: 3 to Harris, 1 to Trump. (Harris won statewide and in the 1st congressional district; Trump won in the 2nd district.)
2020	**Joe Biden**	435,072	53.09	Donald Trump	360,737	44.02	—			4	Electoral votes split: 3 to Biden, 1 to Trump. (Biden won statewide and in the 1st congressional district; Trump won in the 2nd district.)
2016	Donald Trump (Note: Won the electoral college while losing the popular vote)	335,593	44.87	**Hillary Clinton**	357,735	47.83	—			4	Electoral votes split: 3 to Clinton, 1 to Trump. (Clinton won statewide and in the 1st congressional district; Trump won in the 2nd district.)
2012	**Barack Obama**	401,306	56.27	Mitt Romney	292,276	40.98	—			4	
2008	**Barack Obama**	421,923	57.71	John McCain	295,273	40.38	—			4	
2004	George W. Bush	330,201	44.58	**John Kerry**	396,842	53.57	—			4	
2000	George W. Bush	286,616	43.97	**Al Gore**	319,951	49.09	—			4	
1996	**Bill Clinton**	312,788	51.62	Bob Dole	186,378	30.76	Ross Perot	85,970	14.19	4	
1992	**Bill Clinton**	263,420	38.77	George H. W. Bush	206,504	30.39	Ross Perot	206,820	30.44	4	
1988	**George H. W. Bush**	307,131	55.34	Michael Dukakis	243,569	43.88	—			4	
1984	**Ronald Reagan**	336,500	60.83	Walter Mondale	214,515	38.78	—			4	
1980	**Ronald Reagan**	238,522	45.61	Jimmy Carter	220,974	42.25	John B. Anderson	53,327	10.2	4	
1976	Jimmy Carter	232,279	48.07	**Gerald Ford**	236,320	48.91	—			4	
1972	**Richard Nixon**	256,458	61.46	George McGovern	160,584	38.48	—			4	
1968	Richard Nixon	169,254	43.07	**Hubert Humphrey**	217,312	55.3	George Wallace	6,370	1.62	4	
1964	**Lyndon B. Johnson**	262,264	68.84	Barry Goldwater	118,701	31.16	—			4	
1960	John F. Kennedy	181,159	42.95	**Richard Nixon**	240,608	57.05	—			5	
1956	**Dwight D. Eisenhower**	249,238	70.87	Adlai Stevenson II	102,468	29.13	T. Coleman Andrews/ Unpledged Electors (Note: Was allied with a slate of unpledged electors in Louisiana, Mississippi and South Carolina)	-		5	
1952	**Dwight D. Eisenhower**	232,353	66.05	Adlai Stevenson II	118,806	33.77	—			5	
1948	Harry S. Truman	111,916	42.27	**Thomas E. Dewey**	150,234	56.74	Strom Thurmond	—		5	
1944	Franklin D. Roosevelt	140,631	47.45	**Thomas E. Dewey**	155,434	52.44	—			5	
1940	Franklin D. Roosevelt	156,478	48.77	**Wendell Willkie**	163,951	51.1	—			5	
1936	Franklin D. Roosevelt	126,333	41.52	**Alf Landon**	168,823	55.49	—			5	
1932	Franklin D. Roosevelt	128,907	43.19	**Herbert Hoover**	166,631	55.83	—			5	
1928	**Herbert Hoover**	179,923	68.63	Al Smith	81,179	30.96	—			6	
1924	**Calvin Coolidge**	138,440	72.03	John W. Davis	41,964	21.83	Robert M. La Follette	11,382	5.92	6	
1920	**Warren G. Harding**	136,355	68.92	James M. Cox	58,961	29.8	Parley P. Christensen	—	—	6	
1916	Woodrow Wilson	64,033	46.97	**Charles E. Hughes**	69,508	50.99	—			6	
1912	**Woodrow Wilson**	51,113	39.43	Theodore Roosevelt	48,495	37.41	William H. Taft	26,545	20.48	6	
1908	**William H. Taft**	66,987	63	William Jennings Bryan	35,403	33.29	—			6	
1904	**Theodore Roosevelt**	65,432	67.44	Alton B. Parker	27,642	28.49	—			6	
1900	**William McKinley**	65,412	61.89	William Jennings Bryan	36,822	34.84	—			6	
1896	**William McKinley**	80,403	67.9	William Jennings Bryan	34,587	29.21	—			6	
1892	Grover Cleveland	48,049	41.26	**Benjamin Harrison**	62,936	54.05	James B. Weaver	2,396	2.06	6	
1888	**Benjamin Harrison**	73,730	57.49	Grover Cleveland	50,472	39.35	—			6	
1884	Grover Cleveland	52,153	39.97	**James G. Blaine**	72,217	55.34	—			6	
1880	**James A. Garfield**	74,052	51.46	Winfield S. Hancock	65,211	45.32	James B. Weaver	4,409	3.06	7	
1876	**Rutherford B. Hayes**	66,300	56.64	Samuel J. Tilden	49,917	42.65	—			7	
1872	**Ulysses S. Grant**	61,426	67.86	Horace Greeley	29,097	32.14	—			7	
1868	**Ulysses S. Grant**	70,502	62.4	Horatio Seymour	42,460	37.6	—			7	
1864	**Abraham Lincoln**	67,805	59.1	George B. McClellan	46,992	40.9	—			7	

== Election of 1860 ==
The election of 1860 was a complex realigning election in which the breakdown of the previous two-party alignment culminated in four parties each competing for influence in different parts of the country. The result of the election, with the victory of an opponent of slavery, was considered a threat by southern states seeking to use the federal government to enforce their pro-slavery laws in northern states among other factors. Soon after this election, eleven states seceded and the American Civil War began.

Year	Winner (nationally)	Votes	Percent	Runner-up (nationally)	Votes	Percent	Runner-up (nationally)	Votes	Percent	Runner-up (nationally)	Votes	Percent	Electoral Votes
1860	**Abraham Lincoln**	62,811	62.2	Stephen A. Douglas	29,693	29.4	John C. Breckinridge	6,368	6.3	John Bell	2,046	2.0	8

== Elections from 1828 to 1856 ==
Year	Winner (nationally)	Votes	Percent	Runner-up (nationally)	Votes	Percent	Other national candidates	Votes	Percenph	Electoral Votes	Notes
1856	James Buchanan	39,140	35.68	**John C. Frémont**	67,279	61.34	Millard Fillmore	3,270	2.98	8	
1852	**Franklin Pierce**	41,609	50.63	Winfield Scott	32,543	39.6	John P. Hale	8,030	9.77	8	
1848	Zachary Taylor	35,273	40.25	**Lewis Cass**	40,195	45.87	Martin Van Buren	12,157	13.87	9	
1844	**James K. Polk**	45,719	53.83	Henry Clay	34,378	40.48	—			9	
1840	**William Henry Harrison**	46,612	50.23	Martin Van Buren	46,190	49.77	—			10	
1836	**Martin Van Buren**	22,825	58.92	William Henry Harrison	14,803	38.21	various (Note: Three other candidates ran and received electoral votes nationally as part of the unsuccessful Whig strategy to defeat Martin Van Buren by running four candidates with local appeal in different regions of the country. The others were Hugh Lawson White, Daniel Webster, and Willie Person Mangum. None of these candidates appeared on the ballot in Maine.)			10	
1832	**Andrew Jackson**	33,978	54.67	Henry Clay	27,331	43.97	William Wirt	844	1.36	10	
1828	Andrew Jackson	13,927	40.03	**John Quincy Adams**	20,773	59.71	—			9	Electoral vote split 8 to 1.

== Election of 1824 ==
The election of 1824 was a complex realigning election following the collapse of the prevailing Democratic-Republican Party, resulting in four different candidates each claiming to carry the banner of the party, and competing for influence in different parts of the country. The election was the only one in history to be decided by the House of Representatives under the provisions of the Twelfth Amendment to the United States Constitution after no candidate secured a majority of the electoral vote. It was also the only presidential election in which the candidate who received a plurality of electoral votes (Andrew Jackson) did not become president, a source of great bitterness for Jackson and his supporters, who proclaimed the election of Adams a corrupt bargain.

Year	Winner (nationally)	Votes	Percent	Runner-up (nationally)	Votes	Percent	Runner-up (nationally)	Votes	Percent	Runner-up (nationally)	Votes	Percent	Electoral Votes
1824	Andrew Jackson	no ballots		**John Quincy Adams**	10,289	81.50	Henry Clay	no ballots		William H. Crawford	2,336	18.50	9

== Election of 1820 ==
In the election of 1820, incumbent President James Monroe ran effectively unopposed, winning all electoral votes (including Maine’s nine electoral votes) except one vote in New Hampshire. The popular vote was primarily directed to filling the office of vice president.

== See also ==
- Elections in Maine
- United States presidential elections in Nebraska
