= 1976 United States presidential election in Maine =

- November 2, 1976

Nominee	Gerald Ford	Jimmy Carter
Party	Republican	Democratic
Home state	Michigan	Georgia
Running mate	Bob Dole	Walter Mondale
Electoral vote	4	0
Popular vote	236,320	232,279
Percentage	48.91%	48.07%

Ford
40–50%
50–60%
60–70%
70–80%
90–100%
Carter
30–40%
40–50%
50–60%
60–70%
70–80%
80–90%
90–100%
Tie
40–50%
President before election
Gerald Ford
Republican
Elected President
Jimmy Carter
Democratic

The 1976 presidential election in Maine took place on November 2, 1976, as part of the 1976 United States presidential election, which took place across all 50 states plus the District of Columbia. Voters chose four representatives, or electors to the electoral college, to vote for president and vice president.

Maine narrowly voted for incumbent Republican president Gerald Ford over his Democratic opponent, Georgia Governor Jimmy Carter. Ford took 48.91% of the vote to Carter’s 48.07%, a victory margin of 0.84%. The anti-war former Democratic senator from Minnesota, Eugene McCarthy, received 2.21% of the vote in Maine, which possibly helped Ford carry the state, as he most likely siphoned more votes from Carter than Ford.

Despite his narrow loss nationwide, Ford actually managed to carry four of the six New England states. Carter only won the heavily Democratic states of Massachusetts and Rhode Island, which made New England Ford's second strongest region in the nation after the West.

As of the 2024 presidential election, this is the last time that a Democrat won the national election without carrying Maine, and the last time until 2020 when a Democrat won without carrying Maine's 2nd congressional district, since the state moved from being a winner take all one four years earlier in 1972.

== Results ==
Electoral results
Presidential candidate	Party	Home state	Popular vote		Electoral vote	Running mate		
Presidential candidate	Party	Home state	Count	Percentage	Electoral vote	Vice-presidential candidate	Home state	Electoral vote
Gerald Ford (incumbent)	Republican	Michigan	236,320	48.91%	4	Robert Dole	Kansas	4
Jimmy Carter	Democrat	Georgia	232,279	48.07%	0	Walter Mondale	Minnesota	0
Eugene McCarthy	Independent	Minnesota	10,874	2.25%	0	—	—	0
Benjamin Bubar	Prohibition	Maine	3,495	0.72%	0	Earl Dodge	Colorado	0
Write-in candidates	—	—	179	0.04%	0	—	—	0
Thomas J. Anderson	—	Tennessee	27	0.01%	0	Rufus Shackelford	Florida	0
Gus Hall	—	New York	14	0.00%	0	Jarvis Tyner	Pennsylvania	0
Roger MacBride	—	Virginia	10	0.00%	0	David Bergland	California	0
Lester Maddox	—	Georgia	8	0.00%	0	William Dyke	Wisconsin	0
Peter Camejo	—	New York	1	0.00%	0	Willie Mae Reid	Illinois	0
Julius Levin	—	New Jersey	1	0.00%	0	Constance Blomen		0
Total			483,208	100%	4			4
Needed to win					270			270

=== Results by congressional district ===
Ford won both of Maine's congressional districts.

District	Ford	Carter	Representative
1st	49.22%	47.90%	David F. Emery
2nd	48.54%	48.27%	William Cohen

=== Results by county ===
County	Gerald Ford Republican		Jimmy Carter Democratic		Eugene McCarthy Independent		Benjamin Bubar Prohibition		Various candidates Write-ins		Margin		Total votes cast
County	#	%	#	%	#	%	#	%	#	%	#	%	Total votes cast
Androscoggin	16,330	37.40%	26,484	60.65%	670	1.53%	175	0.40%	6	0.01%	-10,154	-23.25%	43,665
Aroostook	15,550	48.52%	15,484	48.31%	495	1.54%	515	1.61%	7	0.02%	66	0.21%	32,051
Cumberland	48,959	49.64%	47,007	47.66%	2,329	2.36%	315	0.32%	16	0.02%	1,952	1.98%	98,626
Franklin	5,799	50.94%	5,140	45.15%	318	2.79%	118	1.04%	9	0.08%	659	5.79%	11,384
Hancock	12,064	61.40%	6,725	34.23%	596	3.03%	241	1.23%	21	0.11%	5,339	27.17%	19,647
Kennebec	22,534	47.53%	23,473	49.51%	1,002	2.11%	372	0.78%	26	0.05%	-939	-1.98%	47,407
Knox	8,315	56.24%	5,922	40.05%	414	2.80%	129	0.87%	6	0.04%	2,393	16.19%	14,786
Lincoln	7,554	59.03%	4,818	37.65%	366	2.86%	49	0.38%	10	0.08%	2,736	21.38%	12,797
Oxford	10,551	49.04%	10,340	48.06%	459	2.13%	129	0.60%	37	0.17%	211	0.98%	21,516
Penobscot	29,016	52.17%	24,672	44.36%	1,367	2.46%	533	0.96%	25	0.04%	4,344	7.81%	55,613
Piscataquis	4,084	50.48%	3,727	46.07%	173	2.14%	103	1.27%	3	0.04%	357	4.41%	8,090
Sagadahoc	5,988	50.42%	5,529	46.56%	287	2.42%	63	0.53%	9	0.08%	459	3.86%	11,876
Somerset	8,868	46.76%	9,465	49.91%	464	2.45%	158	0.83%	11	0.06%	-597	-3.15%	18,966
Waldo	6,289	54.06%	4,853	41.72%	348	2.99%	131	1.13%	12	0.10%	1,436	12.34%	11,633
Washington	7,039	49.45%	6,644	46.67%	307	2.16%	242	1.70%	3	0.02%	395	2.78%	14,235
York	27,380	44.95%	31,996	52.52%	1,279	2.10%	222	0.36%	39	0.06%	-4,616	-7.57%	60,916
Totals	236,320	48.91%	232,279	48.07%	10,874	2.25%	3,495	0.72%	240	0.05%	4,041	0.84%	483,208

==== Counties that flipped from Republican to Democratic ====
- Kennebec
- Somerset
- York

== See also ==
- United States presidential elections in Maine
