= 1928 United States presidential election in Maine =

- November 6, 1928

Nominee	Herbert Hoover	Al Smith
Party	Republican	Democratic
Home state	California	New York
Running mate	Charles Curtis	Joseph Taylor Robinson
Electoral vote	6	0
Popular vote	179,923	81,179
Percentage	68.63%	30.96%
County results
Hoover
50–60%
60–70%
70–80%
80–90%
President before election
Calvin Coolidge
Republican
Elected President
Herbert Hoover
Republican

The 1928 United States presidential election in Maine took place on November 6, 1928, as part of the 1928 United States presidential election which was held throughout all contemporary forty-eight states. Voters chose six representatives, or electors to the Electoral College, who voted for president and vice president.

Maine voted for the Republican nominee, former Secretary of Commerce Herbert Hoover of California, over the Democratic nominee, Governor Alfred E. Smith of New York. Hoover's running mate was Senate Majority Leader Charles Curtis of Kansas, while Smith ran with Senator Joseph Taylor Robinson of Arkansas.

Hoover won Maine by a margin of 37.67%, making Maine his third-strongest state after Kansas and Michigan.

== Results ==
1928 United States presidential election in Maine
Party	Candidate	Running mate	Popular vote		Electoral vote	
Party	Candidate	Running mate	Count	%	Count	%
Republican	Herbert Hoover of California	Charles Curtis of Kansas	179,923	68.63%	6	100.00%
Democratic	Al Smith of New York	Joseph Taylor Robinson of Arkansas	81,179	30.96%	0	0.00%
Socialist	Norman Thomas of New York	James Hudson Maurer of Pennsylvania	1,068	0.40%	0	0.00%
N/A	Others	Others	1	0.01%	0	0.00%
Total			262,171	100.00%	6	100.00%

=== Results by county ===
County	Herbert Clark Hoover Republican		Alfred Emmanuel Smith Democratic		Norman Mattoon Thomas Socialist		Margin		Total votes cast
County	#	%	#	%	#	%	#	%	Total votes cast
Androscoggin	11,790	51.59%	10,940	47.87%	124	0.54%	850	3.72%	22,854
Aroostook	14,545	71.45%	5,771	28.35%	41	0.20%	8,774	43.10%	20,357
Cumberland	33,190	67.74%	15,648	31.94%	157	0.32%	17,542	35.80%	48,995
Franklin	4,923	76.54%	1,487	23.12%	22	0.34%	3,436	53.42%	6,432
Hancock	8,140	81.84%	1,773	17.83%	33	0.33%	6,367	64.01%	9,946
Kennebec	15,541	65.14%	8,226	34.48%	92	0.39%	7,315	30.66%	23,859
Knox	6,660	73.35%	2,332	25.68%	88	0.97%	4,328	47.67%	9,080
Lincoln	4,470	78.85%	1,181	20.83%	18	0.32%	3,289	58.02%	5,669
Oxford	9,409	69.76%	4,015	29.77%	63	0.47%	5,394	39.99%	13,487
Penobscot	21,750	70.25%	9,114	29.44%	96	0.31%	12,636	40.81%	30,960
Piscataquis	4,792	77.78%	1,353	21.96%	16	0.26%	3,439	55.82%	6,161
Sagadahoc	3,518	73.26%	1,084	22.57%	200	4.16%	2,434	50.69%	4,802
Somerset	8,055	70.62%	3,251	28.50%	100	0.88%	4,804	42.12%	11,406
Waldo	4,851	77.07%	1,402	22.28%	41	0.65%	3,449	54.79%	6,294
Washington	8,531	73.30%	3,073	26.40%	35	0.30%	5,458	46.90%	11,639
York	18,671	64.78%	10,030	34.80%	119	0.41%	8,641	29.98%	28,820
Totals	178,836	68.58%	80,680	30.94%	1,245	0.48%	98,156	37.64%	260,761

== See also ==
- United States presidential elections in Maine
