= 1824 United States presidential election in Maine =

- October 26 – December 2, 1824
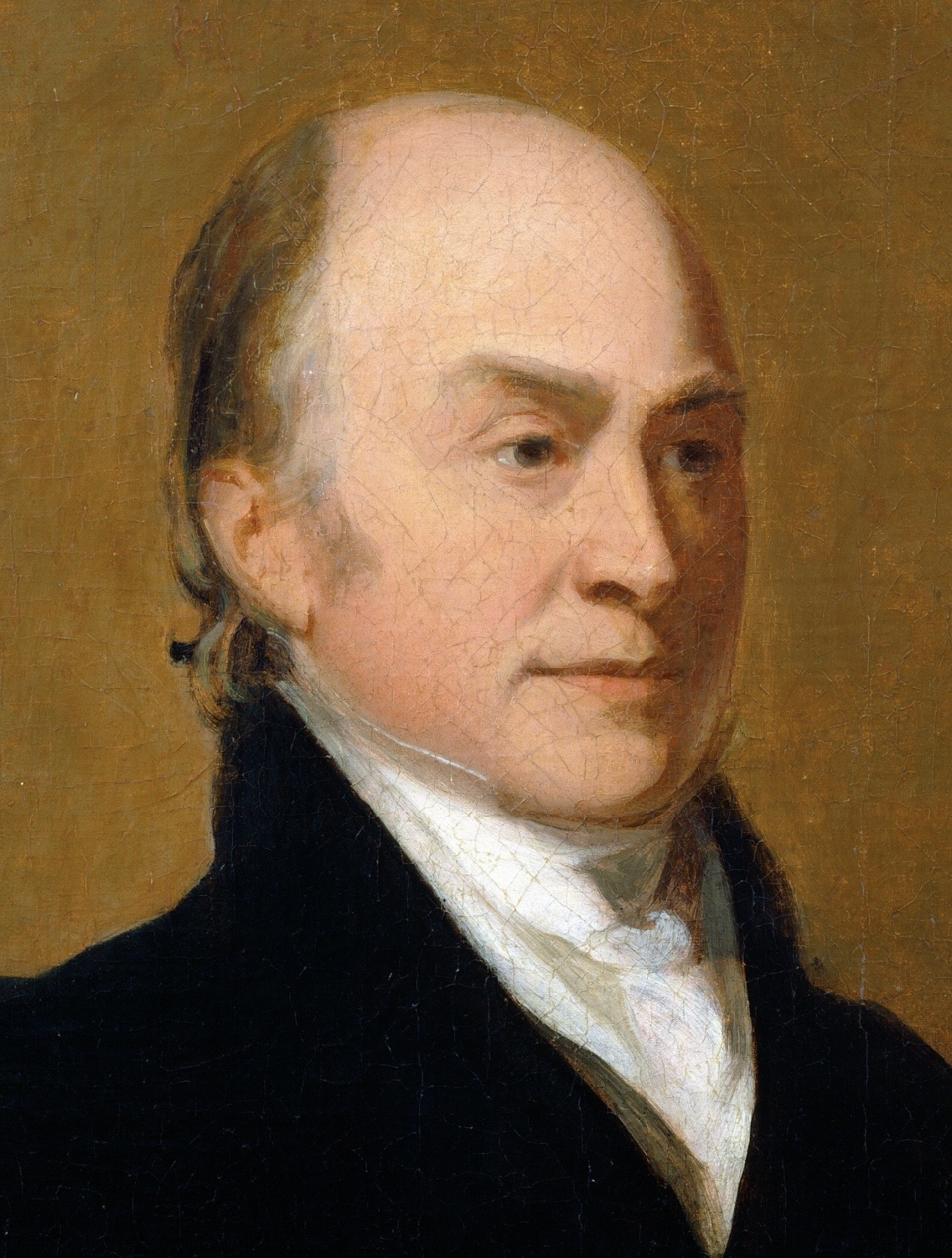

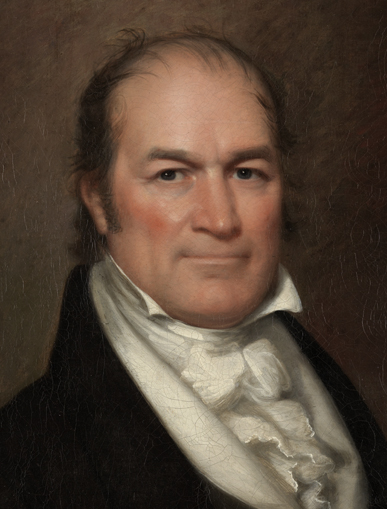
Nominee	John Quincy Adams	William H. Crawford
Party	Democratic-Republican	Democratic-Republican
Alliance	Adams-Clay Republican	Old Republican
Home state	Massachusetts	Georgia
Running mate	John C. Calhoun	Nathaniel Macon
Electoral vote	9	0
Popular vote	10,289	2,336
Percentage	81.50%	18.50%
County results
Adams
50–60%
70–80%
80–90%
90–100%
President before election
James Monroe
Democratic-Republican
Elected President
John Quincy Adams
Democratic-Republican

The 1824 United States presidential election in Maine took place between October 26 and December 2, 1824, as part of the 1824 United States presidential election. Voters chose nine representatives, or electors to the Electoral College, who voted for president and vice president.

During this election, the Democratic-Republican Party was the only major national party, and four different candidates from this party sought the presidency. Maine voted for John Quincy Adams over William H. Crawford. Adams won Maine by a margin of 63.0%.

== Results ==
1824 United States presidential election in Maine
Party	Candidate	Votes	Percentage	Electoral votes
Democratic-Republican	John Quincy Adams	10,289	81.50%	9
Democratic-Republican	William H. Crawford	2,336	18.50%	0
Totals		12,625	100.0%	9

== See also ==
- United States presidential elections in Maine
