= Lincoln County, Maine =

County in Maine, United States

- County
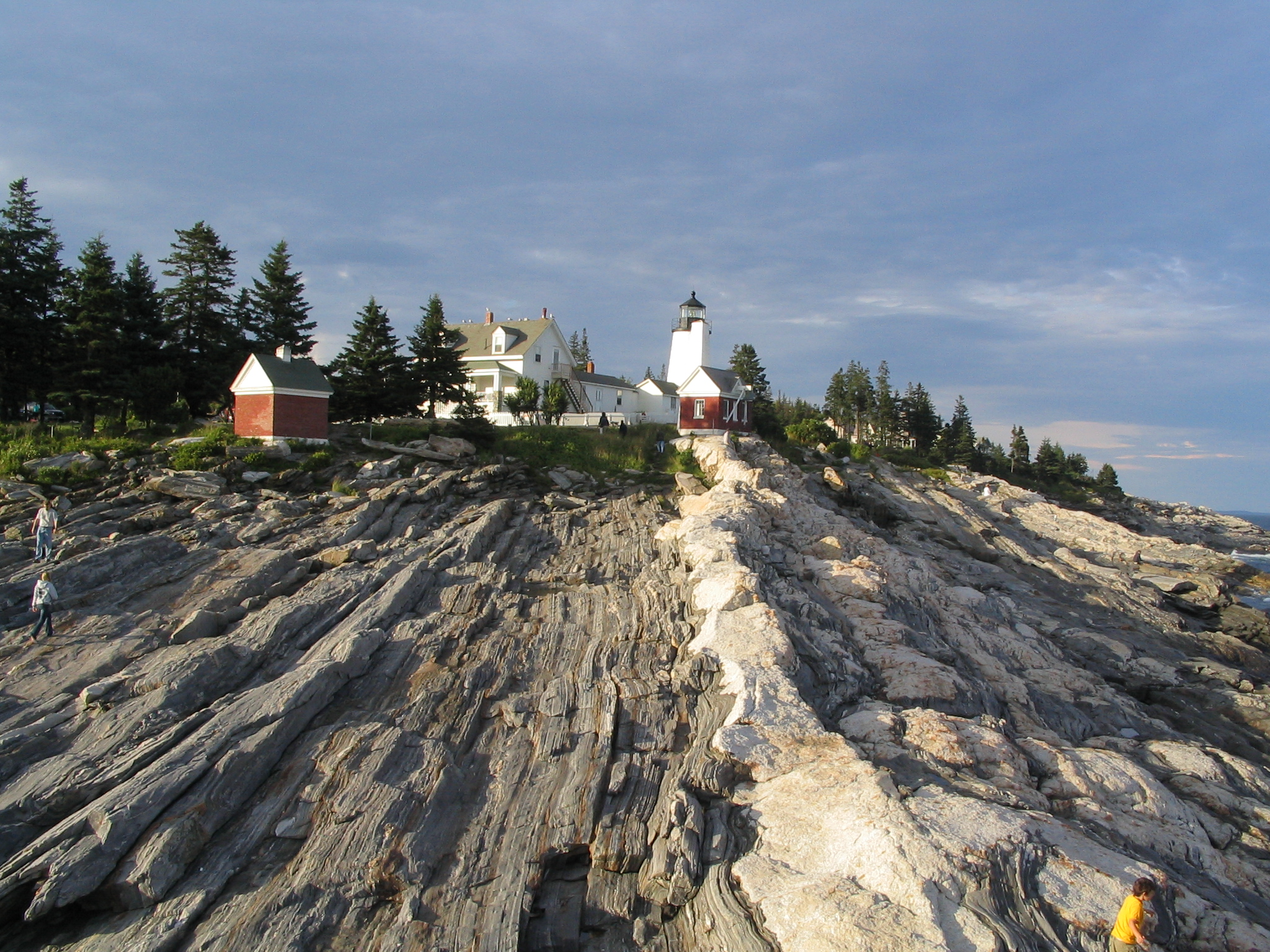
- Pemaquid Point Light, featured on the Maine State Quarter

- Flag

- Location within the U.S. state of Maine
- Coordinates: 44°00′49″N 69°32′31″W
- Country: United States
- State: Maine
- Founded: November 1, 1760; 265 years ago
- Named for: Lincoln, England
- Seat: Wiscasset
- Largest town: Waldoboro

Area
  - Total: 700 sq mi (1,800 km^{2})
  - Land: 456 sq mi (1,180 km^{2})
  - Water: 244 sq mi (630 km^{2}) 35%

Population (2020)
  - Total: 35,237
  - Estimate (2025): 36,595 ▲
  - Density: 77.3/sq mi (29.8/km^{2})
- Time zone: UTC−5 (Eastern)
  - Summer (DST): UTC−4 (EDT)
- Congressional district: 1st
- Website: lincolncountymaine.me

Lincoln County is a county located in the U.S. state of Maine. As of the 2020 census, the population was 35,237. Its seat is Wiscasset. The county was founded in 1760 by the Massachusetts General Court from a portion of York County, Massachusetts and named after the English city Lincoln, the birthplace of Massachusetts Bay Provincial Governor Thomas Pownall.

At its founding, Lincoln County accounted for three-fifths of the state's land, and stretched east to Nova Scotia. Thirteen counties were cut out of this land including Sagadahoc County to the west and a portion of Kennebec County to the north. The county flag is a traditional New England flag, adopted in 1977.

== Geography ==
According to the U.S. Census Bureau, the county has a total area of 700 square miles (1,800 km^{2}), of which 456 square miles (1,180 km^{2}) is land and 244 square miles (630 km^{2}) (35%) is water. It is the third-smallest county in Maine by area.

Crummett Mountain in Somerville is the tallest mountain located entirely within the county, at 538 feet (164 m) above sea level.

== Demographics ==
Historical population
Census	Pop.	Note	%±
1790	29,733		—
1800	30,225		1.7%
1810	42,992		42.2%
1820	53,189		23.7%
1830	57,192		7.5%
1840	63,517		11.1%
1850	74,875		17.9%
1860	27,860		−62.8%
1870	25,597		−8.1%
1880	24,821		−3.0%
1890	21,996		−11.4%
1900	19,669		−10.6%
1910	18,216		−7.4%
1920	15,976		−12.3%
1930	15,498		−3.0%
1940	16,294		5.1%
1950	18,004		10.5%
1960	18,497		2.7%
1970	20,537		11.0%
1980	25,691		25.1%
1990	30,357		18.2%
2000	33,616		10.7%
2010	34,457		2.5%
2020	35,237		2.3%
2025 (est.)	36,595	▲	3.9%
U.S. Decennial Census; 1790–1960 1900–1990; 1990–2000 2010–2016 2018

=== 2020 census ===
As of the 2020 census, the county had a population of 35,237. Of the residents, 16.4% were under the age of 18 and 29.5% were 65 years of age or older; the median age was 52.2 years. For every 100 females there were 96.9 males, and for every 100 females age 18 and over there were 94.8 males. 8.7% of residents lived in urban areas and 91.3% lived in rural areas.

The racial makeup of the county was 94.3% White, 0.5% Black or African American, 0.3% American Indian and Alaska Native, 0.7% Asian, 0.0% Native Hawaiian and Pacific Islander, 0.4% from some other race, and 3.9% from two or more races. Hispanic or Latino residents of any race comprised 1.1% of the population.

There were 15,803 households in the county, of which 21.4% had children under the age of 18 living with them and 24.4% had a female householder with no spouse or partner present. About 30.2% of all households were made up of individuals and 16.9% had someone living alone who was 65 years of age or older.

There were 23,608 housing units, of which 33.1% were vacant. Among occupied housing units, 81.3% were owner-occupied and 18.7% were renter-occupied. The homeowner vacancy rate was 1.4% and the rental vacancy rate was 9.9%.

Lincoln County, Maine – Racial and ethnic composition Note: the US Census treats Hispanic/Latino as an ethnic category. This table excludes Latinos from the racial categories and assigns them to a separate category. Hispanics/Latinos may be of any race.
Race / Ethnicity (NH = Non-Hispanic)	Pop 2000	Pop 2010	Pop 2020	% 2000	% 2010	% 2020
White alone (NH)	32,986	33,437	33,071	98.12%	97.03%	93.85%
Black or African American alone (NH)	56	96	156	0.16%	0.27%	0.44%
Native American or Alaska Native alone (NH)	83	107	105	0.24%	0.31%	0.29%
Asian alone (NH)	123	185	227	0.36%	0.53%	0.64%
Pacific Islander alone (NH)	8	0	9	0.02%	0.00%	0.02%
Other race alone (NH)	7	14	97	0.02%	0.04%	0.27%
Mixed race or Multiracial (NH)	198	331	1,177	0.58%	0.96%	3.34%
Hispanic or Latino (any race)	155	287	395	0.46%	0.83%	1.12%
Total	33,616	34,457	35,237	100.00%	100.00%	100.00%

=== 2010 census ===
As of the 2010 United States census, there were 34,457 people, 15,149 households, and 9,749 families living in the county. The population density was 75.6 inhabitants per square mile (29.2/km^{2}). There were 23,493 housing units at an average density of 51.5 units per square mile (19.9 units/km^{2}). The racial makeup of the county was 97.6% white, 0.5% Asian, 0.3% American Indian, 0.3% black or African American, 0.1% from other races, and 1.1% from two or more races. Those of Hispanic or Latino origin made up 0.8% of the population. In terms of ancestry, 30.4% were English, 17.7% were Irish, 13.4% were German, 8.6% were Scottish, and 8.5% were American.

Of the 15,149 households, 24.7% had children under the age of 18 living with them, 51.6% were married couples living together, 8.8% had a female householder with no husband present, 35.6% were non-families, and 28.9% of all households were made up of individuals. The average household size was 2.24 and the average family size was 2.72. The median age was 48.1 years.

The median income for a household in the county was $47,678 and the median income for a family was $58,028. Males had a median income of $40,816 versus $31,473 for females. The per capita income for the county was $28,003. About 7.7% of families and 10.8% of the population were below the poverty line, including 16.2% of those under age 18 and 9.9% of those age 65 or over.

=== 2000 census ===
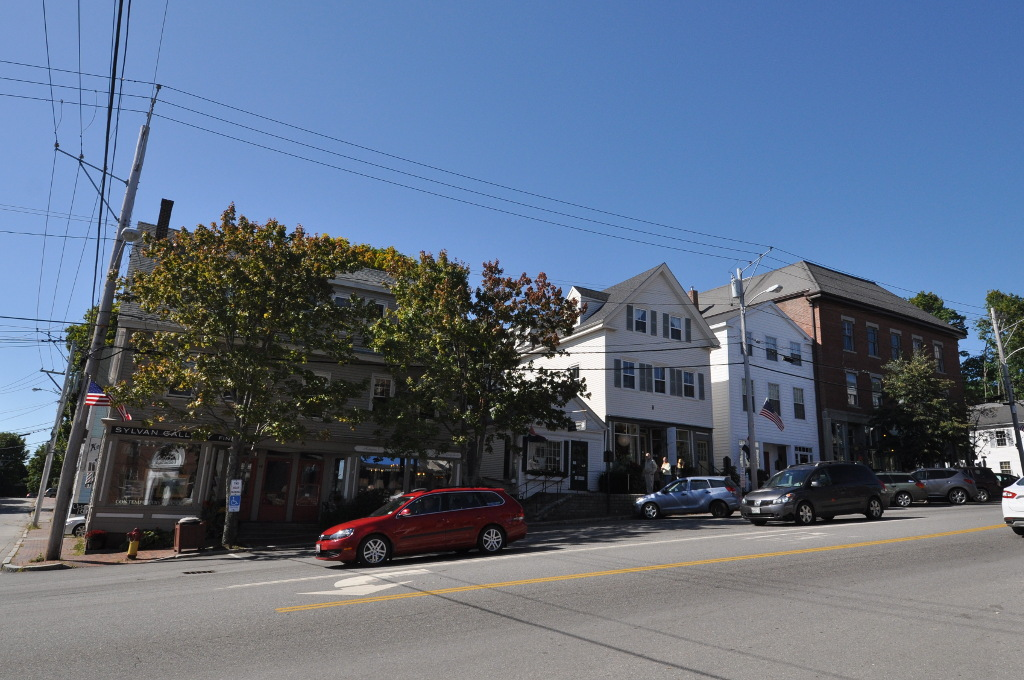
Main Street Wiscasset, the county seat

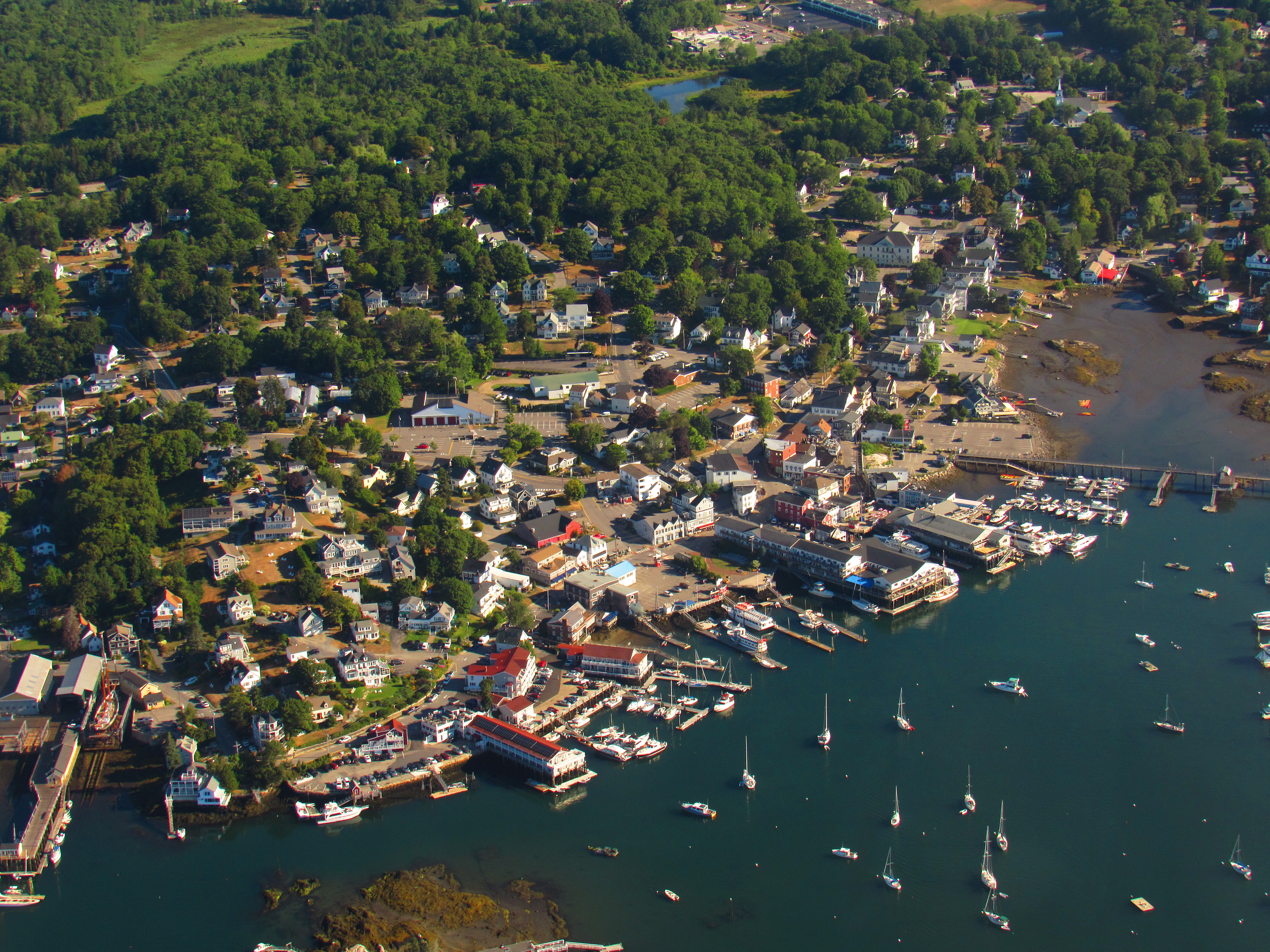
Downtown Boothbay Harbor

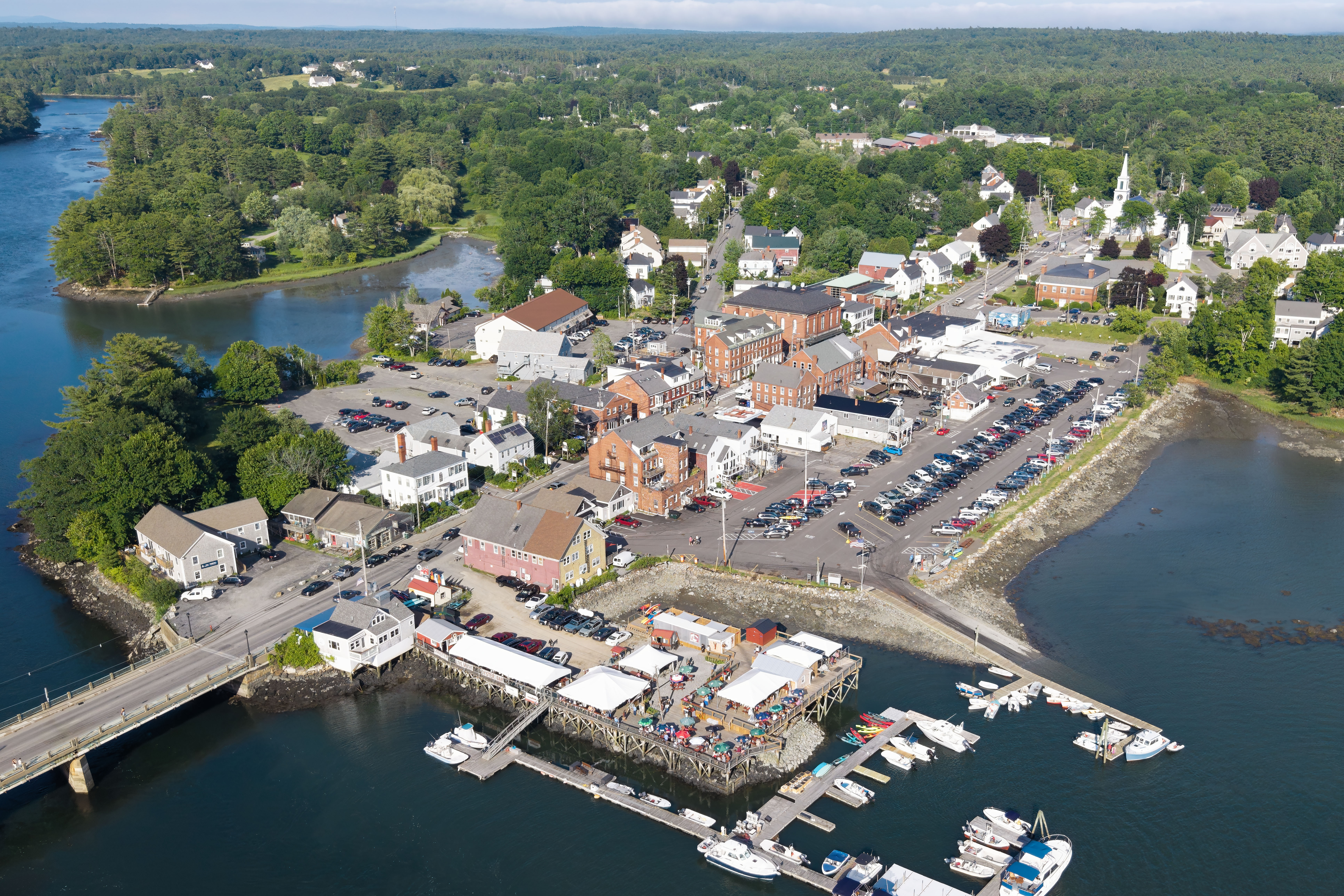
Damariscotta village

As of the 2000 census, there were 14,158 households, and 9,542 families living in the county. The population density was 74 people per square mile (29 people/km^{2}). There were 20,849 housing units at an average density of 46 per square mile (18/km^{2}). The racial makeup of the county was 98.46% White, 0.17% Black or African American, 0.26% Native American, 0.37% Asian, 0.02% Pacific Islander, 0.10% from other races, and 0.61% from two or more races. 0.46% of the population were Hispanic or Latino of any race. 25.3% were of English, 15.4% United States or American, 11.2% Irish, 9.0% German and 7.3% French ancestry. Most of those claiming to be of "American" ancestry are actually of English descent, but have family that has been in the country for so long, in many cases since the early seventeenth century that they choose to identify simply as "American". 97.7% spoke English and 1.0% French as their first language.

There were 14,158 households, out of which 28.20% had children under the age of 18 living with them, 56.10% were married couples living together, 7.70% had a female householder with no husband present, and 32.60% were non-families. 26.70% of all households were made up of individuals, and 12.10% had someone living alone who was 65 years of age or older. The average household size was 2.35 and the average family size was 2.82.

In the county, the population was spread out, with 22.70% under the age of 18, 5.50% from 18 to 24, 25.60% from 25 to 44, 28.10% from 45 to 64, and 18.20% who were 65 years of age or older. The median age was 43 years. For every 100 females there were 95.10 males. For every 100 females age 18 and over, there were 92.00 males.

The median income for a household in the county was $38,686, and the median income for a family was $45,427. Males had a median income of $31,209 versus $23,161 for females. The per capita income for the county was $20,760. About 6.60% of families and 10.10% of the population were below the poverty line, including 12.80% of those under age 18 and 9.50% of those age 65 or over.

== Politics ==
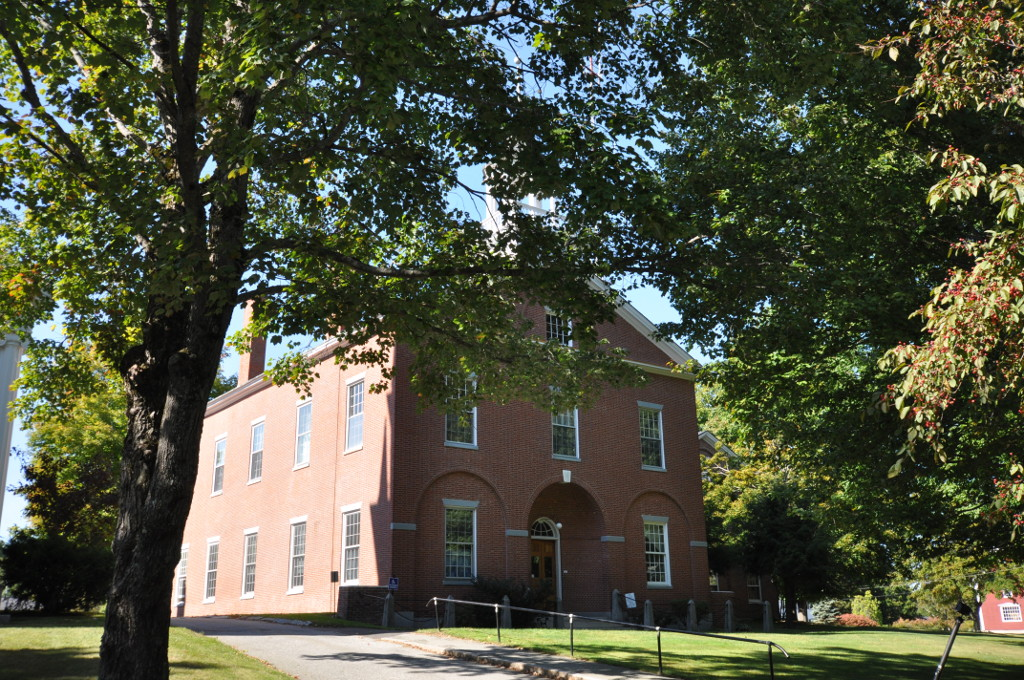
Lincoln County Courthouse in Wiscasset

Lincoln County was formerly a Republican stronghold, but it became more competitive in the 1990s and since the 2000 election, when George W. Bush carried it by a narrow plurality, it has swung more decisively into the Democratic column. Barack Obama easily won the county in 2008, the best performance by a Democrat since the 1964 national landslide election, and he carried it again by a decent margin in 2012. In 2016, Republican Donald Trump lost the county by only about 2 points, but it has again trended more Democratic in each subsequent election. Lincoln was one of only two counties in Maine to shift leftward between the 2020 and 2024 elections.

=== Voter registration ===
Voter registration and party enrollment as of March 2024
Democratic	9,713	34.98%
Republican	8,558	30.82%
Unenrolled	7,912	28.5%
Green Independent	1,098	3.95%
No Labels	394	1.42%
Libertarian	90	0.32%
Total	27,765	100%

United States presidential election results for Lincoln County, Maine
Year	Republican		Democratic		Third party(ies)	
Year	No.	%	No.	%	No.	%
1908	1,693	56.43%	1,196	39.87%	111	3.70%
1912	457	12.28%	1,633	43.89%	1,631	43.83%
1916	1,781	49.97%	1,718	48.20%	65	1.82%
1920	3,668	73.61%	1,256	25.21%	59	1.18%
1924	3,311	77.36%	878	20.51%	91	2.13%
1928	4,470	78.85%	1,181	20.83%	18	0.32%
1932	4,666	63.84%	2,602	35.60%	41	0.56%
1936	5,252	72.62%	1,850	25.58%	130	1.80%
1940	5,244	68.42%	2,415	31.51%	5	0.07%
1944	4,919	69.97%	2,102	29.90%	9	0.13%
1948	4,743	80.47%	1,095	18.58%	56	0.95%
1952	6,766	83.80%	1,299	16.09%	9	0.11%
1956	7,191	86.07%	1,164	13.93%	0	0.00%
1960	7,562	76.39%	2,337	23.61%	0	0.00%
1964	3,984	43.81%	5,099	56.07%	11	0.12%
1968	5,659	61.11%	3,380	36.50%	222	2.40%
1972	7,580	72.28%	2,903	27.68%	4	0.04%
1976	7,554	59.03%	4,818	37.65%	425	3.32%
1980	7,434	52.14%	4,776	33.49%	2,049	14.37%
1984	10,312	67.68%	4,869	31.96%	55	0.36%
1988	9,837	61.79%	5,939	37.31%	144	0.90%
1992	6,405	33.65%	6,714	35.27%	5,917	31.08%
1996	6,372	35.06%	8,130	44.74%	3,671	20.20%
2000	9,457	48.08%	8,634	43.89%	1,580	8.03%
2004	10,370	46.83%	11,351	51.26%	421	1.90%
2008	9,287	43.03%	11,886	55.07%	411	1.90%
2012	8,899	42.87%	11,315	54.51%	543	2.62%
2016	9,727	45.24%	10,241	47.63%	1,535	7.14%
2020	10,256	43.47%	12,684	53.76%	654	2.77%
2024	10,409	43.37%	13,110	54.62%	484	2.02%

== Communities ==
Today, the largest population centers in Lincoln County are Waldoboro (pop. of 5,075), Boothbay-Boothbay Harbor (pop. of 5,030), Wiscasset (pop. of 3,742), and Damariscotta-Newcastle (pop. of 3,145). Together, these four communities make up 51.06% of the entire population of Lincoln County.

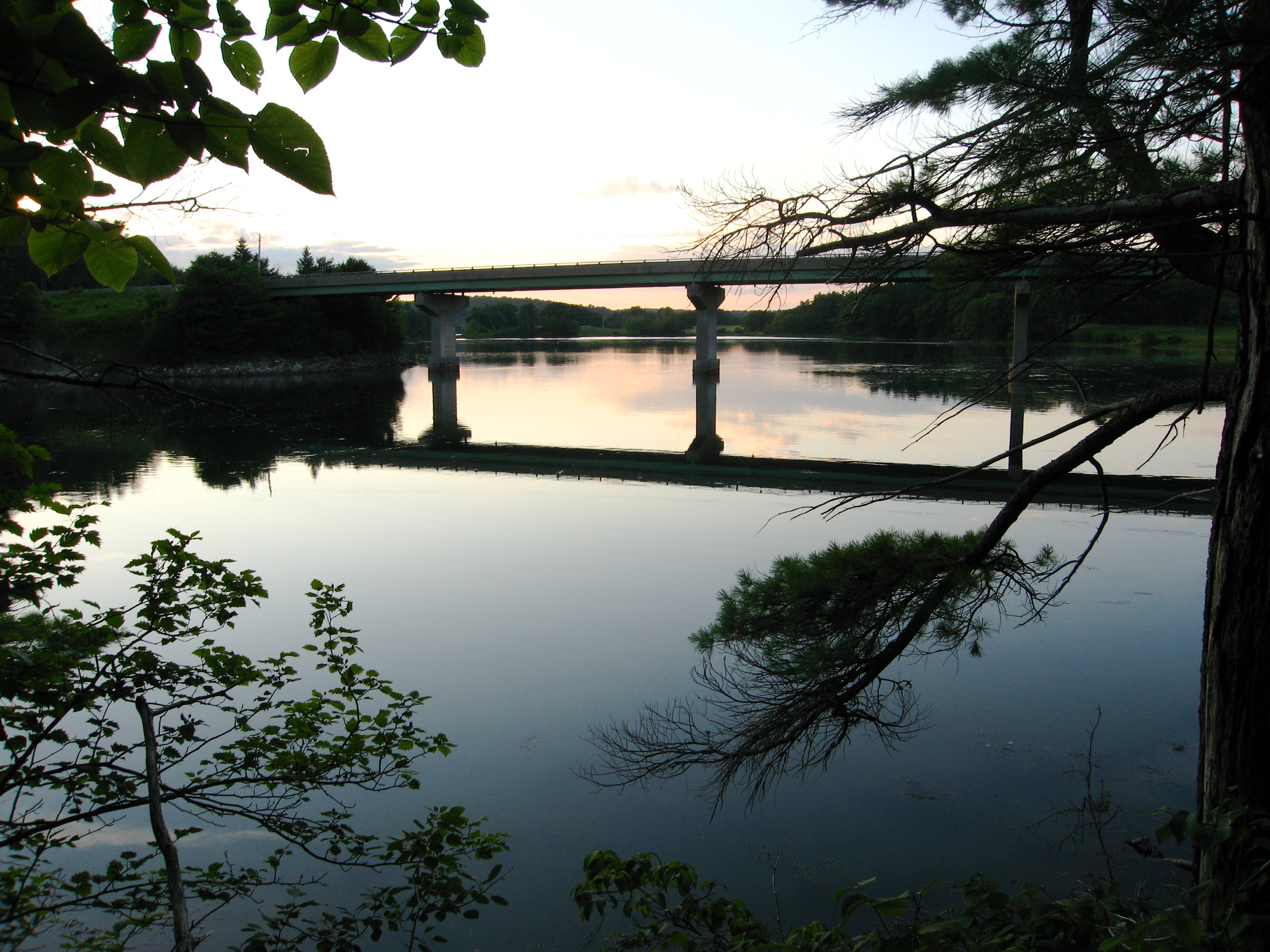
The Damariscotta River near the Whaleback Shell Midden State Historic Site

=== Towns ===
- Alna
- Boothbay
- Boothbay Harbor
- Bremen
- Bristol
- Damariscotta
- Dresden
- Edgecomb
- Jefferson
- Newcastle
- Nobleboro
- Somerville
- South Bristol
- Southport
- Waldoboro
- Westport Island
- Whitefield
- Wiscasset

=== Plantations ===
- Monhegan

=== Unorganized Territories ===
- Hibberts Gore
- Louds Island

=== Census-designated places ===
- Boothbay Harbor
- Damariscotta
- Newcastle
- Waldoboro
- Wiscasset

There are also areas referred to by the U.S. Census Bureau as the "Lincoln Unorganized Territory" and the "Louds Island Unorganized Territory". Unorganized territory is not in any municipality. The Maine Department of Education takes responsibility for coordinating school assignments in the unorganized territory.

== Transportation ==
U.S. Route 1 passes through the county in a northeast–southwest fashion. North-south Maine state routes, notably Maine 27, Maine 129, Maine 130 and Maine 32 travel north to the interior of the county and south to the peninsulas by the coast.

Until 1958, the Maine Central Railroad ran passenger trains from Portland, along the Rockland Branch from Brunswick to Rockland to the east, three trains a day on days besides Sunday and fewer trains on Sunday. Stations consisted of Wiscasset, Newcastle, Damariscotta Mills, Nobleboro, Winslow Mills and Waldoboro. In Portland's Union Station, these trains made connections to trains to Boston, New York City, Bangor and the Canadian Maritimes. In the final months, service diminished to one daily except Sunday trip in each direction, until finally discontinuing on April 4, 1959.

From 2003 to 2015, the Maine Eastern Railroad offered seasonal excursion service to Rockland, Maine which connected to Amtrak's Downeaster at Brunswick. In October 2017, the Northern New England Passenger Rail Authority announced plans to extend one weekend Downeaster round trip to Rockland between Memorial Day and Labor Day beginning in 2018. Intermediate stops would be made at Bath, Wiscasset, and Newcastle. As part of preparation, Amtrak, along with the Northern New England Passenger Rail Authority, Maine Department of Transportation and the Central Maine and & Quebec Railroad, made a test run of a train on August 14.

== Education ==
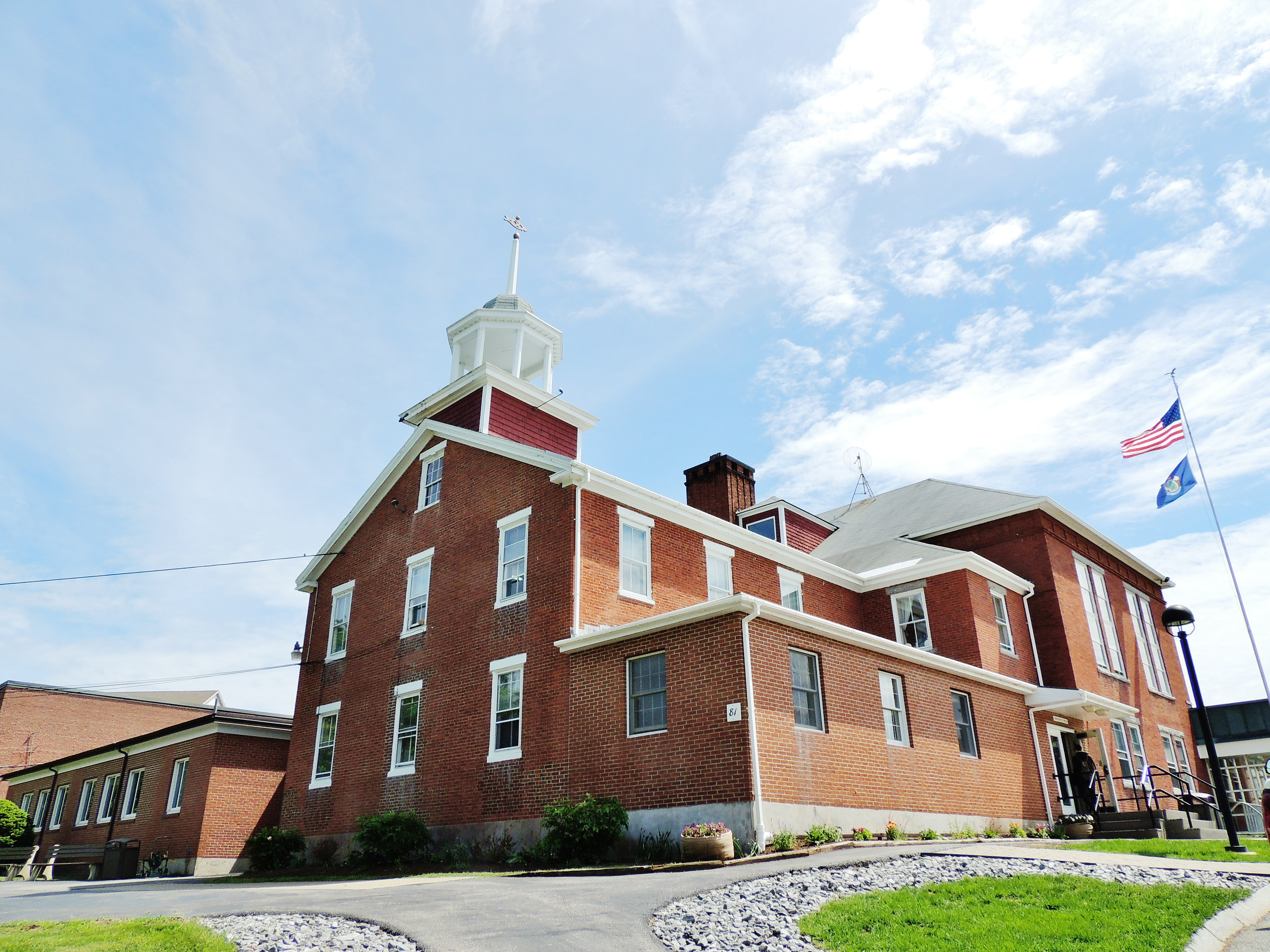
Lincoln Academy in Newcastle.

There are four secondary schools in Lincoln County:

- Boothbay Region High School, Boothbay Harbor
- Lincoln Academy, Newcastle
- Medomak Valley High School, Waldoboro
- Wiscasset High School, Wiscasset

K-12 school districts include:

- Kennebec Intra-District Schools RSU 1
- Medomak Valley RSU 40
- Sheepscot Valley RSU 12
- Rocky Channels School System AOS 98
  - Boothbay-Boothbay Harbor Community School District
  - Edgecomb School District
  - Georgetown School District
  - Southport School District
- Wiscasset School District

Secondary school districts include:

- Bremen School District
- Damariscotta School District
- Newcastle School District

Elementary school districts include:

- Central Lincoln School System AOS 93
  - Bristol School District
  - Jefferson School District
  - Nobleboro School District
  - South Bristol School District
- Great Salt Bay RSU 48
- Monhegan Plantation School District

== See also ==
- National Register of Historic Places listings in Lincoln County, Maine
