= 2008 United States presidential election in Maine =

- November 4, 2008

Nominee	Barack Obama	John McCain
Party	Democratic	Republican
Home state	Illinois	Arizona
Running mate	Joe Biden	Sarah Palin
Electoral vote	4	0
Popular vote	421,923	295,273
Percentage	57.71%	40.38%

Obama
40–50%
50–60%
60–70%
70–80%
80–90%
McCain
40–50%
50–60%
60–70%
70–80%
80–90%
Tie
President before election
George W. Bush
Republican
Elected President
Barack Obama
Democratic

The 2008 United States presidential election in Maine took place on November 4, 2008, and was part of the 2008 United States presidential election.

Maine once again displayed its status as a blue state, with Democrat Barack Obama taking the state with 57.71% of the vote and a difference of 126,650 votes. Maine is one of only two states, along with Nebraska, to not allocate its electoral votes via a winner-take-all system; rather, two electoral votes are allocated to the statewide winner and one for the winner in each individual congressional district. Maine at-large and its 1st district has voted Democratic since 1992, and the 2nd district did the same until Donald Trump won it in 2016, 2020, and 2024. It is also the only state in New England where a county voted for Republican John McCain, with Piscataquis County giving McCain 50.72% of the vote.

== Caucuses ==
- 2008 Maine Democratic presidential caucuses
- 2008 Maine Republican presidential caucuses

== Campaign ==
=== Predictions ===
There were 16 news organizations who made state-by-state predictions of the election. Here are their last predictions before election day:

Source	Ranking
D.C. Political Report	Likely D
Cook Political Report	Solid D
The Takeaway	Solid D
Electoral-vote.com	Solid D
Washington Post	Solid D
Politico	Solid D
RealClearPolitics	Solid D
FiveThirtyEight	Solid D
CQ Politics	Solid D
The New York Times	Solid D
CNN	Lean D
NPR	Solid D
MSNBC	Solid D
Fox News	Likely D
Associated Press	Likely D
Rasmussen Reports	Safe D

=== Polling ===
Obama won every single pre-election poll. The final three polls averaged Obama leading 55% to 39%.

=== Fundraising ===
John McCain raised a total of $465,676 in the state, while Barack Obama raised $2,205,059.

=== Advertising and visits ===
Obama spent $1,216,060, while McCain and the RNC spent $444,529. The Obama ticket did not visit the state, but both McCain and Palin visited Maine once.

== Analysis ==
Maine is located in New England, an area that has become a Democratic Party stronghold. It was once a classic Yankee Republican state. It identified with the newly formed GOP in 1856 and stayed in the GOP fold for most of the next 132 years. The GOP carried the state in all but three elections (1912, 1964 and 1968) from 1856 to 1988. Additionally, Maine and Vermont were the only two states that voted against Franklin D. Roosevelt in all four of his campaigns. However, no Republican presidential nominee has carried Maine since George H. W. Bush in 1988, leading many analysts to reckon the state as part of the solid bloc of blue states in the Northeast. While George W. Bush held the state to single digits in 2000 and 2004, polls in 2008 never showed anything but a significant Obama lead.

Ultimately, Obama won the state by a comfortable margin, taking 57.71% of the vote—the highest percentage by a Democrat in Maine since Lyndon B. Johnson carried it as part of his 44-state landslide in 1964, although Bill Clinton in 1996 won with a wider margin when third parties were a more impactful factor. As evidence of how Democratic Maine has become, George W. Bush at the time was only the second Republican ever to win the White House without carrying Maine, the first being Richard Nixon in 1968 when Maine Senator Edmund Muskie was the Democratic vice-presidential nominee. At the same time, however, incumbent Republican U.S. Senator Susan Collins defeated former Democratic U.S. Representative Tom Allen and won reelection to a third term with 61.33% of the vote. Maine was the only state carried by Obama to elect a Republican to the U.S. Senate in 2008.

The seat in Maine's 1st Congressional District that was vacated by Tom Allen in his unsuccessful bid for the U.S. Senate was retained by Democrat Chellie Pingree. At the state level, Democrats made gains in the Maine Legislature, picking up six seats in the Maine House of Representatives and one seat in the Maine Senate.

== Results ==
2008 United States presidential election in Maine
Party	Candidate	Votes	%	±%
Democratic	Barack Obama; Joe Biden	421,923	57.71%	+4.14%
Republican	John McCain; Sarah Palin	295,273	40.38%	−4.20%
Independent	Ralph Nader; Matt Gonzalez	10,636	1.46%	+0.37%
Green	Cynthia McKinney; Rosa A. Clemente	2,900	0.40%	−
Libertarian	Bob Barr; Wayne A. Root	251	0.03%	−0.23%
Constitution	Chuck Baldwin; Darrell L. Castle	177	0.02%	−0.08%
HeartQuake '08	Jonathan Allen; Jeffrey Stath	3	0.00%	N/A
Total votes		731,163	100.00%	N/A

=== By county ===
County	Barack Obama Democratic		John McCain Republican		Various candidates Other parties		Margin		Total votes cast
County	#	%	#	%	#	%	#	%	Total votes cast
Androscoggin	31,017	56.55%	22,671	41.33%	1,162	2.12%	8,346	15.22%	54,850
Aroostook	19,345	53.75%	15,898	44.17%	751	2.09%	3,447	9.58%	35,994
Cumberland	105,218	64.10%	56,186	34.23%	2,747	1.67%	49,032	29.87%	164,151
Franklin	10,113	58.87%	6,627	38.58%	438	2.55%	3,486	20.29%	17,178
Hancock	18,895	58.74%	12,686	39.44%	584	1.82%	6,209	19.30%	32,165
Kennebec	37,238	56.43%	27,482	41.65%	1,266	1.92%	9,756	14.78%	65,986
Knox	13,728	59.74%	8,816	38.36%	436	1.90%	4,912	21.38%	22,980
Lincoln	11,886	55.07%	9,287	43.03%	411	1.90%	2,599	12.04%	21,584
Oxford	17,940	56.68%	12,863	40.64%	847	2.68%	5,077	16.04%	31,650
Penobscot	41,614	51.72%	37,495	46.60%	1,358	1.69%	4,119	5.12%	80,467
Piscataquis	4,430	46.96%	4,785	50.72%	219	2.32%	-355	-3.76%	9,434
Sagadahoc	12,152	57.05%	8,721	40.94%	428	2.01%	3,431	16.11%	21,301
Somerset	13,335	51.77%	11,867	46.07%	556	2.16%	1,468	5.70%	25,758
Waldo	11,967	54.77%	9,423	43.13%	460	2.10%	2,544	11.64%	21,850
Washington	8,246	49.51%	8,077	48.50%	331	1.99%	169	1.01%	16,654
York	64,799	59.36%	42,389	38.83%	1,973	1.81%	22,410	20.53%	109,161
Total	421,923	57.71%	295,273	40.38%	13,967	1.91%	126,650	17.33%	731,163

Counties that flipped from Republican to Democratic

- Washington (largest borough: Calais)

=== By congressional district ===
Barack Obama won both of Maine's congressional districts.

District	Barack Obama Joe Biden Democratic		John McCain Sarah Palin Republican		Ralph Nader Matt Gonzalez Independent		Cynthia McKinney Rosa A. Clemente Green		Other Candidates		Margin		Representative
District	#	%	#	%	#	%	#	%	#	%	#	%	Representative
1st	232,145	60.51%	144,604	37.69%	5,263	1.37%	1,362	0.36%	252	0.07%	87,541	22.82%	Chellie Pingree
2nd	189,778	54.61%	150,669	43.35%	5,373	1.55%	1,538	0.44%	179	0.05%	39,109	11.25%	Mike Michaud

== Electors ==
Technically the voters of Maine cast their ballots for electors: representatives to the Electoral College. Maine is allocated four electors because it has two congressional districts and two senators. All candidates who appear on the ballot or qualify to receive write-in votes must submit a list of four electors, who pledge to vote for their candidate their running mate. Whoever wins the majority of votes in the state is awarded just two of the electoral votes. The other two electoral votes are based upon the congressional district results. Their chosen electors then vote for president and vice president. Although electors are pledged to their candidate and running mate, they are not obligated to vote for them. An elector who votes for someone other than their candidate is known as a faithless elector.

The electors of each state and the District of Columbia met on December 15, 2008, to cast their votes for president and vice president. The Electoral College itself never meets as one body. Instead, the electors from each state and the District of Columbia met in their respective capitols.

The following were the members of the Electoral College from the state. Since Obama won both congressional districts, all four were pledged to Barack Obama and Joe Biden:

- Robert O'Brien of Portland; worked in a hardware store and had been active with the Democratic Party since 1984
- Jill Duson of Portland; third-term city councilor and former mayor
- Samuel Shapiro of Waterville; party activist since 1953, former state treasurer
- Tracie Reed of Portland; master's candidate in the University of Massachusetts Amherst's architecture program, political organizer

== See also ==
- United States presidential elections in Maine
