= 1968 United States presidential election in Maine =

- November 5, 1968

Nominee	Hubert Humphrey	Richard Nixon
Party	Democratic	Republican
Home state	Minnesota	New York (Note: Although he was born in California and he served as a U.S. senator from California, in 1968 Richard Nixon's official state of residence was New York, because he moved there to practice law after his defeat in the 1962 California gubernatorial election. During his first term as president, Nixon re-established his residency in California. Consequently, most reliable reference books list Nixon's home state as New York in the 1968 election and his home state as California in the 1972 (and 1960) election.)
Running mate	Edmund Muskie	Spiro Agnew
Electoral vote	4	0
Popular vote	217,312	169,254
Percentage	55.30%	43.07%

Humphrey
40–50%
50–60%
60–70%
70–80%
80–90%
90–100%
Nixon
40–50%
50–60%
60–70%
70–80%
80–90%
90–100%
Tie
40–50%
50%
President before election
Lyndon Johnson
Democratic
Elected President
Richard Nixon
Republican

The 1968 United States presidential election in Maine took place on November 5, 1968, as part of the 1968 United States presidential election, which was held throughout all fifty states and D.C. Voters chose four representatives, or electors to the Electoral College, who voted for president and vice president.

Maine was won by incumbent Vice President Hubert Humphrey by twelve percentage points over Republican challenger and former Vice President Richard M. Nixon. Humphrey received 55.30% of the vote in Maine, which equated to 217,312 total votes to Nixon's 43.07% and 169,254 total votes. Despite Nixon squeaking by Humphrey nationwide, the Vice President's decisive victory in Maine made the state about thirteen percentage points more Democratic than the nation as a whole in 1968. Humphrey's win was almost certainly due to the popularity and consequent "favorite son" status in Maine of his running mate Edmund Muskie.

Alabama Governor George Wallace received 6,370 votes on the American Independent ticket with 1.62% of the vote. Despite his significant impact on the election as a whole, Wallace did not have a serious impact in Maine. Indeed, upstate Aroostook County was Wallace's weakest in the nation outside of the District of Columbia where he was not on the ballot.

This election made Nixon the first Republican to ever win the presidency without carrying Maine. It would also prove to be the last time that a Democratic presidential nominee would carry the state until Bill Clinton in 1992, and the last time that a Democrat would win an absolute majority of the popular vote in the state until Clinton also did so in 1996. Humphrey was also the first losing Democrat to carry the state since Lewis Cass in 1848. This and the previous election also marked the first occasion since 1852 that the state voted Democratic in consecutive elections. The state swung heavily towards Richard Nixon in 1972, awarding him over 61 percent of the vote, which no presidential candidate of either party has surpassed since.

This is also the last time, as of the 2024 presidential election, that a Democrat received over 70% of the vote in any Maine county, which Humphrey did in predominantly French-Canadian Androscoggin County.

Along with Washington, Maine was one of only two states that Nixon lost in 1968 that he won in his unsuccessful attempt at the presidency in 1960.

== Results ==
1968 United States presidential election in Maine
Party	Candidate	Votes	Percentage	Electoral votes
Democratic	Hubert Humphrey	217,312	55.30%	4
Republican	Richard Nixon	169,254	43.07%	0
American Independent	George Wallace	6,370	1.62%	0
Totals		392,936	100.00%	4

=== Results by county ===
County	Hubert Humphrey Democratic		Richard Nixon Republican		George Wallace American Independent		Margin		Total votes cast
County	#	%	#	%	#	%	#	%	Total votes cast
Androscoggin	26,820	71.04%	10,390	27.52%	542	1.44%	16,430	43.52%	37,752
Aroostook	15,044	51.46%	13,919	47.61%	273	0.93%	1,125	3.85%	29,236
Cumberland	44,697	57.27%	32,275	41.35%	1,076	1.38%	12,422	15.92%	78,048
Franklin	4,307	50.10%	4,127	48.01%	162	1.89%	180	2.09%	8,596
Hancock	4,979	35.10%	8,929	62.95%	277	1.95%	-3,950	-27.85%	14,185
Kennebec	21,752	56.81%	16,009	41.81%	531	1.38%	5,743	15.00%	38,292
Knox	5,119	42.95%	6,585	55.25%	214	1.80%	-1,466	-12.30%	11,918
Lincoln	3,380	36.50%	5,659	61.11%	222	2.39%	-2,279	-24.61%	9,261
Oxford	10,870	56.39%	8,030	41.66%	375	1.95%	2,840	14.73%	19,275
Penobscot	24,327	54.06%	20,011	44.47%	661	1.47%	4,316	9.59%	44,999
Piscataquis	3,561	51.47%	3,199	46.24%	158	2.29%	362	5.23%	6,918
Sagadahoc	5,553	56.16%	4,126	41.73%	209	2.11%	1,427	14.43%	9,888
Somerset	8,312	54.13%	6,720	43.76%	324	2.11%	1,592	10.37%	15,356
Waldo	3,525	41.08%	4,821	56.19%	234	2.73%	-1,296	-15.11%	8,580
Washington	6,249	52.16%	5,523	46.10%	208	1.74%	726	6.06%	11,980
York	28,817	59.23%	18,931	38.91%	904	1.86%	9,886	20.32%	48,652
Totals	217,312	55.30%	169,254	43.07%	6,370	1.63%	48,058	12.23%	392,936

==== Counties that flipped from Democratic to Republican ====
- Hancock
- Knox
- Lincoln
- Waldo

=== Results by congressional district ===
Humphrey won both congressional seats.

District	Humphrey	Nixon	Wallace
1st	55.1%	43.2%	1.7%
2nd	55.5%	42.9%	1.6%

== See also ==
- United States presidential elections in Maine
