= Hancock County, Maine =

County in Maine, United States

- County
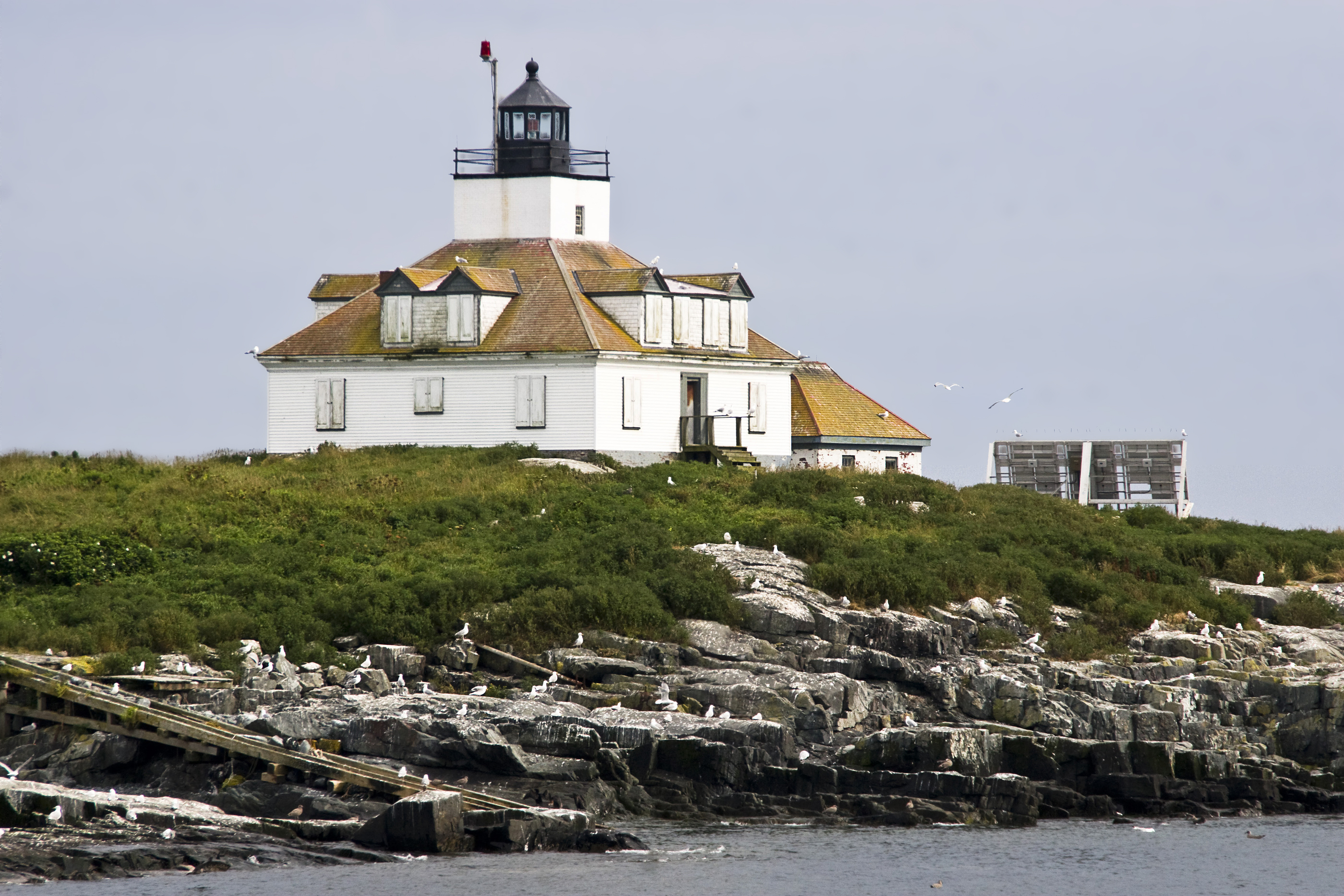
- Egg Rock Light

- Flag Seal Logo

- Location within the U.S. state of Maine
- Coordinates: 44°30′46″N 68°24′57″W
- Country: United States
- State: Maine
- Founded: June 25, 1789
- Named for: John Hancock
- Seat: Ellsworth
- Largest city: Ellsworth

Area
  - Total: 2,345 sq mi (6,070 km^{2})
  - Land: 1,587 sq mi (4,110 km^{2})
  - Water: 758 sq mi (1,960 km^{2}) 32%

Population (2020)
  - Total: 55,478
  - Estimate (2025): 57,171 ▲
  - Density: 34.96/sq mi (13.50/km^{2})
- Time zone: UTC−5 (Eastern)
  - Summer (DST): UTC−4 (EDT)
- Congressional district: 2nd
- Website: hancockcountymaine.gov

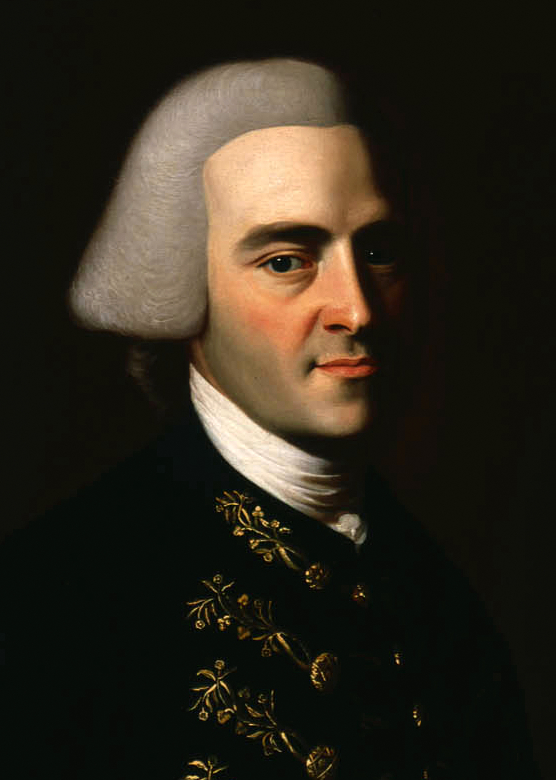
John Hancock of Massachusetts, the namesake of Hancock County

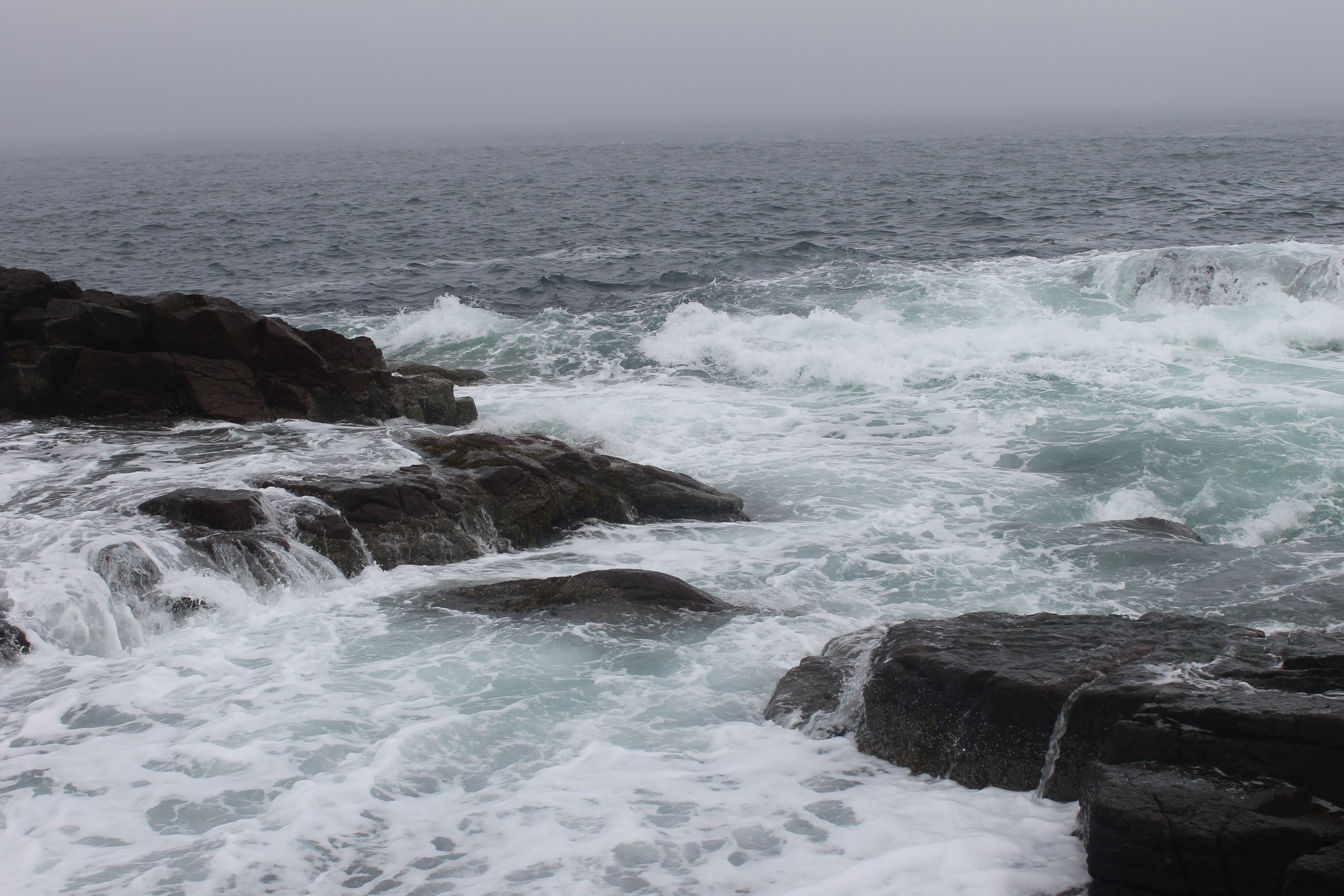
High tide near Thunder Hole in Acadia National Park; Hancock County, Maine, is a major tourist destination in the United States.

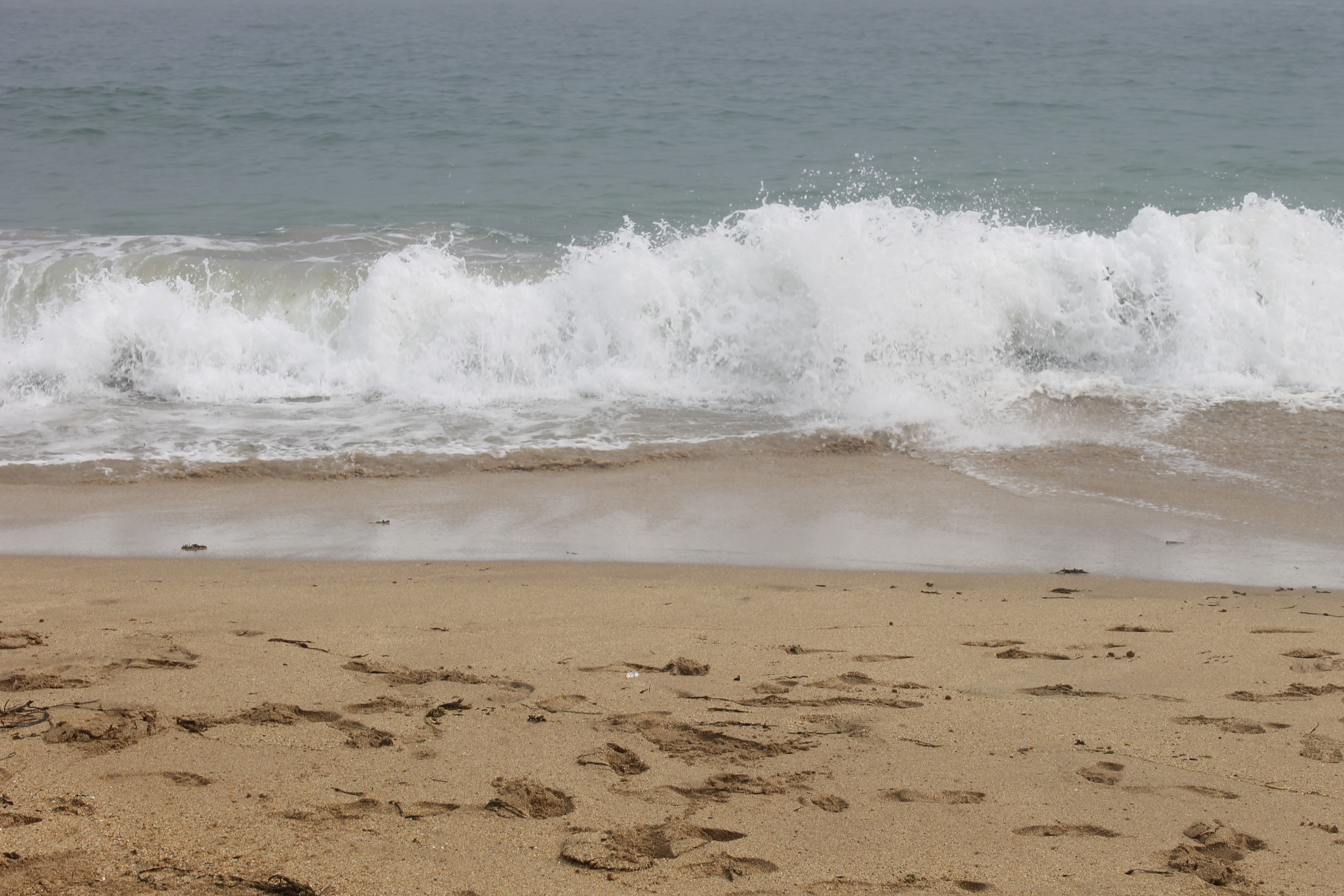
Ocean waves at Sand Beach in Acadia National Park

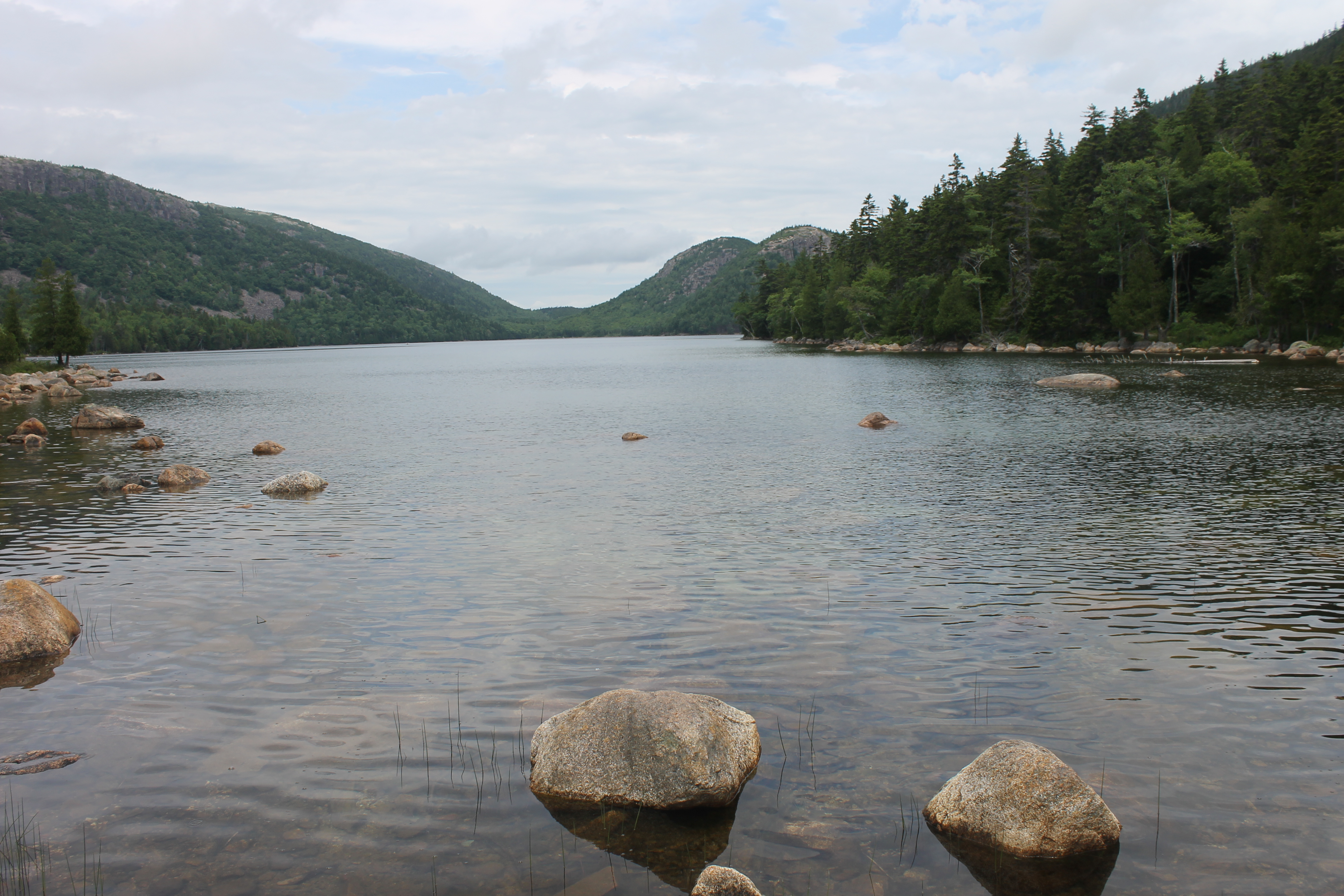
Jordan Pond (July 4, 2014)

Hancock County is a county located in the U.S. state of Maine. As of the 2020 census, the population was 55,478. Its county seat and largest city is Ellsworth. The county was incorporated on June 25, 1789, and named for John Hancock, the first governor of the Commonwealth of Massachusetts.

== Geography ==
According to the U.S. Census Bureau, the county has a total area of 2,345 square miles (6,070 km^{2}), of which 1,587 square miles (4,110 km^{2}) is land and 758 square miles (1,960 km^{2}) (32%) is water. The county high point is Cadillac Mountain, 1527 feet, the highest summit on the U.S. Atlantic seaboard.

The county is home to Acadia National Park, the only national park in New England, which is centered on Mount Desert Island, Maine's largest island and surrounded by several large bays. The county also lies on the eastern side of both Penobscot Bay and the mouth of the Penobscot River, which can be crossed via the Penobscot Narrows Bridge. The county extends inland from the coast, making it one of Maine's eight coastal counties.

=== Adjacent counties ===
- Penobscot County — north
- Washington County — northeast
- Waldo County — west
- Knox County — southwest

=== Major highways ===
- US 1
- US 1A
- SR 3
- SR 9
- SR 15
- SR 102
- SR 172
- SR 175
- SR 176
- SR 179
- SR 180
- SR 181
- SR 184
- SR 200

== Demographics ==
Historical population
Census	Pop.	Note	%±
1790	9,542		—
1800	16,358		71.4%
1810	30,031		83.6%
1820	31,290		4.2%
1830	24,336		−22.2%
1840	28,605		17.5%
1850	34,372		20.2%
1860	37,757		9.8%
1870	36,495		−3.3%
1880	38,129		4.5%
1890	37,312		−2.1%
1900	37,241		−0.2%
1910	35,575		−4.5%
1920	30,361		−14.7%
1930	30,721		1.2%
1940	32,422		5.5%
1950	32,105		−1.0%
1960	32,293		0.6%
1970	34,590		7.1%
1980	41,781		20.8%
1990	46,948		12.4%
2000	51,791		10.3%
2010	54,418		5.1%
2020	55,478		1.9%
2025 (est.)	57,171	▲	3.1%
U.S. Decennial Census; 1790–1960 1900–1990; 1990–2000 2010–2016 2018

=== 2020 census ===
As of the 2020 census, the county had a population of 55,478. Of the residents, 16.8% were under the age of 18 and 26.4% were 65 years of age or older; the median age was 49.5 years. For every 100 females there were 95.0 males, and for every 100 females age 18 and over there were 93.8 males. 0.0% of residents lived in urban areas and 100.0% lived in rural areas.

The racial makeup of the county was 92.7% White, 0.6% Black or African American, 0.5% American Indian and Alaska Native, 1.0% Asian, 0.0% Native Hawaiian and Pacific Islander, 0.7% from some other race, and 4.4% from two or more races. Hispanic or Latino residents of any race comprised 1.7% of the population.

There were 24,948 households in the county, of which 21.4% had children under the age of 18 living with them and 25.5% had a female householder with no spouse or partner present. About 31.9% of all households were made up of individuals and 16.0% had someone living alone who was 65 years of age or older.

There were 40,133 housing units, of which 37.8% were vacant. Among occupied housing units, 74.9% were owner-occupied and 25.1% were renter-occupied. The homeowner vacancy rate was 1.9% and the rental vacancy rate was 9.8%.

Hancock County, Maine – Racial and ethnic composition Note: the US Census treats Hispanic/Latino as an ethnic category. This table excludes Latinos from the racial categories and assigns them to a separate category. Hispanics/Latinos may be of any race.
Race / Ethnicity (NH = Non-Hispanic)	Pop 2000	Pop 2010	Pop 2020	% 2000	% 2010	% 2020
White alone (NH)	50,316	52,353	51,098	97.15%	96.20%	92.10%
Black or African American alone (NH)	123	206	351	0.23%	0.37%	0.63%
Native American or Alaska Native alone (NH)	187	199	231	0.36%	0.36%	0.41%
Asian alone (NH)	196	445	560	0.37%	0.81%	1.00%
Pacific Islander alone (NH)	15	6	10	0.02%	0.01%	0.01%
Other race alone (NH)	40	46	219	0.07%	0.08%	0.39%
Mixed race or Multiracial (NH)	578	569	2,040	1.11%	1.04%	3.67%
Hispanic or Latino (any race)	336	594	969	0.64%	1.09%	1.74%
Total	51,791	54,418	55,478	100.00%	100.00%	100.00%

=== 2010 census ===
As of the 2010 United States census, there were 54,418 people, 24,221 households, and 14,834 families living in the county. The population density was 34.3 inhabitants per square mile (13.2/km^{2}). There were 40,184 housing units at an average density of 25.3 per square mile (9.8/km^{2}). The racial makeup of the county was 96.9% white, 0.8% Asian, 0.4% American Indian, 0.4% black or African American, 0.3% from other races, and 1.2% from two or more races. Those of Hispanic or Latino origin made up 1.1% of the population. In terms of ancestry, 24.0% were English, 19.8% were American, 15.2% were Irish, 9.0% were German, and 7.2% were Scottish.

Of the 24,221 households, 24.4% had children under the age of 18 living with them, 48.9% were married couples living together, 8.2% had a female householder with no husband present, 38.8% were non-families, and 30.3% of all households were made up of individuals. The average household size was 2.20 and the average family size was 2.71. The median age was 46.3 years.

The median income for a household in the county was $47,533 and the median income for a family was $60,092. Males had a median income of $41,046 versus $32,444 for females. The per capita income for the county was $26,876. About 6.8% of families and 11.5% of the population were below the poverty line, including 17.2% of those under age 18 and 7.3% of those age 65 or over.

=== 2000 census ===
As of the census of 2000, there were 51,791 people, 21,864 households, and 14,233 families living in the county. The population density was 33 people per square mile (13 people/km^{2}). There were 33,945 housing units at an average density of 21 per square mile (8.1/km^{2}). The racial makeup of the county was 97.61% White, 0.25% Black or African American, 0.37% Native American, 0.38% Asian, 0.03% Pacific Islander, 0.20% from other races, and 1.15% from two or more races. 0.65% of the population were Hispanic or Latino of any race.

The largest ancestry groups in Hancock County, Maine according to the 2000 census are:

- 24.6% English
- 16.6% American
- 11.9% Irish
- 6.6% French
- 6.1% German

96.8% spoke English, 1.5% French and 1.0% Spanish as their first language.

There were 21,864 households, out of which 28.20% had children under the age of 18 living with them, 53.50% were married couples living together, 8.10% had a female householder with no husband present, and 34.90% were non-families. 27.90% of all households were made up of individuals, and 11.60% had someone living alone who was 65 years of age or older. The average household size was 2.31 and the average family size was 2.81.

In the county, the population was spread out, with 22.30% under the age of 18, 7.40% from 18 to 24, 27.50% from 25 to 44, 26.80% from 45 to 64, and 16.00% who were 65 years of age or older. The median age was 41 years. For every 100 females there were 95.70 males. For every 100 females age 18 and over, there were 92.10 males.

The median income for a household in the county was $35,811, and the median income for a family was $43,216. Males had a median income of $30,461 versus $22,647 for females. The per capita income for the county was $19,809. About 7.00% of families and 10.20% of the population were below the poverty line, including 11.90% of those under age 18 and 9.50% of those age 65 or over.

== Economy ==
Of employed persons 16 years and over in 1990, 1,108 indicated involvement in the "agriculture, forestry and fisheries" industry, though 1,206 indicated "farming, forestry and fishing occupations." The U.S. Census data are not dependable for determining the numbers of individuals involved in the fishing industry. Only firms with 10 or more employees must report their numbers, as well as firms paying workmen's compensation insurance. Because the majority of fishermen in Maine are considered self-employed, the statistics underreport fishing employment.

Cranberry Isles, Deer Isle, Frenchboro, Gouldsboro, Southwest Harbor, Stonington, Swans Island and Tremont (Bass Harbor) were identified by a key respondent as fisheries dependent. Bar Harbor, Brooklin, Brooksville, Hancock, Lamoine, Mount Desert, Penobscot, Sedgwick, Sorrento and Sullivan were also noted as having either significant fishing activity or a significant number of people who fish. Winter Harbor's fishing activities were once dwarfed by the economic activity associated with a naval base, but now that the naval base has closed, fishing activity will most likely be the dominant economic activity in the community. Salmon farming is also popular in the area and Maine Salmon is an important export.

Hancock County has the longest coastline of any Maine county. Commercial fishing and tourism are the county's most important industries. Hancock County is home to Acadia National Park (the only national park in Maine or the New England region, excluding the national sea shore on Cape Cod) and Cadillac Mountain (the highest point in Maine's coastal region). Jackson Laboratory, noted for cancer research, is located in Bar Harbor. Two institutions of higher education are located in Hancock County: Maine Maritime Academy at Castine and the College of the Atlantic at Bar Harbor.

== Air pollution ==
The American Lung Association issues annual State of the Air reports. Their current score card gives Hancock county an "F" for ozone pollution, the only Maine county to receive an F score.

== Government and politics ==
The county's Commissioners are William F. Clark, John Wombacher and Samuel DiBella.

From 1856 to 1988, Hancock County was a Republican stronghold, with Democrats only carrying the county in three of the 34 presidential elections, with those three occasions being in 1912 when the Republican vote was split between William Howard Taft and Theodore Roosevelt; in 1916 when Democratic president Woodrow Wilson won re-election on keeping the US out of World War I, only to then break that promise in his second term; and in 1964 when the Republican candidate was conservative Barry Goldwater, who was defeated by Democratic president Lyndon B. Johnson. Hancock County was the most Republican county in Maine at every presidential election from 1956 to 1980, but started drifting away from the Republicans in the 1980s as the Republican Party nationally got more and more conservative and dominated by evangelical Christians. Since 1992, Democrats have carried Hancock County in every presidential election, although George W. Bush came within one percent of taking the county in 2000.

=== Voter registration ===
Voter registration and party enrollment as of March 2024
Democratic	15,384	36.83%
Republican	12,806	30.66%
Unenrolled	11,405	27.3%
Green Independent	1,611	3.86%
No Labels	454	1.09%
Libertarian	109	0.26%
Total	41,769	100%

United States presidential election results for Hancock County, Maine
Year	Republican / Whig		Democratic		Third party(ies)	
Year	No.	%	No.	%	No.	%
1836	634	36.67%	1,095	63.33%	0	0.00%
1840	2,434	49.24%	2,509	50.76%	0	0.00%
1844	1,849	40.53%	2,608	57.17%	105	2.30%
1848	2,075	44.72%	2,318	49.96%	247	5.32%
1852	1,809	38.97%	2,619	56.42%	214	4.61%
1856	3,667	61.42%	2,142	35.88%	161	2.70%
1860	3,322	60.35%	932	16.93%	1,251	22.72%
1864	3,143	59.45%	2,144	40.55%	0	0.00%
1868	3,520	59.13%	2,433	40.87%	0	0.00%
1872	2,971	65.88%	1,539	34.12%	0	0.00%
1876	3,376	55.72%	2,683	44.28%	0	0.00%
1880	4,314	52.94%	3,698	45.38%	137	1.68%
1884	4,043	55.76%	3,014	41.57%	194	2.68%
1888	4,160	58.94%	2,772	39.27%	126	1.79%
1892	3,300	53.42%	2,654	42.97%	223	3.61%
1896	4,306	68.69%	1,793	28.60%	170	2.71%
1900	3,432	63.70%	1,860	34.52%	96	1.78%
1904	3,430	67.15%	1,558	30.50%	120	2.35%
1908	3,169	61.50%	1,846	35.82%	138	2.68%
1912	1,399	22.70%	2,655	43.09%	2,108	34.21%
1916	3,192	48.14%	3,303	49.81%	136	2.05%
1920	5,604	71.68%	2,154	27.55%	60	0.77%
1924	5,474	77.37%	1,392	19.67%	209	2.95%
1928	8,140	81.84%	1,773	17.83%	33	0.33%
1932	7,942	64.07%	4,369	35.25%	85	0.69%
1936	9,151	72.06%	3,315	26.10%	234	1.84%
1940	8,539	66.36%	4,315	33.54%	13	0.10%
1944	7,143	68.71%	3,241	31.18%	12	0.12%
1948	6,863	77.72%	1,878	21.27%	89	1.01%
1952	10,596	83.21%	2,111	16.58%	27	0.21%
1956	11,316	86.91%	1,704	13.09%	0	0.00%
1960	12,119	78.27%	3,363	21.72%	1	0.01%
1964	6,304	45.89%	7,415	53.98%	18	0.13%
1968	8,929	62.95%	4,979	35.10%	277	1.95%
1972	11,889	73.90%	4,191	26.05%	7	0.04%
1976	12,064	61.40%	6,725	34.23%	858	4.37%
1980	11,435	53.60%	7,027	32.94%	2,872	13.46%
1984	14,660	65.12%	7,764	34.49%	87	0.39%
1988	12,957	56.07%	9,929	42.97%	221	0.96%
1992	8,657	30.05%	10,126	35.15%	10,022	34.79%
1996	8,345	31.55%	12,256	46.34%	5,847	22.11%
2000	12,732	44.56%	12,983	45.44%	2,859	10.01%
2004	14,405	43.49%	18,048	54.49%	669	2.02%
2008	12,686	39.44%	18,895	58.74%	584	1.82%
2012	12,324	40.01%	17,569	57.04%	906	2.94%
2016	13,705	42.65%	16,117	50.16%	2,308	7.18%
2020	14,982	42.41%	19,369	54.83%	974	2.76%
2024	15,551	42.90%	19,817	54.66%	885	2.44%

== Communities ==
=== City ===
- Ellsworth (county seat)

=== Towns ===
- Amherst
- Aurora
- Bar Harbor
- Blue Hill
- Brooklin
- Brooksville
- Bucksport
- Castine
- Cranberry Isles
- Dedham
- Deer Isle
- Eastbrook
- Franklin
- Frenchboro
- Gouldsboro
- Great Pond
- Hancock
- Lamoine
- Mariaville
- Mount Desert
- Orland
- Osborn
- Otis
- Penobscot
- Sedgwick
- Sorrento
- Southwest Harbor
- Stonington
- Sullivan
- Surry
- Swan's Island
- Tremont
- Trenton
- Verona Island
- Waltham
- Winter Harbor

=== Unorganized territories ===
- Central Hancock
- East Hancock
- Marshall Island
- Northwest Hancock

=== Census-designated places ===
- Bar Harbor
- Blue Hill
- Bucksport
- Castine
- Northeast Harbor
- Southwest Harbor
- Winter Harbor

=== Other unincorporated villages ===
- Bass Harbor
- Bernard
- Corea
- East Blue Hill
- East Orland
- Harborside
- Hulls Cove
- Islesford
- Manset
- Minturn
- Prospect Harbor
- Salisbury Cove
- Sargentville
- Seal Cove
- Seal Harbor
- Somesville
- Enoch's Landing
- Sunset
- Town Hill

=== Fictional towns ===
- Collinsport (from Dark Shadows)
- Silent Hill, loosely based on Ellsworth and Bar Harbor (from the Silent Hill video game series).

== Education ==
School districts include:

K-12:

- Airline Community School District
- Blue Hill School District
- Brooklin School District
- Brooksville School District
- Castine School District
- Cranberry Isles School District
- Dedham School District
- Deer Isle-Stonington Community School District
- Ellsworth Public Schools
- Hancock Public Schools
- Frenchboro School District
- Lamoine Public Schools
- Otis School District
- Penobscot School District
- Sedgwick School District
- Surry School District
- Trenton School District
- Regional School Unit 24
- Regional School Unit 25
- School Administrative District 76

Secondary:

- Mount Desert Community School District

Elementary:

- Bar Harbor School District
- Mount Desert School District
- Southwest Harbor School District
- Tremont School District

There is also the Hancock Unorganized Territory, which is not in any municipality. The Maine Department of Education takes responsibility for coordinating school assignments in the unorganized territory.

== See also ==
- Aquaculture in Maine
- Nicatous Lake, the second largest lake in Hancock County
- National Register of Historic Places listings in Hancock County, Maine
