= 1984 United States presidential election in Maine =

- November 6, 1984

Nominee	Ronald Reagan	Walter Mondale
Party	Republican	Democratic
Home state	California	Minnesota
Running mate	George H. W. Bush	Geraldine Ferraro
Electoral vote	4	0
Popular vote	336,500	214,515
Percentage	60.83%	38.78%

Reagan
40–50%
50–60%
60–70%
70–80%
80–90%
90–100%
Mondale
50–60%
60–70%
70–80%
80–90%
Tie
President before election
Ronald Reagan
Republican
Elected President
Ronald Reagan
Republican

The 1984 United States presidential election in Maine took place on November 6, 1984. All fifty states and the District of Columbia, were part of the 1984 United States presidential election. Voters chose four electors to the Electoral College, which selected the president and vice president of the United States. Maine was won by incumbent United States President Ronald Reagan of California, who was running against former Vice President Walter Mondale of Minnesota. Reagan ran for a second time with former C.I.A. Director George H. W. Bush of Texas, and Mondale ran with Representative Geraldine Ferraro of New York, the first major female candidate for the vice presidency.

The presidential election of 1984 was a very partisan election for Maine, with more than 99% of the electorate voting either Democratic or Republican, and only four parties appearing on the ballot. Every county in Maine voted for Reagan by a double-digit margin, a strong performance in a historically Republican-leaning state that had trended Democratic since the 1960s. Reagan became the first Republican to win industrialized, Catholic French-Canadian Androscoggin County since Dwight D. Eisenhower in 1956.

Even amidst a national Republican landslide, Maine weighed in as almost 4% more Republican than the national average. This election marked something of a high water mark for Republicans in Maine; no candidate of either party has since come close to Reagan's vote share or margin, and the state at-large has subsequently only voted Republican once more (in the following election of 1988).

== Results ==
1984 United States presidential election in Maine
Party	Candidate	Votes	Percentage	Electoral votes
Republican	Ronald Reagan (incumbent)	336,500	60.83%	4
Democratic	Walter Mondale	214,515	38.78%	0
Communist Party	Gus Hall	1,292	0.23%	0
New Alliance Party	Dennis Serrette	755	0.14%	0
Write-Ins		82	0.01%	0
Totals		553,144	100.0%	4

=== Results by congressional district ===
Reagan won both of Maine's congressional districts.

District	Reagan	Mondale	Representative
1st	59.69%	39.95%	John R. McKernan Jr.
2nd	62.16%	37.47%	Olympia Snowe

=== Results by county ===
County	Ronald Reagan Republican		Walter Mondale Democratic		Gus Hall Communist		Various candidates Other parties		Margin		Total votes cast
County	#	%	#	%	#	%	#	%	#	%	Total votes cast
Androscoggin	26,904	57.24%	19,885	42.31%	101	0.21%	110	0.23%	7,019	14.93%	47,000
Aroostook	21,837	63.59%	12,348	35.96%	95	0.28%	58	0.17%	9,489	27.63%	34,338
Cumberland	65,842	56.75%	49,894	43.00%	190	0.16%	100	0.09%	15,948	13.75%	116,026
Franklin	8,330	62.40%	4,954	37.11%	40	0.30%	25	0.19%	3,376	25.29%	13,349
Hancock	14,660	65.12%	7,764	34.49%	53	0.24%	34	0.15%	6,896	30.63%	22,511
Kennebec	31,753	59.70%	21,183	39.82%	173	0.33%	82	0.15%	10,570	19.88%	53,191
Knox	11,311	65.00%	6,024	34.62%	47	0.27%	19	0.11%	5,287	30.38%	17,401
Lincoln	10,312	67.68%	4,869	31.96%	29	0.19%	26	0.17%	5,443	35.72%	15,236
Oxford	15,408	64.34%	8,430	35.20%	67	0.28%	43	0.18%	6,978	29.14%	23,948
Penobscot	40,403	62.11%	24,445	37.58%	112	0.17%	94	0.14%	15,958	24.53%	65,054
Piscataquis	5,427	63.98%	3,016	35.56%	24	0.28%	15	0.18%	2,411	28.42%	8,482
Sagadahoc	9,222	63.51%	5,208	35.87%	64	0.44%	26	0.18%	4,014	27.64%	14,520
Somerset	13,010	62.64%	7,657	36.86%	66	0.32%	38	0.18%	5,353	25.78%	20,771
Waldo	8,814	62.22%	5,289	37.34%	40	0.28%	23	0.16%	3,525	24.88%	14,166
Washington	9,713	64.41%	5,308	35.20%	31	0.21%	29	0.19%	4,405	29.21%	15,081
York	43,554	60.43%	28,241	39.19%	160	0.22%	115	0.16%	15,313	21.24%	72,070
Totals	336,500	60.83%	214,515	38.78%	1,292	0.23%	837	0.15%	121,985	22.05%	553,144

==== Counties that flipped from Democratic to Republican ====
- Androscoggin
- Cumberland

== See also ==
- United States presidential elections in Maine
- Presidency of Ronald Reagan
