= 1972 United States presidential election in Maine =

- November 7, 1972

Nominee	Richard Nixon	George McGovern
Party	Republican	Democratic
Home state	California	South Dakota
Running mate	Spiro Agnew	Sargent Shriver
Electoral vote	4	0
Popular vote	256,458	160,584
Percentage	61.46%	38.48%

Nixon
50–60%
60–70%
70–80%
80–90%
90–100%
McGovern
50–60%
60–70%
70–80%
80–90%
Tie
50%
President before election
Richard Nixon
Republican
Elected President
Richard Nixon
Republican

The 1972 United States presidential election in Maine took place on November 7, 1972, as part of the 1972 United States presidential election which was held throughout all fifty states and the District of Columbia. Voters chose four representatives, or electors to the Electoral College, who voted for president and vice president.

This was the first presidential election in which Maine allocated its electoral votes using the congressional district method, giving 2 electoral votes to the overall winner of the state and 1 electoral vote to the winner of each congressional district.

Maine was won by the incumbent Republican president Richard Nixon by a landslide 23 point margin over his Democratic challenger, Senator George McGovern of South Dakota. Nixon took 61.46% of the vote, totaling up to 256,458 votes, to McGovern’s 38.48%, and 160,584 votes. In the midst of Nixon’s massive 49-state landslide victory, Maine voted almost exactly as the country did, only voting about 0.7% more Republican than the nation as a whole.

Richard Nixon swept every county in the state except for Androscoggin, where McGovern won by a mere 103 votes. Androscoggin was the solitary county McGovern won in the Northeast outside of Massachusetts or in the city limits of Baltimore, New York, Philadelphia, and Washington.

Nixon's victory was the first of five consecutive Republican victories in the state, as Maine would not vote for a Democratic candidate again until Bill Clinton in 1992; it has since become a Democratic-leaning state.

Since 1972 no presidential candidate of either party has surpassed Nixon’s 61.46% of the vote in Maine (the closest being Ronald Reagan’s 60.83% in 1984).

== Results ==
1972 United States presidential election in Maine
Party	Candidate	Votes	Percentage	Electoral votes
Republican	Richard Nixon (incumbent)	256,458	61.46%	4
Democratic	George McGovern	160,584	38.48%	0
American Independent	John G. Schmitz (write-in)	117	0.03%	0
Peace and Freedom	Benjamin Spock (write-in)	3	0.00%	0
Socialist Workers	Linda Jenness (write-in)	2	0.00%	0
Communist	Gus Hall (write-in)	2	0.00%	0
Libertarian	John Hospers (write-in)	1	0.00%	0
Write-ins	Scattered (Other write-ins)	104	0.02%	0
Totals		417,271	100.00%	4
Voter turnout				60%/68%

=== By congressional district ===
Nixon won both congressional districts, including one held by a Democrat.

District	Nixon	McGovern	Representative
1st	61.42%	38.58%	Peter Kyros
2nd	61.58%	38.42%	William Hathaway (92nd Congress)
2nd	61.58%	38.42%	William Cohen (93rd Congress)

=== Results by county ===
County	Richard Nixon Republican		George McGovern Democratic		Various candidates Write-ins		Margin		Total votes cast
County	#	%	#	%	#	%	#	%	Total votes cast
Androscoggin	19,406	49.86%	19,509	50.12%	9	0.02%	-103	-0.26%	38,924
Aroostook	19,051	62.37%	11,474	37.56%	22	0.07%	7,577	24.81%	30,547
Cumberland	51,268	60.59%	33,326	39.38%	23	0.03%	17,942	21.21%	84,617
Franklin	5,958	66.50%	2,988	33.35%	14	0.16%	2,970	33.15%	8,960
Hancock	11,889	73.90%	4,191	26.05%	7	0.04%	7,698	47.85%	16,087
Kennebec	24,617	59.99%	16,379	39.91%	39	0.10%	8,238	20.08%	41,035
Knox	8,478	70.19%	3,601	29.81%			4,877	40.38%	12,079
Lincoln	7,580	72.28%	2,903	27.68%	4	0.04%	4,677	44.60%	10,487
Oxford	12,114	64.36%	6,661	35.39%	48	0.26%	5,453	28.97%	18,823
Penobscot	30,186	61.92%	18,552	38.06%	11	0.02%	11,634	23.86%	48,749
Piscataquis	4,617	64.70%	2,518	35.29%	1	0.01%	2,099	29.41%	7,136
Sagadahoc	6,463	65.35%	3,414	34.52%	13	0.13%	3,049	30.83%	9,890
Somerset	10,079	62.97%	5,921	36.99%	5	0.03%	4,158	25.98%	16,005
Waldo	6,480	68.78%	2,941	31.21%	1	0.01%	3,539	37.57%	9,422
Washington	7,820	67.57%	3,742	32.33%	12	0.10%	4,078	35.24%	11,574
York	30,452	57.53%	22,464	42.44%	20	0.04%	7,988	15.09%	52,936
Totals	256,458	61.46%	160,584	38.48%	229	0.05%	95,874	22.98%	417,271

== See also ==
- United States presidential elections in Maine
