= 1956 United States presidential election in Maine =

- November 6, 1956

Nominee	Dwight D. Eisenhower	Adlai Stevenson
Party	Republican	Democratic
Home state	Pennsylvania (Note: Although he was born in Texas and grew up in Kansas before his military career, at the time of the 1952 election Eisenhower was president of Columbia University and was, officially, a resident of New York. During his first term as president, he moved his private residence to Gettysburg, Pennsylvania, and officially changed his residency to Pennsylvania.)	Illinois
Running mate	Richard Nixon	Estes Kefauver
Electoral vote	5	0
Popular vote	249,238	102,468
Percentage	70.87%	29.13%

Eisenhower
50–60%
60–70%
70–80%
80–90%
90–100%
Stevenson
50–60%
60–70%
70–80%
80–90%
Tie
50%
President before election
Dwight D. Eisenhower
Republican
Elected President
Dwight D. Eisenhower
Republican

The 1956 United States presidential election in Maine took place on November 6, 1956, as part of the 1956 United States presidential election which was held throughout all contemporary 48 states. Voters chose five representatives, or electors to the Electoral College, who voted for president and vice president.

Maine overwhelmingly voted for the Republican nominee, incumbent President Dwight D. Eisenhower of Pennsylvania, over the Democratic nominee, former Governor Adlai Stevenson of Illinois. Eisenhower ran with incumbent Vice President Richard Nixon of California, while Stevenson's running mate was Senator Estes Kefauver of Tennessee.

Eisenhower won Maine by a landslide margin of 41.74%. Although Maine was almost completely dominated by the Republican Party between 1856 and 1960 (apart from 1912 where the Republican vote was split), Eisenhower's performance is nonetheless the second-best by any presidential candidate in Maine, behind only Yankee Calvin Coolidge in 1924, who won a 1.16% higher share of the popular vote. He carried every county in Maine, and won thirteen of sixteen with over seventy percent of the vote. This election would prove the last of a century of GOP dominance in the Yankee Northeast: over the following two elections, the Republican share would decline 39% in Maine as the party moved its target support base from the declining Northeast to the "Sun Belt" of the lower-tax South and Desert Southwest.

With 70.87% of the popular vote, Maine would prove to be Eisenhower's second strongest state after nearby Vermont. Eisenhower's winning margin of over 146,000 votes is the largest in history for a presidential candidate in Maine.

== Results ==
1956 United States presidential election in Maine
Party	Candidate	Running mate	Popular vote		Electoral vote	
Party	Candidate	Running mate	Count	%	Count	%
Republican	Dwight David Eisenhower of Pennsylvania (incumbent)	Richard Nixon of California (incumbent)	249,238	70.87%	5	100.00%
Democratic	Adlai Stevenson II of Illinois	Estes Kefauver of Tennessee	102,468	29.13%	0	0.00%
Total			351,706	100.00%	5	100.00%

=== Results by county ===
County	Dwight D. Eisenhower Republican		Adlai Stevenson Democratic		Margin		Total votes cast
County	#	%	#	%	#	%	Total votes cast
Androscoggin	20,385	56.27%	15,842	43.73%	4,543	12.54%	36,227
Aroostook	16,001	72.44%	6,089	27.56%	9,912	44.88%	22,090
Cumberland	49,696	71.88%	19,438	28.12%	30,258	43.76%	69,134
Franklin	6,307	78.97%	1,680	21.03%	4,627	57.94%	7,987
Hancock	11,316	86.91%	1,704	13.09%	9,612	73.82%	13,020
Kennebec	23,028	66.73%	11,483	33.27%	11,545	33.46%	34,511
Knox	8,866	81.32%	2,037	18.68%	6,829	62.64%	10,903
Lincoln	7,191	86.07%	1,164	13.93%	6,027	72.14%	8,355
Oxford	12,607	73.04%	4,653	26.96%	7,954	46.08%	17,260
Penobscot	27,806	76.44%	8,568	23.56%	19,238	52.88%	36,374
Piscataquis	5,336	77.59%	1,541	22.41%	3,795	55.18%	6,877
Sagadahoc	6,201	72.94%	2,301	27.06%	3,900	45.88%	8,502
Somerset	10,471	71.77%	4,119	28.23%	6,352	43.54%	14,590
Waldo	6,590	82.64%	1,384	17.36%	5,206	65.28%	7,974
Washington	8,181	76.20%	2,555	23.80%	5,626	52.40%	10,736
York	29,256	62.03%	17,910	37.97%	11,346	24.06%	47,166
Totals	249,238	70.87%	102,468	29.13%	146,770	41.74%	351,706

== See also ==
- United States presidential elections in Maine
