= 1884 United States presidential election in Maine =

- November 4, 1884
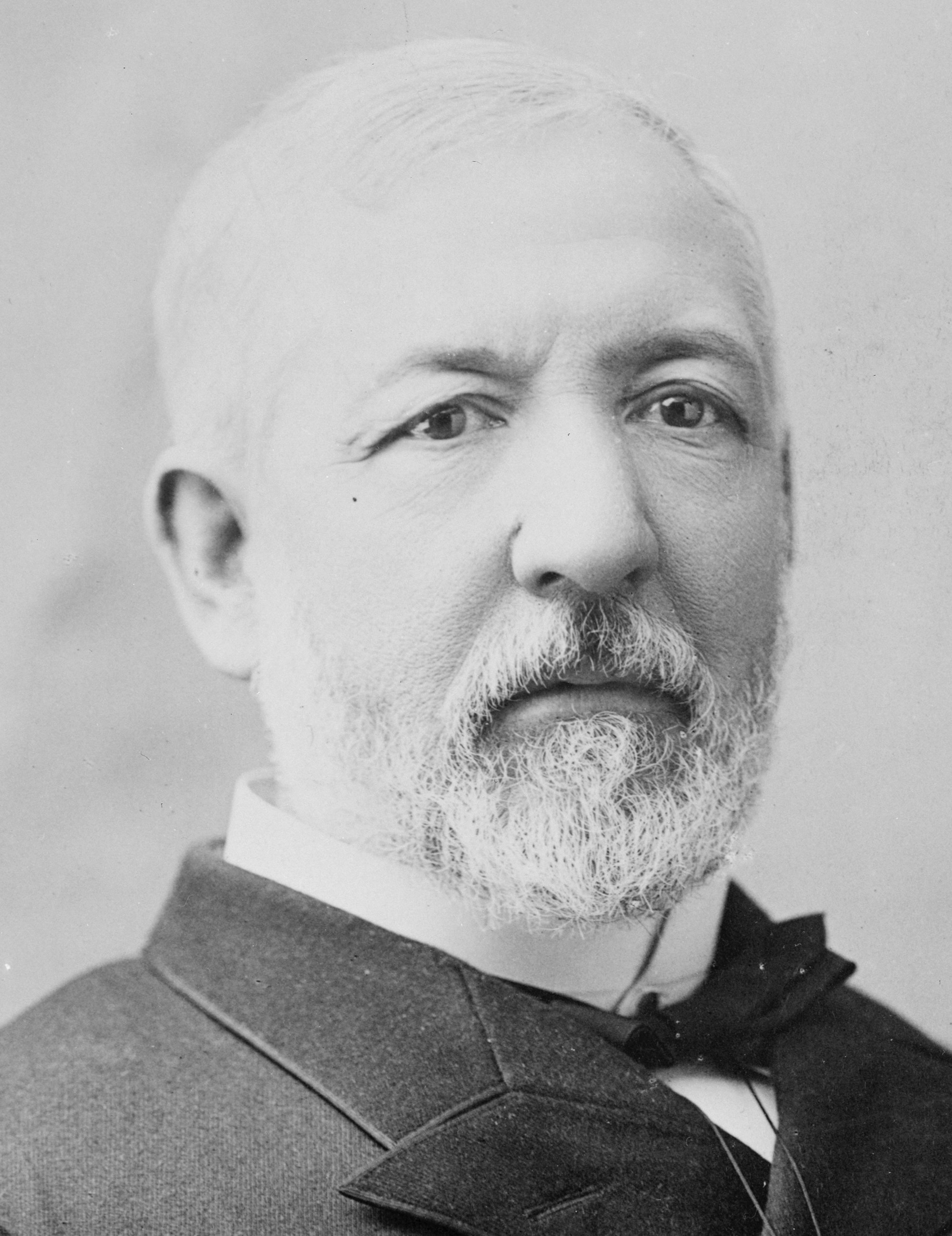

Nominee	James G. Blaine	Grover Cleveland
Party	Republican	Democratic
Home state	Maine	New York
Running mate	John A. Logan	Thomas A. Hendricks
Electoral vote	6	0
Popular vote	72,217	52,153
Percentage	55.34%	39.97%
County results
Blaine
40–50%
50–60%
60–70%
President before election
Chester A. Arthur
Republican
Elected President
Grover Cleveland
Democratic

The 1884 United States presidential election in Maine took place on November 4, 1884, as part of the 1884 United States presidential election. Voters chose six representatives, or electors to the Electoral College, who voted for president and vice president.

Maine voted for the Republican nominee, James G. Blaine, over the Democratic nominee, Grover Cleveland. Blaine won his home state by a margin of 15.37%.

== Results ==
1884 United States presidential election in Maine
Party	Candidate	Running mate	Popular vote		Electoral vote	
Party	Candidate	Running mate	Count	%	Count	%
Republican	James Gillespie Blaine of Maine	John Alexander Logan of Illinois	72,217	55.34%	6	100.00%
Democratic	Grover Cleveland of New York	Thomas Andrews Hendricks of Indiana	52,153	39.97%	0	0.00%
Greenback	Benjamin Franklin Butler of Massachusetts	Absolom Madden West of Mississippi	3,955	3.03%	0	0.00%
Prohibition	John Pierce St. John of Kansas	William Daniel of Maryland	2,160	1.65%	0	0.00%
N/A	Others	Others	6	0.01%	0	0.00%
Total			130,491	100.00%	6	100.00%

=== Results by county ===
County	James Gillespie Blaine Republican		Stephen Grover Cleveland Democratic		Various candidates Other parties		Margin		Total votes cast
County	#	%	#	%	#	%	#	%	Total votes cast
Androscoggin	4,745	52.13%	3,469	38.11%	889	9.77%	1,276	14.02%	9,103
Aroostook	3,028	53.62%	2,192	38.82%	427	7.56%	836	14.80%	5,647
Cumberland	9,510	50.44%	8,170	43.33%	1,175	6.23%	1,340	7.11%	18,855
Franklin	2,387	57.80%	1,375	33.29%	368	8.91%	1,012	24.50%	4,130
Hancock	4,043	54.22%	3,014	40.42%	399	5.35%	1,029	13.80%	7,456
Kennebec	7,572	61.30%	3,906	31.62%	874	7.08%	3,666	29.68%	12,352
Knox	2,819	46.50%	2,364	39.00%	879	14.50%	455	7.51%	6,062
Lincoln	2,488	50.98%	2,078	42.58%	314	6.43%	410	8.40%	4,880
Oxford	4,222	53.72%	2,899	36.89%	738	9.39%	1,323	16.83%	7,859
Penobscot	8,006	56.14%	5,303	37.18%	953	6.68%	2,703	18.95%	14,262
Piscataquis	1,976	58.02%	1,169	34.32%	261	7.66%	807	23.69%	3,406
Sagadahoc	2,730	64.01%	1,278	29.96%	257	6.03%	1,452	34.04%	4,265
Somerset	4,159	53.80%	2,974	38.47%	598	7.74%	1,185	15.33%	7,731
Waldo	3,153	50.08%	2,669	42.39%	474	7.53%	484	7.69%	6,296
Washington	4,244	53.82%	3,341	42.37%	300	3.80%	903	11.45%	7,885
York	7,127	51.01%	5,939	42.51%	906	6.48%	1,188	8.50%	13,972
Totals	72,209 (Note: These totals differ from those in Dave Leip’s Atlas.)	53.82%	52,140	38.86%	9,812	7.31%	20,069	14.96%	134,161

== See also ==
- United States presidential elections in Maine
