= Aquaculture in Maine =

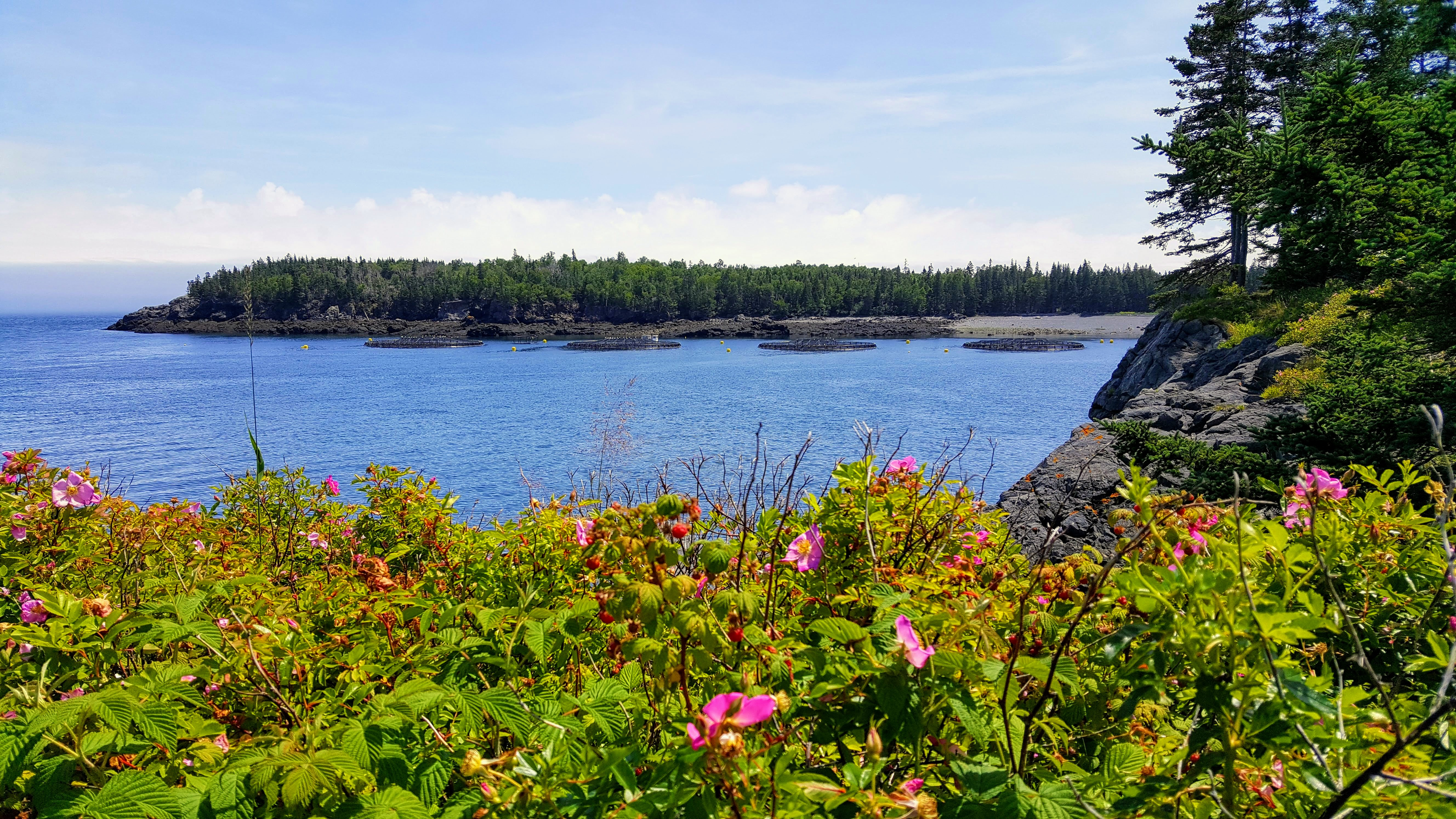
Aquaculture in Maine, 2018

Maine, in the United States, has a tradition of having a large fishing and lobster industry. However today some of that industry has switched to salmon farming or aquaculture. Of late aquaculturists in Maine are most concerned about the outbreak of Infectious salmon anemia virus (ISA) in the Bay of Fundy, New Brunswick. The Canadian and US salmon raising industries in the bay are geographically near one another and are therefore ecologically integrated. Machias Bay, which is 50 miles west of the Bay of Fundy, is also a location of salmon raising in Maine close to the Bay of Fundy.

== History ==
The Maine aquaculture industry has grown dramatically in the past decade. In 1988 the harvest collected approximately 1 million pounds of salmon and trout at 10 sites, while just four years later this had grown to 10 million pounds of harvested salmon alone. This growth in Maine mirrors growth of the industry worldwide. Farmed salmon production worldwide increased from 47,000 tons to 550,000 tons during the years from 1985 to 1995.

In 1995 Maine comprised approximately 1.8% of the total world production of salmon. In 1997 the Maine aquaculture industry produced 22.5 million pounds of salmon from 27 sites for a total of $50 million. In 1998 it was 24 million pounds of salmon worth about $60 million. Salmon producers in Maine indicated to the Maine Department of Marine Resources that they are committed to increasing production up to 50% in the next few years.

== Economics ==
Maine accounts for 18% of the US domestic salmon market. Within the state of Maine, the salmon industry provided close to 1000 jobs in 1996. The vast majority of these jobs are in Washington County. The industry in 1996 accounted for "$30 million of personal income and $44 million of goods and services produced in Maine (gross regional product). In 1998, the Maine salmon industry had an estimated economic value of $60 million. For comparison, the Maine dairy and potato industries each had an estimated economic value of $90 million in 1998." See below, Karlsen.

One company, Atlantic Salmon of Maine LLC produces about 7,000 tons of farmed salmon. Design and consulting firm, Innovio Labs (ILGC) has made forecasts that would suggest significant growth in the industry due to rising global demands.

== See also ==
- Aquaculture of salmon
- Environmental issues with salmon
