= 2004 United States presidential election in Maine =

- November 2, 2004

Nominee	John Kerry	George W. Bush
Party	Democratic	Republican
Home state	Massachusetts	Texas
Running mate	John Edwards	Dick Cheney
Electoral vote	4	0
Popular vote	396,842	330,201
Percentage	53.57%	44.58%

Kerry
40–50%
50–60%
60–70%
70–80%
80–90%
90–100%
Bush
40–50%
50–60%
60–70%
70–80%
80–90%
90–100%
Tie
President before election
George W. Bush
Republican
Elected President
George W. Bush
Republican

The 2004 United States presidential election in Maine took place on November 2, 2004, and was part of the 2004 United States presidential election. Maine is one of two U.S. states, where, instead of all of the state's four electors of the Electoral College voting based on the statewide results of the voters, two electors vote based on their respective congressional district. The other two electors vote based on the statewide results.

Maine was considered by some to be a swing state, because of the closeness of some polls. However, the polls were consistently won by Kerry, and neither campaign prioritized the state. On election day, Democrat John Kerry won the popular vote with 53.57%, over George W. Bush with 44.58%. This is the most recent presidential election in which a losing Democrat won Maine's 2nd congressional district, and remained the last time until 2020 that the district voted for a losing candidate. This is the first time since 1968 in which a Republican won the popular vote without Maine. Bush is the first Republican to win two terms in the White House without carrying Maine at least once.

== Caucuses ==
- 2004 Maine Democratic presidential caucuses

== Campaign ==
There were 12 news organizations who made state-by-state predictions of the election. Here are their last predictions before election day.

Source	Ranking
D.C. Political Report	Lean D
Associated Press	Lean D
CNN	Likely D
Cook Political Report	Lean D
Newsweek	Lean D
New York Times	Lean D
Rasmussen Reports	Likely D
Research 2000	Solid D
Washington Post	Toss-up
Washington Times	Lean D
Zogby International	Likely D
Washington Dispatch	Likely D

=== Polling ===
Out of 15 pre-election polls, Kerry won thirteen. By the end of October, all polls showed Kerry over 50%. The final Real Clear Politics average showed Kerry leading 51% to 41.5% with a margin of 9.5%. In three Survey USA polls taken in October, Kerry's numbers increased each time from 49%, to 51%, to 52%. Tthe final three polls averaged Kerry with 51% to Bush at 45%.

=== Fundraising ===
Bush raised $362,522. Kerry raised $1,057,209.

=== Advertising and visits ===
After March 3, 2004, Kerry did not visit the state once, while Bush visited the state five times. A rough total estimate of $400,000 was spent on advertising each week, excluding the last week.

== Analysis ==
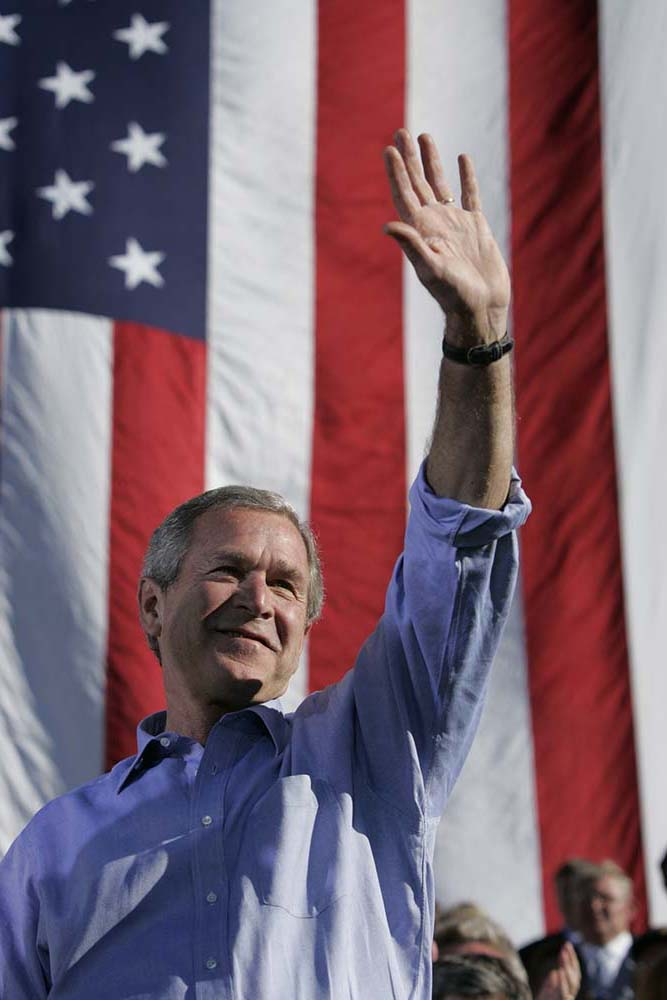
President Bush waves after delivering remarks at a campaign rally in Bangor, Maine.

Once a typical Yankee Republican state, Maine had not been carried by a Republican presidential nominee since George H. W. Bush did so in 1988. While the younger Bush did make a play for the state in 2004, John Kerry ultimately won it by a fairly comfortable 9-point margin, including its two congressional districts. Maine is one of two states, the other being Nebraska, which allocate their electoral votes by congressional district. A candidate is awarded an electoral vote for each district won, even if the candidate loses statewide, while the statewide winner is awarded two additional electoral votes. In 2016, 2020, and 2024, Republican Donald Trump won Maine's 2nd district despite losing the state overall, and thus he received one electoral vote from the state both times. This makes George W. Bush the last Republican, and the last candidate of either party until Joe Biden in 2020, to win a presidential election without carrying Maine's 2nd district.

Bush became the first Republican to win the White House without carrying Lincoln or Waldo counties since James A. Garfield in 1880.

== Results ==
2004 United States presidential election in Maine
Party	Candidate	Votes	Percentage	Electoral votes
Democratic	John Kerry	396,842	53.57%	4
Republican	George W. Bush (incumbent)	330,201	44.58%	0
Independent	Ralph Nader	8,069	1.09%	0
Green	David Cobb	2,936	0.40%	0
Libertarian	Michael Badnarik	1,965	0.26%	0
Constitution	Michael Peroutka	735	0.10%	0
Others		4	0.00%	0
Totals		740,752	100.00%	4
Voter turnout		72.69%		—

=== By county ===
County	John Kerry Democratic		George W. Bush Republican		Various candidates Other parties		Margin		Total votes cast
County	#	%	#	%	#	%	#	%	Total votes cast
Androscoggin	30,503	54.40%	24,519	43.73%	1,045	1.86%	5,984	10.67%	56,067
Aroostook	19,569	51.86%	17,564	46.55%	600	1.59%	2,005	5.31%	37,733
Cumberland	94,846	58.20%	65,384	40.12%	2,732	1.68%	29,462	18.08%	162,962
Franklin	9,465	54.83%	7,378	42.74%	418	2.42%	2,087	12.09%	17,261
Hancock	18,048	54.49%	14,405	43.49%	669	2.02%	3,643	11.00%	33,122
Kennebec	35,616	53.34%	29,761	44.57%	1,395	2.09%	5,855	8.77%	66,772
Knox	12,690	54.59%	10,103	43.46%	454	1.95%	2,587	11.13%	23,247
Lincoln	11,351	51.26%	10,370	46.83%	421	1.90%	981	4.43%	22,142
Oxford	16,618	52.68%	14,196	45.00%	732	2.32%	2,422	7.68%	31,546
Penobscot	40,417	49.22%	40,318	49.10%	1,377	1.68%	99	0.12%	82,112
Piscataquis	4,409	44.36%	5,299	53.31%	232	2.33%	-890	-8.95%	9,940
Sagadahoc	11,107	52.69%	9,497	45.05%	475	2.25%	1,610	7.64%	21,079
Somerset	13,555	50.00%	12,953	47.78%	600	2.21%	602	2.22%	27,108
Waldo	11,555	51.77%	10,309	46.19%	454	2.03%	1,246	5.58%	22,318
Washington	8,391	48.47%	8,619	49.79%	300	1.73%	-228	-1.32%	17,310
York	58,702	53.35%	49,526	45.01%	1,805	1.64%	9,176	8.34%	110,033
Total	396,842	53.57%	330,201	44.58%	13,709	1.85%	66,641	8.99%	740,752

Counties that flipped from Republican to Democratic

- Lincoln (largest town: Waldoboro)
- Penobscot (largest city: Bangor)
- Waldo (largest city: Belfast)

=== By congressional district ===
Kerry won both congressional districts.

District	Bush	Kerry	Representative
1st	43%	55%	Tom Allen
2nd	46%	52%	Mike Michaud

== Electors ==
Technically the voters of Maine cast their ballots for electors: representatives to the Electoral College. Maine is allocated four electors because it has two congressional districts and two senators. All candidates who appear on the ballot or qualify to receive write-in votes must submit a list of four electors, who pledge to vote for their candidate and his or her running mate. Whoever wins the majority of votes in the state is awarded just two of the electoral votes. The other two electoral votes are based upon the congressional district results. Their chosen electors then vote for president and vice president. Although electors are pledged to their candidate and running mate, they are not obligated to vote for them. An elector who votes for someone other than his or her candidate is known as a faithless elector.

The electors of each state and the District of Columbia met on December 13, 2004, to cast their votes for president and vice president. The Electoral College itself never meets as one body. Instead, the electors from each state and the District of Columbia met in their respective capitols.

The following were the members of the Electoral College from the state. Since Kerry won both congressional districts, all four were pledged to Kerry/Edwards.

1. Lu Bauer, elector for the 1st Congressional district
2. David Garrity, elector for the 2nd Congressional district
3. Jill Duson, at-large elector
4. Samuel Shapiro, at-large elector

== See also ==
- United States presidential elections in Maine
