= Nicatous Lake =

- Location within Maine Location within the United States
- Location: Hancock County, Maine, United States
- Coordinates: 45°05′17″N 68°08′49″W
- Type: Reservoir
- Basin countries: United States
- Max. length: over 8 miles (13 km)
- Surface area: 5,165 acres (2,090 ha)
- Max. depth: 56 ft (17 m)
- Surface elevation: 351 ft (107 m)
- Islands: Numerous

Nicatous Lake is a body of water in Hancock County, Maine. Covering 5,165 acres (2,090 ha), it is the second largest lake in Hancock County and one of the largest in the state of Maine. The lake is very long (over 8 miles (13 km) in length) and narrow with many islands scattered throughout. It is also a very shallow lake with low oxygen. The maximum depth is 56 feet (17 m) in the south basin area. The principal fisheries include landlocked salmon, brown trout, smallmouth bass, white perch and chain pickerel.

In 1999, the State of Maine purchased 78 undeveloped islands in Nicatous Lake as part of a conservation program. This purchase was part of a larger plan to conserve approximately 22,000 acres (8,900 ha) of land surrounding the lake.

== See also ==
- List of lakes in Maine
