= 1996 United States presidential election in Maine =

- November 5, 1996

Nominee	Bill Clinton	Bob Dole	Ross Perot
Party	Democratic	Republican	Reform
Home state	Arkansas	Kansas	Texas
Running mate	Al Gore	Jack Kemp	James Campbell (Note: On the California, Indiana, Iowa, Kansas, Louisiana, Maine, Maryland, Missouri, Montana, Oregon, South Dakota, Tennessee, and Texas election ballots, James Campbell of California, Perot's former boss at IBM, was listed as a stand-in vice-presidential candidate until Perot decided on Pat Choate as his choice for Vice President.)
Electoral vote	4	0	0
Popular vote	312,788	186,378	85,970
Percentage	51.62%	30.76%	14.19%

Clinton
30–40%
40–50%
50–60%
60–70%
70–80%
80–90%
Dole
30–40%
40–50%
50–60%
60–70%
Perot
40–50%
60–70%
Tie
President before election
Bill Clinton
Democratic
Elected President
Bill Clinton
Democratic

The 1996 United States presidential election in Maine took place on November 5, 1996, as part of the 1996 United States presidential election. Maine is one of two states in the U.S. that chooses two of its four representatives in the Electoral College based on the plurality vote in both its congressional districts instead of all four electors being chosen based on the statewide plurality vote.

Maine confirmed its status as a blue state, with Democratic nominee President Bill Clinton carrying the state with 51.62% of the vote over Republican Bob Dole, who received 30.76%. As of 2024, Clinton's 20.86% margin of victory is the widest for a Democrat since Lyndon B. Johnson in 1964, although several subsequent Democrats have won a higher vote percentage.

Maine has voted Democratic since 1992, and is the only state other than Nebraska to split its electoral votes. The last time Maine went Republican was for George H. W. Bush and Dan Quayle in 1988. Third Party candidate Ross Perot had a lesser impact this time, only drawing 14% of the vote, compared to 30% in 1992. This would still be where Perot received the highest percentage of votes in 1996. As of the 2024 presidential election, this is the last election in which Piscataquis County voted for a Democratic presidential candidate. This is also the most recent presidential election in which all the counties of Maine voted for the same party.

== Results ==
1996 United States presidential election in Maine
Party	Candidate	Running mate	Votes	Percentage	Electoral votes
Democratic	Bill Clinton (incumbent)	Al Gore (incumbent)	312,788	51.62%	4
Republican	Bob Dole	Jack Kemp	186,378	30.76%	0
Reform	Ross Perot	James Campbell	85,970	14.19%	0
Green	Ralph Nader	Winona LaDuke	15,279	2.52%	0
Libertarian	Harry Browne	Jo Jorgensen	2,996	0.49%	0
U.S. Taxpayers' Party	Howard Phillips	Herbert Titus	1,517	0.25%	0
Natural Law	John Hagelin	Mike Tompkins	825	0.14%	0
No party	Write-in		144	0.02%	0

=== Results by county ===
County	Bill Clinton Democratic		Bob Dole Republican		Ross Perot Reform		Various candidates Other parties		Margin		Total votes cast
County	#	%	#	%	#	%	#	%	#	%	#
Androscoggin	26,428	56.55%	12,053	25.79%	7,079	15.15%	1,171	2.51%	14,375	30.76%	46,731
Aroostook	18,022	51.80%	10,400	29.89%	5,747	16.52%	623	1.79%	7,622	21.91%	34,792
Cumberland	69,496	53.62%	42,620	32.88%	12,696	9.80%	4,798	3.70%	26,876	20.74%	129,610
Franklin	7,759	53.16%	3,757	25.74%	2,567	17.59%	513	3.51%	4,002	27.42%	14,596
Hancock	12,256	46.34%	8,345	31.55%	4,094	15.48%	1,753	6.63%	3,911	14.79%	26,448
Kennebec	30,257	54.37%	15,403	27.68%	8,281	14.88%	1,713	3.08%	14,854	26.69%	55,654
Knox	8,839	46.81%	6,192	32.79%	2,780	14.72%	1,072	5.68%	2,647	14.02%	18,883
Lincoln	8,130	44.74%	6,372	35.06%	2,923	16.08%	748	4.12%	1,758	9.68%	18,173
Oxford	13,580	52.05%	7,238	27.74%	4,589	17.59%	684	2.62%	6,342	24.31%	26,091
Penobscot	35,961	51.00%	22,885	32.45%	9,673	13.72%	1,998	2.83%	13,076	18.55%	70,517
Piscataquis	4,343	48.69%	2,815	31.56%	1,524	17.09%	238	2.67%	1,528	17.13%	8,920
Sagadahoc	8,417	49.73%	5,346	31.59%	2,451	14.48%	710	4.20%	3,071	18.14%	16,924
Somerset	11,773	50.94%	6,247	27.03%	4,449	19.25%	642	2.78%	5,526	23.91%	23,111
Waldo	8,012	46.37%	5,318	30.78%	2,816	16.30%	1,133	6.56%	2,694	15.59%	17,279
Washington	7,198	47.39%	4,793	31.56%	2,721	17.91%	477	3.14%	2,405	15.83%	15,189
York	42,317	51.00%	26,594	32.05%	11,580	13.96%	2,488	3.00%	15,723	18.95%	82,979
Totals	312,788	51.62%	186,378	30.76%	85,970	14.19%	20,761	3.43%	126,410	20.86%	605,897

Counties that flipped from Independent to Democratic

- Piscataquis
- Somerset
- Waldo

=== By congressional district ===
Clinton won both congressional districts.

District	Clinton	Dole	Perot	Representative
1st	52.1%	31.8%	12.6%	James B. Longley Jr. (104th Congress)
1st	52.1%	31.8%	12.6%	Tom Allen (105th Congress)
2nd	51.2%	29.6%	16.0%	John Baldacci

== See also ==
- United States presidential elections in Maine
- Presidency of Bill Clinton
