= Environmental issues with salmon =

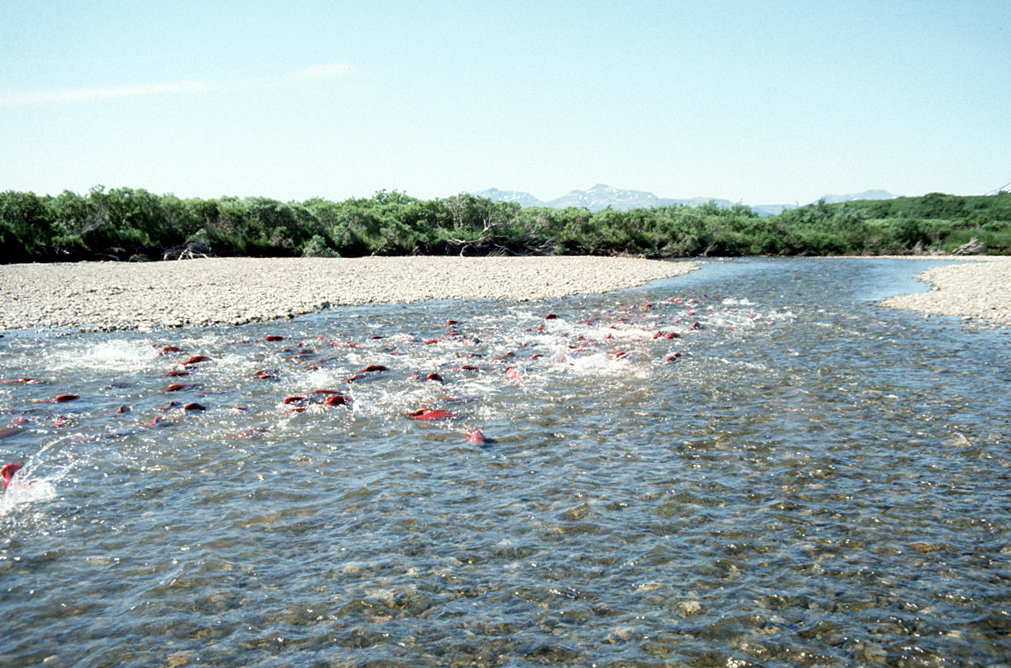
Spawning sockeye salmon in Becharof Creek, Becharof Wilderness, Alaska

Salmon population levels are of concern in the Atlantic and in some parts of the Pacific. Salmon are typically anadromous - they rear and grow in freshwater, migrate to the ocean to reach sexual maturity, and then return to freshwater to spawn. Determining how environmental stressors and climate change will affect these fisheries is challenging due to their lives split between fresh and saltwater. Environmental variables like warming temperatures and habitat loss are detrimental to salmon abundance and survival. Other human influenced effects on salmon like overfishing and gillnets, sea lice from farm raised salmon, and competition from hatchery released salmon have negative effects as well.

== Environmental pressures ==
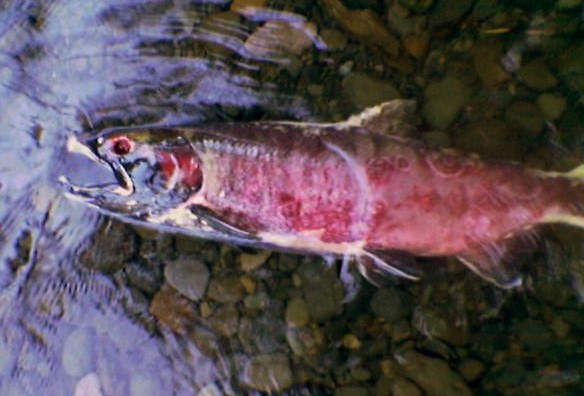
All species of Pacific salmon (not including steelhead) die shortly after spawning. This one was photographed at a spawning site along Eagle Creek in Oregon.

The population of wild salmon declined markedly in recent decades, especially North Atlantic populations which spawn in the waters of western Europe and eastern Canada, and wild salmon in the Snake and Columbia River system in the Pacific Northwest. The decline is attributed to the following factors:

=== Marine variables ===
==== Sea lice ====
The transfer of parasites from open-net cage salmon farming, especially sea lice, has reduced numbers of wild salmon. The European Commission (2002) concluded, "The reduction of wild salmonid abundance is also linked to other factors but there is more and more scientific evidence establishing a direct link between the number of lice-infested wild fish and the presence of cages in the same estuary.", however it is impossible to verify this statement from the reference provided. It is reported that wild salmon on the west coast of Canada are being driven to extinction by sea lice from nearby salmon farms. Dr Krkosek and his research group found, with their electronic modeling predictions, two of the best runs ever recorded for wild salmon instead of the expected collapsed salmon fishery. This raises real questions over the validity of the models and the dire predictions. For Atlantic salmon smolts, it takes as few as eight sea lice to kill the fish. On the Pacific Coast where the smolts are much smaller, only one or two can be critical, often resulting in death. In the Atlantic, sea lice have been a proven factor in both Norwegian and Scottish salmon declines. In the Western Atlantic, there has been little research at sea, but sea lice numbers in the period after 2000 do not appear to be a significant factor in the critical decline of endangered inner Bay of Fundy salmon. The situation may have been different in the 1980s and 1990s, but we are unlikely ever to know the factual history in that regard.

==== Overfishing and gillnets ====
In general, overfishing has reduced populations, especially commercial netting in the Faroes and Greenland. Several seafood sustainability guides have recommendations on which salmon fisheries are sustainable and which have negative impacts on salmon populations

There are many methods of harvest for the commercial salmon fishing industry, such as trolling, seining, and gillnetting. Gillnets are an extremely size-selective method of harvest, where a long net is placed in the path of the salmon's migration to their natal stream in hopes of entangling the salmon for commercial harvest. Fish too small to be caught pass through the net, fish too large cannot be entangled, only catching fish that fall somewhere in between. By selectively harvesting certain sizes of fish, governed by the mesh-size of the gillnet, some age-class and length-class fish are selectively removed from the population, progressively leaving phenotypically smaller spawners. Fecundity generally decreases with length. So, smaller fish produce fewer eggs than larger fish. There is also concern regarding the genetic information passed down from the fish. If the majority of spawning fish in a particular salmon run has gotten smaller due to the size-selective fishing methods, the run could eventually evolve to become smaller.

Gillnets are designed to harvest a specific sized fish. For example, Washington Department of Fish and Wildlife's 2010 Commercial Regulations had a 7-inch (180 mm) minimum mesh size restriction for Chinook, and a 5-inch (130 mm) minimum – 5.5-inch (140 mm) maximum for sockeye. Possible problems arising from this selective harvest are smaller reproducing adult fish, as well as the unexpected mortality of the fish which sustain injuries from the gillnet but are not retained in the fishery. Most salmon populations include several age classes, allowing for fish of different ages, and sizes, to reproduce with each other. A recent 2009 study looked at 59 years of catch and escapement data of Bristol Bay sockeye to determine age and size at maturity trends attributable to the selectivity of commercial gillnet harvests. The study found that the larger females (>550 mm) of all age classes were most susceptible to harvest. The study suggests that smaller, younger fish were more likely to successfully traverse the gillnet fishery and reproduce than the larger fish. The study also found that the average length of sockeye harvested from 1946 to 2005 was 8 mm larger than the sockeye who escaped the gillnet fishery to spawn, reducing the fecundity of the average female by 5%, or 104 eggs.

If a salmon enters a gillnet, but manages to escape, it often sustains injuries. These injuries can lead to a lower degree of reproductive success. A study aimed at quantifying mortality of Bristol Bay sockeye salmon due to gillnet-related injuries found that 11 – 29% of sockeye sustained fishery-related injuries attributable to gillnets, 51% of those fish were expected to not reproduce.

==== Competition at sea ====
Competition between juvenile salmon entering the ocean, other wild salmon, and hatchery-released salmon in the ocean is a major factor that determines survival rates. Hatchery production has increased since 1970, and there is high spatial and trophic, dietary overlap between wild and hatchery sockeye, pink and chum salmon in the North Pacific. With more competition for prey and space in the ocean, the period of maturation in saltwater before salmon reach sexual spawning age grows. Longer times spent in the ocean causes a decline in salmon survival and abundance. Also, as the human population grows, the demand for seafood increases. With more commercial fisheries, it is difficult to maintain sustainable fishing levels.

=== Freshwater variables ===
==== Warming temperatures ====
An increase in fresh water temperature can delay spawning and accelerate the transition to smolting. Warmer temperatures of streams during spawning and incubation have negative effects on salmon productivity due to pre-spawn mortality, reduced egg survival, and temporal changes during salmon embryo development. However, the effects of higher stream temperatures during juvenile rearing vary across populations and habitats. For some watersheds as temperatures increase, an increase in turbidity and reduction in invertebrate food availability is found to cause a reduction in growth rates of juvenile salmon. For other watersheds, productivity increases with more nutrients and food availability for juvenile salmon. The salmon growth rate and maturation rate increase causing an age at maturation increase. Salmon are then able to migrate to the ocean earlier.

==== Ulcerative dermal necrosis ====
Ulcerative dermal necrosis (UDN) infections of the 1970s and 1980s severely affected adult salmon in freshwater rivers.

==== Habitat ====
The loss of suitable freshwater habitat, especially degradation of stream pools and reduction of suitable material for the excavation of redds, has caused a reduction in spawning. Historically, stream pools were largely created by beavers . With their extirpation, the nurturing function of these ponds was lost. Reduced retention of the nutrients brought by the returning adult salmon in stream pools has lowered population numbers. Without stream pools, dead adult salmon tend to be washed straight back down the streams and rivers, so the nutrients are not available for the hatchlings.

The construction of dams, weirs, barriers and other "food prevention" measures bring severe adverse impacts to river habitat and on the accessibility of those habitats to salmon, particularly in the Pacific Northwest, where large numbers of dams have been built in many river systems, including over 400 in the Columbia River Basin. Other environmental factors, such as light intensity, water flow, or change in temperature, dramatically affects salmon during their migration season. Modern farming methods and various sources of pollution have resulted in loss of invertebrate diversity and population density in rivers, thus reducing food availability. Reduction in freshwater base flow in rivers and disruption of seasonal flows, because of diversions and extractions, hydroelectric power generation, irrigation schemes, barge transportation, and slackwater reservoirs, inhibit normal migratory processes and increase predation for salmon. Agricultural practices, such as the removal of riparian plants, destabilization of stream banks by livestock and irrigation processes, result in a loss of suitable low-gradient stream habitats.

== Impact of climate change ==
Climate change is affecting different types of salmon in ways from short term affects such as a decrease in population to long term affects such as evolution change. The change in temperature has left salmon most vulnerable during their egg stage, and the becoming adult stage of its life cycle (9) Climate change has caused salmon to spend less time in their natural freshwater habitat (10) (1). This type of stressor can affect the age class of salmon because it causes them to migrate at an early stage, which would cause them to delay maturation making them spend an additional year feeding in the ocean. Also, it can affect the availability for food which creates a chain reaction to their freshwater growth (1)(8).

The immediate affects consist of thermal requirements which is the critical thermal maximum for survival, and population crashes. When the water temperature increases the thermal requirements for the three species (Atlantic salmon, brown trout, and Arctic charr) are a necessity because if any other problems occur it can be predicted/anticipated by those of the biodiversity in the freshwater ecosystems (2). This can cause a population crash since the increased temperature will affect the eggs and may also bring in more diseases and illnesses towards the species (6). Although, the species may be able to adapt to the rising temperatures (7). These species of fish help support and provide for important fisheries in Western Europe, so, according to a scholarly journal their research finding say that salmon populations changes from environmental issues has a massive affect many other populations in distant habitats (2)(3). The long term affects from climate change produce more selection pressures in different parts of salmon's life such as Juvenile growth, development rates, thermal tolerance, and disease resistance. Which shows that because of increased anthropogenic activity, or human-caused, formed these additional stressors on Salmons stages of life (4)(5).

== North America ==
Salmon fishery stocks are still abundant, and catches have been on the rise in recent decades, after the state of Alaska initiated limitations in 1972. Some of the most important Alaskan salmon sustainable wild fisheries are located near the Kenai River, Copper River, and in Bristol Bay. Fish farming of Pacific salmon is outlawed in the United States Exclusive Economic Zone, however, there is a substantial network of publicly funded hatcheries, and the State of Alaska's fisheries management system is viewed as a leader in the management of wild fish stocks. In Canada, returning Skeena River wild salmon support commercial, subsistence and recreational fisheries, as well as the area's diverse wildlife on the coast and around communities hundreds of miles inland in the watershed. The status of wild salmon in Washington is mixed. Out of 435 wild stocks of salmon and steelhead, only 187 of them were classified as healthy; 113 had an unknown status, 1 was extinct, 12 were in critical condition and 122 were experiencing depressed populations from a study from 1997.

The Columbia River salmon population is now less than 3% of what it was when Lewis and Clark arrived at the river. Salmon canneries established by settlers beginning in 1866 had a strong negative impact on the salmon population. In his 1908 State of the Union address, U.S. President Theodore Roosevelt observed that the fisheries were in significant decline:

The salmon fisheries of the Columbia River are now but a fraction of what they were twenty—five years ago, and what they would be now if the United States Government had taken complete charge of them by intervening between Oregon and Washington. During these twenty—five years the fishermen of each State have naturally tried to take all they could get, and the two legislatures have never been able to agree on joint action of any kind adequate in degree for the protection of the fisheries. At the moment the fishing on the Oregon side is practically closed, while there is no limit on the Washington side of any kind, and no one can tell what the courts will decide as to the very statutes under which this action and non—action result. Meanwhile very few salmon reach the spawning grounds, and probably four years hence the fisheries will amount to nothing; and this comes from a struggle between the associated, or gill—net, fishermen on the one hand, and the owners of the fishing wheels up the river.

The commercial salmon fisheries in California have been either severely curtailed or closed completely in recent years, due to critically low returns on the Klamath and or Sacramento Rivers, causing millions of dollars in losses to commercial fishermen. Both Atlantic and Pacific salmon are popular sportfish.

Pacific salmon populations now exist in all the Great Lakes. Coho stocks were planted in the late 1960s in response to the growing population of non-native alewife by the state of Michigan. Now Chinook (King), Atlantic, and Coho (silver) salmon are annually stocked in all Great Lakes by most bordering states and provinces. These populations are not self-sustaining and do not provide much in the way of a commercial fishery, but have led to the development of a thriving sportfishery.

== Outside of North America ==
Native Pacific salmon populations exist in China, Taiwan, Korea, Japan, and Russia. Introduced and sustaining populations of Pacific salmon are found in New Zealand, Chile, Argentina, and the Falkland Islands.

Native Atlantic salmon populations outside of North America are found in much of coastal Europe, as well as Greenland, Iceland, the Faroe Islands, and the northwestern part of Russia. Introduced populations of Atlantic salmon, both the common anadromous life cycle and the less common land-locked life cycle, are found in many locations outside of the native range. Norway considers Pacific salmon as an alien and invasive species.

== Relief efforts ==
Several governments and nongovernmental organizations (NGOs) are sharing in research and habitat restoration efforts to relieve this situation.

- In the western Atlantic, the Atlantic Salmon Federation has developed a major sonic tracking technology program to understand the high at-sea mortality since the early 1990s. Ocean arrays are deployed across the Baie des Chaleurs and between Newfoundland and Labrador at the Strait of Belle Isle. Salmon have now been tracked halfway from rivers, such as the Restigouche, to Greenland feeding grounds. Now, the first line of the Ocean Tracking Network initiative is installed by DFO and Dalhousie University of Halifax, from Halifax to the edge of the continental shelf. First results include Atlantic salmon travelling from the Penobscot River in Maine, the "anchor river" for US Atlantic salmon populations.
- In the northern Atlantic, the North Atlantic Salmon Fund, led by Icelandic entrepreneur Orri Vigfússon, has worked closely since 1989 with governments and fishermen for conservation. The conservation efforts are not limited to oceans, and a sustainable angling scheme has been developed in rivers, notably in Vopnafjörður, Iceland.
- Throughout the Pacific Rim, the Wild Salmon Center partners with communities, businesses, governments, and other non-profits to protect and preserve healthy salmon ecosystems and the biodiversity on which these ecosystems depend.
- In California, the Golden State Salmon Association partners with conservation and environmental justice organizations, Tribes and fishing groups to protect the state’s salmon runs through water policy, habitat restoration, fish hatchery improvements, strategic litigation, and experiential learning programs.

Results overall show estuary problems exist for some rivers, but issues involving feeding grounds at sea are impacting populations as well. In 2008, returns were markedly improved for Atlantic salmon on both sides of the Atlantic Ocean, but no one knows if this is a temporary improvement or sign of a trend.

- NOAA's Office of Protected Resources maintains a list of Endangered Species, the Endangered Species Act.
- Sweden has generated a protection program as part of its Biodiversity Action Plan.
- State of Salmon maintains an IUCN red list of endangered salmon.
- The Kamchatka Peninsula, in the Russian Far East, contains the world's greatest salmon sanctuary.
- Bear Lake, Alaska, has been the site of salmon enhancement activities since 1962.

In the Pacific Northwest, one of the most notable relief efforts is the Puget Sound Partnership. The Puget Sound Partnership is currently working to implement policy change at the local level to alter the fate of salmon. Salmon recovery is guided by implementation of the Puget Sound Salmon Recovery Plan, adopted by the National Oceanic and Atmospheric Administration (NOAA) in January 2007. This recovery plan was developed by Shared Strategy, a grassroots collaborative effort to protect and restore salmon runs across Puget Sound. The Puget Sound Partnership has now rehabilitated over 800 acres of salmon habitat and it plans to continue to fight nearshore development and human impact affecting important salmon ecosystems. The Partnership's Action Agenda plans to instigate the Elwha Dam removal, begin restoration of the Nisqually Estuary and removal of derelict Fishing gear, and continue with the current salmon Recovery Plan. In order to ensure the future of Pacific Northwest salmon, the Partnership continues to encourage Stormwater & Low Impact Development, and advocates the "Puget Sound Starts Here" public education program.

Another notable local relief effort is the People for Puget Sound. People for Puget Sound is a citizen group founded by Kathy Fletcher in 1991 working to restore the health of our local land and waters with help from volunteers in the Puget Sound basin.

Sweden will stop salmon fishing in Baltic Sea in 2013 to protect it.
