= 2008 Maine Republican presidential caucuses =

- February 1, 2008
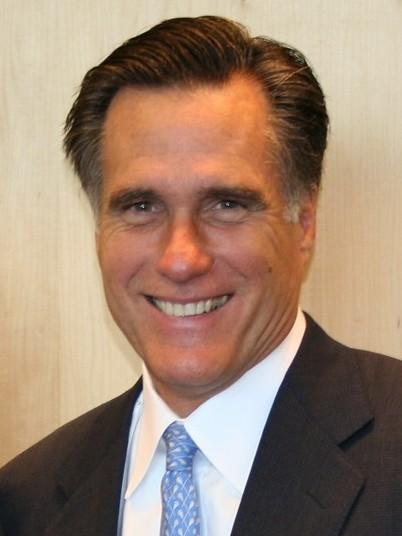

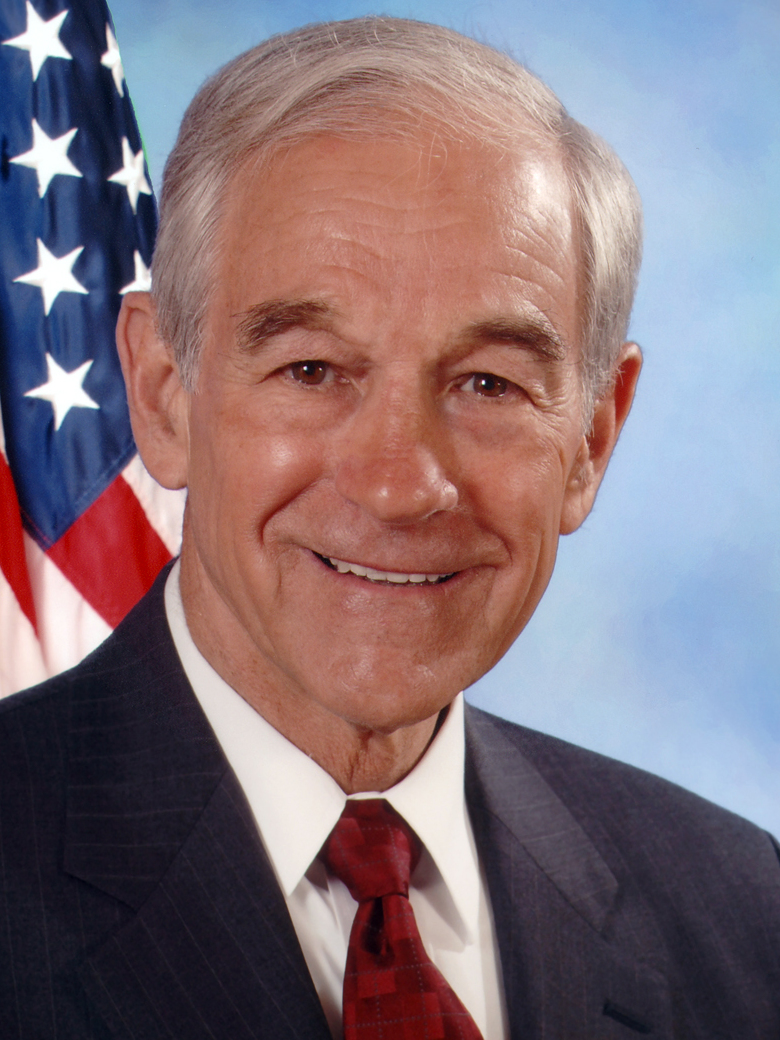

Candidate	Mitt Romney	John McCain
Home state	Massachusetts	Arizona
Delegate count	0	12
Popular vote	2,837	1,176
Percentage	51.7%	21.4%
Candidate	Ron Paul	Mike Huckabee
Home state	Texas	Arkansas
Delegate count	1	0
Popular vote	1,002	318
Percentage	18.3%	5.8%
- County results Mitt Romney John McCain Ron Paul

The 2008 Maine Republican presidential caucuses were held on February 1, February 2, and February 3 at various locations throughout the state of Maine. The results were used to apportion 21 delegates for the state. The Maine Republican caucuses were the first caucuses in the 2008 election season in which Rudy Giuliani was out of the race.

== Process ==
The Maine Republican caucus is a modified closed caucus. New voters and voters who have not declared a party may register as Republicans 30 minutes before the caucus begins. Otherwise, a voter must have been registered Republican 15 days before the caucus. In addition, those who turn 18 by the general election are eligible to register at the caucus site. The delegates chosen at the caucuses are actually non-binding; this means that they will not be bound to any specific candidate.

Like most Republican Party caucuses, there are two components to the Maine caucuses. First, delegates are elected from the attendees. These delegates later represent the caucusgoers at the state convention in May. Candidates generally provide slates of delegates to voters who are interested in supporting them, and voters can ask prospective delegates whom they support for president. A total of 3,867 delegates were selected statewide in 2008. Then, a straw poll, called a presidential preference ballot, is taken of the individuals in the room. The results of this secret ballot are transmitted to the media, who use it as a "snapshot" of the opinions of Maine Republicans. Although the media report the results of the ballot, and assign delegates appropriately, it is the state convention which determines who actually goes to the Republican National Convention. Even after the state convention, all delegates remain unbound to any candidate.

In 2008, although some caucuses were held on February 3, this was the day of Super Bowl XLII and county parties were discouraged from holding caucuses for fear of low turnout. Only three caucuses were scheduled for that day. Thus, the party released results statewide for the media on the evening of February 2.

== Campaign ==
Since Maine is adjacent to New Hampshire, Mainers have the benefit of traveling to New Hampshire to look at the candidates, and spillover coverage from the New Hampshire primary, traditionally the first primary election of the nominating process. Some candidates traveled to Maine during the 2008 campaign on visits to New Hampshire. Rudy Giuliani visited the state in September, 2007. Many candidates mobilized supporters. Further visits to the state were expected to be few, given that the Maine caucuses were sandwiched between the prominent Florida primary and Super Tuesday. However, Ron Paul visited the state in the end of January, five days before the caucuses.

By the time of the caucus, Ron Paul was the only presidential candidate still in the race who had visited Maine to campaign, but Mitt Romney's oldest son, Tagg, campaigned for him there.

Some residents have criticized the caucus system, complaining that it disenfranchises the elderly and military service-members and discourages turnout.

== Results ==
Maine 2008 Presidential Preference Survey Results:

100% of precincts reporting
Candidate	State Delegates	Percentage	Delegates
Mitt Romney	2,837	51.67%	0
John McCain	1,176	21.42%	12
Ron Paul	1,002	18.25%	1
Mike Huckabee	318	5.79%	0
Fred Thompson*	8	0.15%	0
Rudy Giuliani*	3	0.05%	0
Alan Keyes	1	0.02%	0
Uncommitted	136	2.48%	8
Write-in	9	0.16%	0
Total	5,491	100%	21

* Candidate dropped out of the race before the caucuses

Paul supporters succeeded in selecting a single Paul delegate at the district conventions on May 3, while the state convention selected a slate of 12 McCain supporters. The National Committeeman, the National Committeewoman, and the chairman of the Maine's Republican Party also attended the convention as unpledged delegates, where they voted for McCain.

== See also ==
- 2008 Maine Democratic presidential caucuses
- 2008 Republican Party presidential primaries
