= 2008 Maine Democratic presidential caucuses =

- February 10, 2008

Candidate	Barack Obama	Hillary Clinton
Home state	Illinois	New York
Delegate count	15	9
Popular vote	2,079	1,397
Percentage	59.30%	39.85%
- County results Obama: 50–60% 60–70% 70–80% Clinton: 50–60% 60–70%

The 2008 Maine Democratic presidential caucuses took place on February 10, 2008, and had 24 delegates at stake. The winner in each of Maine's two congressional districts received all of that district's total delegates, which totaled 16. Another eight delegates were awarded to the statewide winner, Barack Obama, at the Maine Democratic Party Statewide Convention on May 31, 2008. These 24 delegates represented Maine at the Democratic National Convention in Denver, Colorado. Another 10 unpledged delegates, known as superdelegates, also attended the convention and cast their votes as well.

Although Maine technically sent 24 pledged delegates to the Democratic National Convention, John Knutson, the superdelegate Chairman of the Maine Democratic Party, had pledged to support whoever won the majority of the vote, making the total number of pledged delegates effectively 25.

== Process ==
The Maine Democratic Caucus was a closed caucus open to all Democratic voters. New voters and nonpartisan voters could register as Democrats at the door, while members of other parties must have changed their party registration by January 26, 2008. In addition, absentee ballots were permitted for the disabled and those in the military who could not personally attend.

At the caucus, participants gathered in groups among presidential preference. Unlike most other caucuses, there was no 15-percent minimum threshold, as long as a candidate had enough votes to elect a whole delegate after rounding. Re-caucusing after the first preference groups was divided was permitted among all participants. After dividing presidential delegates, voters were elected to be delegates to the Maine Democratic Party State Convention on May 31, 2008, pledged but not bound to their candidate. Only state delegates are reported by the party. At the state level, delegates were selected for the Democratic National Convention; these delegates were bound.

== Results ==
=== Municipal Caucus Results ===
Caucus Date: February 10, 2008

National Pledged Delegates Determined: 0 (of 24)

2008 Maine Democratic Presidential Caucus Results
Party	Candidate	Votes	Percentage	Delegates
Democratic	Barack Obama	2,079	59.30%	15
Democratic	Hillary Clinton	1,397	39.85%	9
Democratic	Uncommitted	27	0.77%	0
Democratic	Others	3	0.09%	0
Totals		3,506	100.00%	24
Voter turnout		%		—

=== State Convention Results ===
Caucus Date: May 31, 2008 National Pledged Delegates Determined: 24 (of 24)

== See also ==
- 2008 Democratic Party presidential primaries
- 2008 Maine Republican presidential caucuses
