= 1856 United States presidential election in Maine =

- November 4, 1856
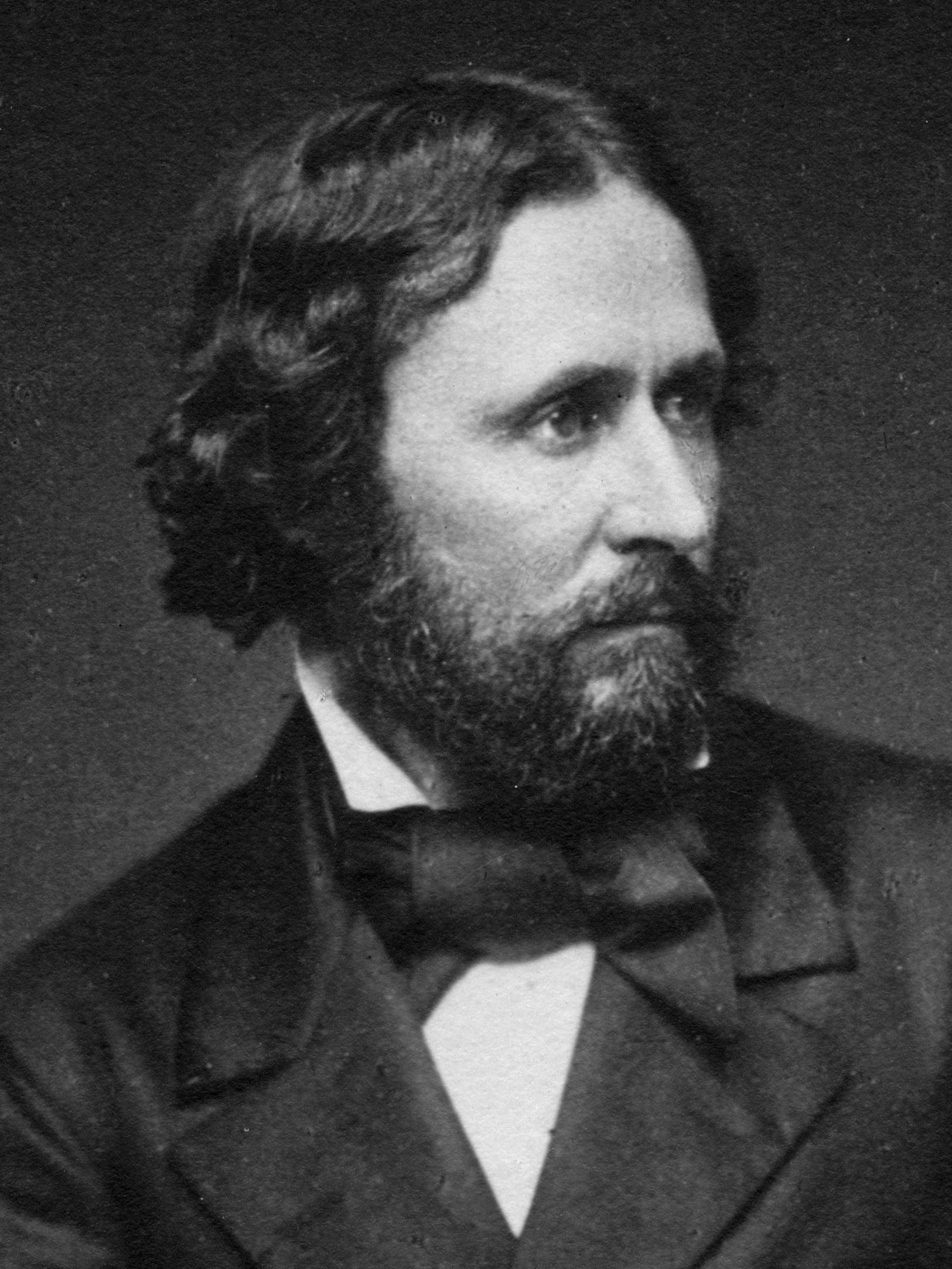

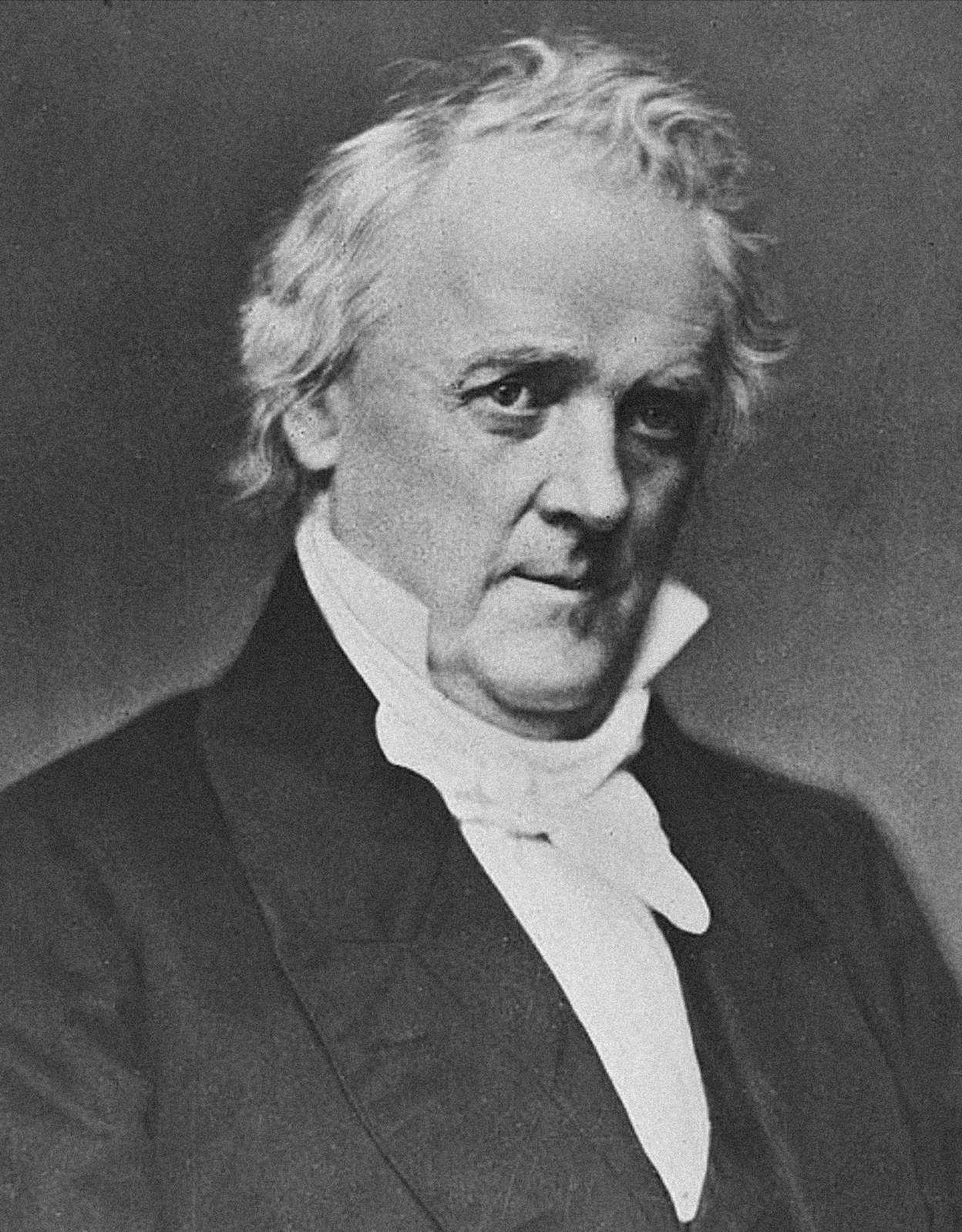
| Nominee | John C. Frémont | James Buchanan |
| Party | Republican | Democratic |
| Home state | California | Pennsylvania |
| Running mate | William L. Dayton | John C. Breckinridge |
| Electoral vote | 8 | 0 |
| Popular vote | 67,279 | 39,140 |
| Percentage | 61.34% | 35.68% |
County results
Frémont
50–60%
60–70%
70–80%
President before election
Franklin Pierce
Democratic
Elected President
James Buchanan
Democratic

The 1856 United States presidential election in Maine took place on November 4, 1856, as part of the 1856 United States presidential election. Voters chose eight representatives, or electors to the Electoral College, who voted for president and vice president.

Maine voted for the Republican candidate, John C. Frémont, over the Democratic candidate, James Buchanan, and the Know Nothing candidate, Millard Fillmore. Frémont won the state by a margin of 25.66%.

With 61.34% of the popular vote, Maine would prove to be Frémont's third strongest state in the 1856 election after Vermont and Massachusetts.

== Results ==
1856 United States presidential election in Maine
| Party | Candidate | Votes | % |
|---|---|---|---|
| Republican | John C. Frémont | 67,279 | 61.34% |
| Democratic | James Buchanan | 39,140 | 35.68% |
| Know Nothing | Millard Fillmore | 3,270 | 2.98% |
| Total votes | | 109,689 | 100% |

=== Results by County ===
1856 United States Presidential Election in Maine (By County)
| County | John C. Frémont Republican | | James Buchanan Democratic | | Millard Fillmore Know Nothing | | Total |
| County | # | % | # | % | # | % | Total |
|---|---|---|---|---|---|---|---|
| Androscoggin | 3,388 | 64.25% | 1,699 | 32.22% | 186 | 3.53% | 5,273 |
| Aroostook | 837 | 51.04% | 795 | 48.48% | 8 | 0.49% | 1,640 |
| Cumberland | 8,211 | 58.34% | 5,258 | 37.36% | 605 | 4.30% | 14,074 |
| Franklin | 2,529 | 64.71% | 1,358 | 34.75% | 21 | 0.54% | 3,908 |
| Hancock | 3,667 | 61.42% | 2,142 | 35.88% | 161 | 2.70% | 5,970 |
| Kennebec | 7,320 | 72.14% | 2,487 | 24.51% | 340 | 3.35% | 10,147 |
| Lincoln | 4,935 | 55.29% | 3,598 | 40.31% | 392 | 4.39% | 8,925 |
| Oxford | 4,364 | 58.12% | 3,116 | 41.50% | 28 | 0.37% | 7,508 |
| Penobscot | 7,861 | 65.54% | 3,793 | 31.62% | 341 | 2.84% | 11,995 |
| Piscataquis | 1,734 | 63.15% | 915 | 33.32% | 97 | 3.53% | 2,746 |
| Sagadahoc | 2,956 | 68.95% | 934 | 21.79% | 397 | 9.26% | 4,287 |
| Somerset | 4,283 | 64.64% | 1,926 | 29.07% | 417 | 6.29% | 6,626 |
| Waldo | 5,159 | 61.34% | 3,138 | 37.31% | 114 | 1.36% | 8,411 |
| Washington | 3,299 | 52.95% | 2,867 | 46.02% | 64 | 1.03% | 6,230 |
| York | 6,636 | 56.03% | 5,054 | 42.67% | 154 | 1.30% | 11,844 |
| Totals | 67,179 | 61.30% | 39,080 | 35.66% | 3,325 | 3.03% | 109,584 |

== See also ==
- United States presidential elections in Maine
