= 1960 United States presidential election in Maine =

- November 8, 1960

Nominee	Richard Nixon	John F. Kennedy
Party	Republican	Democratic
Home state	California	Massachusetts
Running mate	Henry Cabot Lodge Jr.	Lyndon B. Johnson
Electoral vote	5	0
Popular vote	240,608	181,159
Percentage	57.05%	42.95%

Nixon
50–60%
60–70%
70–80%
80–90%
90–100%
Kennedy
50–60%
60–70%
70–80%
80–90%
90–100%
Tie
50%
President before election
Dwight D. Eisenhower
Republican
Elected President
John F. Kennedy
Democratic

The 1960 United States presidential election in Maine took place on November 8, 1960, as part of the 1960 United States presidential election, which was held throughout all 50 states. Voters chose five representatives, or electors to the Electoral College, who voted for president and vice president.

Maine voted for the Republican nominee, Vice President Richard Nixon of California, over the Democratic nominee, Senator John F. Kennedy of Massachusetts. Nixon ran with Ambassador Henry Cabot Lodge Jr. of Massachusetts, while Kennedy ran with Senate Majority Leader Lyndon B. Johnson of Texas. Nixon carried Maine by a margin of 14.10%. This is the most recent election in which Maine voted more Republican than the sole state bordering it, New Hampshire.

== Results ==
1960 United States presidential election in Maine
Party	Candidate	Votes	Percentage	Electoral votes
Republican	Richard Nixon	240,608	57.05%	5
Democratic	John F. Kennedy	181,159	42.94%	0
Write-ins	Write-ins	6	0.01%	0
Totals		421,773	100.00%	5

=== Results by county ===
County	Richard Nixon Republican		John F. Kennedy Democratic		Various Candidates Write-ins		Margin		Total votes cast
County	#	%	#	%	#	%	#	%	Total votes cast
Androscoggin	14,654	35.96%	26,097	64.04%			-11,443	-28.08%	40,751
Aroostook	18,698	55.82%	14,799	44.18%			3,899	11.64%	33,497
Cumberland	47,271	58.49%	33,553	41.51%	1	0.00%	13,718	16.98%	80,825
Franklin	6,136	65.00%	3,304	35.00%			2,832	30.00%	9,440
Hancock	12,119	78.27%	3,363	21.72%	1	0.01%	8,756	56.55%	15,483
Kennebec	21,699	54.31%	18,252	45.69%			3,447	8.62%	39,951
Knox	9,083	70.41%	3,816	29.58%	1	0.01%	5,267	40.83%	12,900
Lincoln	7,562	76.39%	2,337	23.61%			5,225	52.78%	9,899
Oxford	11,715	56.69%	8,951	43.31%			2,764	13.38%	20,666
Penobscot	28,459	59.75%	19,175	40.25%			9,284	19.50%	47,634
Piscataquis	4,959	63.43%	2,859	36.57%			2,100	26.86%	7,818
Sagadahoc	6,386	61.69%	3,965	38.31%			2,421	23.38%	10,351
Somerset	10,142	59.32%	6,956	40.68%			3,186	18.64%	17,098
Waldo	6,844	70.64%	2,845	29.36%			3,999	41.28%	9,689
Washington	9,118	65.91%	4,716	34.09%			4,402	31.82%	13,834
York	25,763	49.60%	26,171	50.39%	3	0.01%	-408	-0.79%	51,937
Totals	240,608	57.05%	181,159	42.95%	6	0.00%	59,449	14.10%	421,773

==== Counties that flipped from Republican to Democratic ====
- Androscoggin
- York

== See also ==
- United States presidential elections in Maine
