= 1988 United States presidential election in Maine =

- November 8, 1988

| Nominee | George H. W. Bush | Michael Dukakis |
| Party | Republican | Democratic |
| Home state | Texas | Massachusetts |
| Running mate | Dan Quayle | Lloyd Bentsen |
| Electoral vote | 4 | 0 |
| Popular vote | 307,131 | 243,569 |
| Percentage | 55.34% | 43.88% |

Bush
40–50%
50–60%
60–70%
70–80%
80–90%
Dukakis
40–50%
50–60%
60–70%
70–80%
80–90%
Tie
President before election
Ronald Reagan
Republican
Elected President
George H. W. Bush
Republican

The 1988 United States presidential election in Maine took place on November 8, 1988, as part of the 1988 United States presidential election, which was held throughout all 50 states and D.C. Voters chose four representatives, or electors to the Electoral College, who voted for president and vice president.

Maine voted for the Republican nominee, Vice President George H. W. Bush, over the Democratic nominee, Massachusetts Governor Michael Dukakis, by a margin of 11.45%. Bush took 55.34% of the vote to Dukakis’ 43.88%, and swept every county in the state.

Bush's comfortable win was expected, due to the state's Republican lean at the time, and the Bush family ties to the state (Bush owned a house in Kennebunkport, Maine). As of the 2024 presidential election, this is the last time that a Republican presidential nominee would carry the state of Maine as a whole, the 1st congressional district, or the counties of Cumberland, Hancock, Knox, Sagadahoc and York. Like the rest of liberal and secular New England, Maine would subsequently begin to drift towards the Democratic Party as the GOP became increasingly dominated by conservatives, Southerners, and Evangelical Christians, and is now considered a likely blue state.

However, Maine's 2nd congressional district would give its electoral vote to Republican Donald Trump in 2016, 2020, and 2024. Androscoggin, Aroostook, Franklin, Kennebec, Oxford, and Somerset counties would not vote Republican again until 2016.

Despite winning every county in the state this election, Bush would not win a single one during his re-election bid in 1992, and would in fact come in third place in the state behind Democrat Bill Clinton and independent candidate Ross Perot.

== Results ==
1988 United States presidential election in Maine
| Party | Candidate | Votes | Percentage | Electoral votes |
|---|---|---|---|---|
| Republican | George H. W. Bush | 307,131 | 55.34% | 4 |
| Democratic | Michael Dukakis | 243,569 | 43.88% | 0 |
| Libertarian | Ron Paul | 2,700 | 0.49% | 0 |
| New Alliance | Lenora Fulani | 1,405 | 0.25% | 0 |
| No party | Write-ins | 230 | 0.04% | 0 |
| Totals | | 555,035 | 100.00% | 4 |
| Voter Turnout (Voting age/Registered) | | | | 62%/65% |

=== By congressional district ===
Bush won both congressional districts, including one held by a Democrat.

| District | Bush | Dukakis | Representative |
|---|---|---|---|
| 1st | 55.92% | 43.29% | Joseph E. Brennan |
| 2nd | 54.64% | 44.59% | Olympia Snowe |

=== Results by county ===
| County | George H.W. Bush Republican | | Michael Dukakis Democratic | | Ron Paul Libertarian | | Various candidates Other parties | | Margin | | Total votes cast |
| County | # | % | # | % | # | % | # | % | # | % | Total votes cast |
|---|---|---|---|---|---|---|---|---|---|---|---|
| Androscoggin | 23,061 | 51.72% | 21,165 | 47.47% | 203 | 0.46% | 156 | 0.35% | 1,896 | 4.25% | 44,585 |
| Aroostook | 17,213 | 53.38% | 14,850 | 46.05% | 101 | 0.31% | 82 | 0.25% | 2,363 | 7.33% | 32,246 |
| Cumberland | 63,028 | 52.93% | 55,220 | 46.37% | 566 | 0.48% | 261 | 0.22% | 7,808 | 6.56% | 119,075 |
| Franklin | 7,180 | 54.16% | 5,960 | 44.96% | 70 | 0.53% | 46 | 0.35% | 1,220 | 9.20% | 13,256 |
| Hancock | 12,957 | 56.07% | 9,929 | 42.97% | 146 | 0.63% | 75 | 0.32% | 3,028 | 13.10% | 23,107 |
| Kennebec | 27,734 | 53.60% | 23,578 | 45.57% | 220 | 0.43% | 213 | 0.41% | 4,156 | 8.03% | 51,745 |
| Knox | 10,156 | 57.54% | 7,343 | 41.60% | 100 | 0.57% | 51 | 0.29% | 2,813 | 15.94% | 17,650 |
| Lincoln | 9,837 | 61.79% | 5,939 | 37.31% | 99 | 0.62% | 45 | 0.28% | 3,898 | 24.48% | 15,920 |
| Oxford | 13,568 | 55.91% | 10,523 | 43.37% | 108 | 0.45% | 67 | 0.28% | 3,045 | 12.54% | 24,266 |
| Penobscot | 34,912 | 54.76% | 28,429 | 44.59% | 241 | 0.38% | 172 | 0.27% | 6,483 | 10.17% | 63,754 |
| Piscataquis | 4,788 | 58.27% | 3,323 | 40.44% | 70 | 0.85% | 36 | 0.44% | 1,465 | 17.83% | 8,217 |
| Sagadahoc | 8,825 | 58.22% | 6,212 | 40.98% | 70 | 0.46% | 51 | 0.34% | 2,613 | 17.24% | 15,158 |
| Somerset | 11,430 | 56.58% | 8,603 | 42.59% | 98 | 0.49% | 70 | 0.35% | 2,827 | 13.99% | 20,201 |
| Waldo | 8,236 | 55.73% | 6,402 | 43.32% | 80 | 0.54% | 60 | 0.41% | 1,834 | 12.41% | 14,778 |
| Washington | 7,872 | 56.93% | 5,831 | 42.17% | 69 | 0.50% | 56 | 0.40% | 2,041 | 14.76% | 13,828 |
| York | 46,334 | 59.98% | 30,262 | 39.17% | 459 | 0.59% | 194 | 0.25% | 16,072 | 20.81% | 77,249 |
| Totals | 307,131 | 55.34% | 243,569 | 43.88% | 2,700 | 0.49% | 1,635 | 0.29% | 63,562 | 11.46% | 555,035 |

== See also ==
- United States presidential elections in Maine
- Presidency of George H. W. Bush
