= 1992 United States presidential election in Maine =

- November 3, 1992

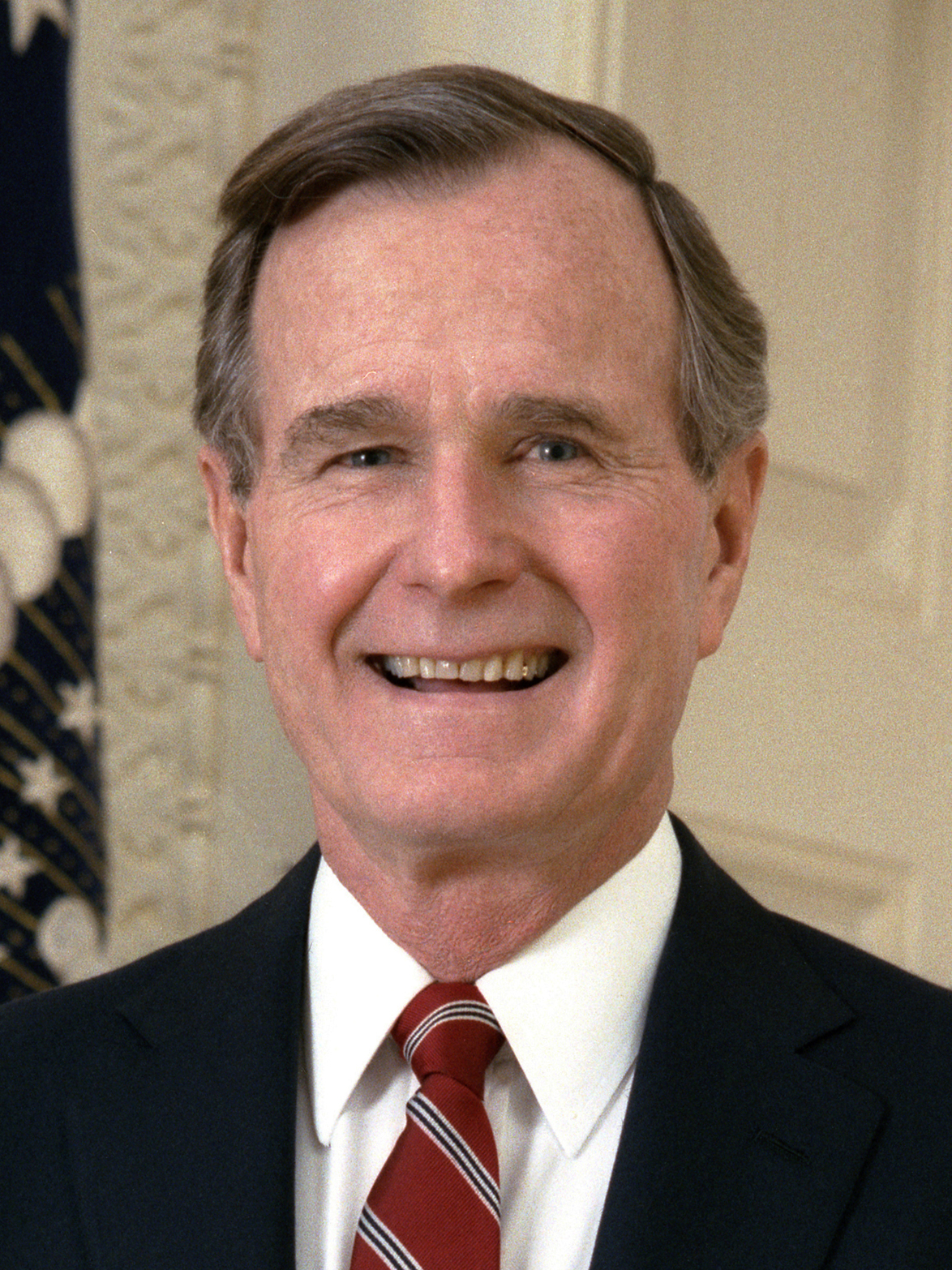
Nominee	Bill Clinton	Ross Perot	George H. W. Bush
Party	Democratic	Independent	Republican
Home state	Arkansas	Texas	Texas
Running mate	Al Gore	James Stockdale	Dan Quayle
Electoral vote	4	0	0
Popular vote	263,420	206,820	206,504
Percentage	38.77%	30.44%	30.39%

Clinton
30–40%
40–50%
50–60%
60–70%
90–100%
Perot
30–40%
40–50%
50–60%
70–80%
Bush
30–40%
40–50%
50–60%
80–90%
Tie
President before election
George H. W. Bush
Republican
Elected President
Bill Clinton
Democratic

The 1992 United States presidential election in Maine took place on November 3, 1992, as part of the 1992 United States presidential election. Voters chose four representatives, or electors to the Electoral College, who voted for president and vice president.

Maine was won by Governor Bill Clinton (D-Arkansas) with 38.77% of the popular vote over businessman Ross Perot (I-Texas) with 30.44%. Incumbent president George H. W. Bush (R-Texas) finished in third, close behind Perot, with 30.39% of the popular vote. Despite the Bush family having strong ties to Maine, most notably owning a home in the town of Kennebunkport, Perot beat Bush for second place in the state by a margin of 316 votes. Maine was one of two states where Perot finished in second place (along with Utah, where Clinton finished in third place), though Maine was the only state of the two where Perot won any counties. Clinton ultimately won the national vote, defeating both Bush and Perot.

Perot's 30.44% in Maine would make it his strongest state in the nation. Perot came within 4.55% of winning an electoral vote from Maine's 2nd congressional district, making it the closest he came to winning an electoral vote. In Maine's 1st congressional district, Bush finished in second place.

Clinton was the first Democrat to carry Maine since 1968, when then-Vice President Hubert Humphrey chose Maine Senator Edmund Muskie as his running mate. Maine has not voted Republican in any subsequent presidential elections, though Donald Trump would win the electoral vote from the second congressional district in 2016, 2020, and 2024.

As of 2026, this is the last time that a major party candidate finished in third place in a state or that a non-major party candidate would come in second place or better. It is also the only time since 1968 that a Republican candidate failed to come in second place or better in a state.

== Results ==
1992 United States presidential election in Maine
Party	Candidate	Votes	Percentage	Electoral votes
Democratic	Bill Clinton	263,420	38.77%	4
Independent	Ross Perot	206,820	30.44%	0
Republican	George H. W. Bush (incumbent)	206,504	30.39%	0
Libertarian	Andre Marrou	1,681	0.25%	0
New Alliance	Lenora Fulani	519	0.08%	0
U.S. Taxpayers'	Howard Phillips	464	0.07%	0
Write-ins		91	0.01%	0
Totals		679,499	100.0%	4
Voter Turnout (Voting age/Registered)				72%/70%

=== By congressional district ===
Clinton won both of Maine's congressional districts, including one held by a Republican.

District	Clinton	Bush	Perot	Representative
1st	39.9%	31.8%	28.3%	Thomas Andrews
2nd	37.8%	29.0%	33.2%	Olympia Snowe

=== Results by county ===
County	Bill Clinton Democratic		Ross Perot Independent		George H.W. Bush Republican		Andre Marrou Libertarian		Various candidates Other parties		Margin (Note: Because Perot finished ahead of Bush in Maine as a whole, all margins given are Clinton minus Perot unless stated in the total for the county in question.)		Total votes cast
County	#	%	#	%	#	%	#	%	#	%	#	%	Total votes cast
Androscoggin	22,247	40.34%	18,518	33.58%	14,174	25.70%	114	0.21%	91	0.17%	3,729	6.76%	55,144
Aroostook	15,682	40.64%	10,376	26.89%	12,409	32.16%	46	0.12%	72	0.19%	3,273 (Note: In this county where Bush did run second ahead of Perot, the margin given is that between Clinton and Bush.)	8.48%	38,585
Cumberland	60,781	42.95%	34,443	24.34%	45,752	32.33%	373	0.26%	173	0.12%	15,029	10.62%	141,522
Franklin	6,739	40.79%	5,115	30.96%	4,608	27.89%	37	0.22%	24	0.15%	1,624	9.83%	16,523
Hancock	10,126	35.15%	9,865	34.25%	8,657	30.05%	75	0.26%	82	0.28%	261	0.90%	28,805
Kennebec	25,125	39.31%	21,436	33.54%	17,135	26.81%	126	0.20%	99	0.15%	3,689	5.77%	63,921
Knox	7,631	37.52%	6,303	30.99%	6,310	31.03%	62	0.30%	32	0.16%	1,321	6.49%	20,338
Lincoln	6,714	35.27%	5,808	30.51%	6,405	33.65%	78	0.49%	31	0.19%	309	1.62%	19,036
Oxford	11,202	38.16%	9,815	33.43%	8,194	27.91%	89	0.30%	56	0.19%	1,387	4.73%	29,356
Penobscot	29,485	36.65%	26,437	32.86%	24,218	30.11%	175	0.22%	129	0.16%	3,048	3.79%	80,444
Piscataquis	3,323	33.13%	3,688	36.77%	2,970	29.61%	38	0.38%	12	0.12%	-365	-3.64%	10,031
Sagadahoc	6,828	36.88%	5,705	30.82%	5,917	31.96%	41	0.22%	22	0.12%	911	4.92%	18,513
Somerset	9,274	35.10%	10,293	38.95%	6,780	25.66%	45	0.17%	32	0.12%	-1,019	-3.85%	26,424
Waldo	6,472	34.93%	6,702	36.17%	5,241	28.29%	77	0.42%	37	0.20%	-230	-1.24%	18,529
Washington	6,284	35.37%	5,894	33.18%	5,493	30.92%	60	0.34%	34	0.19%	390	2.19%	17,765
York	35,507	37.55%	26,422	27.94%	32,241	34.09%	245	0.26%	148	0.16%	3,266	3.46%	94,563
Totals	263,420	38.77%	206,820	30.44%	206,504	30.39%	1,681	0.25%	1,074	0.16%	56,600	8.33%	679,499

==== Counties that flipped from Republican to Democratic ====
- Androscoggin
- Aroostook
- Cumberland
- Franklin
- Hancock
- Kennebec
- Knox
- Lincoln
- Oxford
- Penobscot
- Sagadahoc
- Washington
- York

==== Counties that flipped from Republican to Independent ====
- Piscataquis
- Somerset
- Waldo

== See also ==
- United States presidential elections in Maine
- Presidency of Bill Clinton
