= National Register of Historic Places listings in Piscataquis County, Maine =

Location of Piscataquis County in Maine

This is a list of the National Register of Historic Places listings in Piscataquis County, Maine.

This is intended to be a complete list of the properties and districts on the National Register of Historic Places in Piscataquis County, Maine, United States. Latitude and longitude coordinates are provided for many National Register properties and districts; these locations may be seen together in a map.

There are 59 properties and districts listed on the National Register in the county. Another 3 properties were once listed, but have since been removed.

This National Park Service list is complete through NPS recent listings posted May 1, 2026.

Contents: Counties and municipalities in Maine
Androscoggin - Aroostook - Cumberland (City of Portland) - Franklin - Hancock - Kennebec - Knox - Lincoln - Oxford - Penobscot - Piscataquis - Sagadahoc - Somerset - Waldo - Washington - York

== Current listings ==
	Name on the Register	Image	Date listed	Location	City or town	Description
1	Ambajejus Boom House	Ambajejus Boom House	April 2, 1973 (#73000145)	About 11 miles (18 km) northwest of Millinocket and Ambajejus Lake; 45°43′57″N 68°53′42″W	Northeast Piscataquis	
2	American Woolen Company Foxcroft Mill	American Woolen Company Foxcroft Mill	December 19, 2012 (#12001068)	E. Main St. 45°11′00″N 69°13′50″W	Dover-Foxcroft	
3	Archeological Site No. 121-52a		October 31, 1995 (#95001212)	Address Restricted	Ambajejus Camps	
4	Archeological Site No. 121-52B		October 31, 1995 (#95001213)	Address Restricted	Ambajejus Camps	
5	Archeological Site No. 121-59		October 31, 1995 (#95001214)	Address Restricted	Stephensons Landing	
6	Archeological Site No. 121-71		October 31, 1995 (#95001215)	Address Restricted	Amgajejus Camps	
7	Archeological Site No. 122-4a		October 31, 1995 (#95001202)	Address Restricted	Northeast Piscataquis	
8	Archeological Site No. 133.7		April 25, 1986 (#86000858)	Address Restricted	Chesuncook	
9	Archeological Site No. 133.8		April 25, 1986 (#86000861)	Address Restricted	Chesuncook	
10	Archeological Site No. 142-12		October 31, 1995 (#95001221)	Address Restricted	Ripogenus	
11	Archeological Site No. 142-13		October 31, 1995 (#95001222)	Address Restricted	Ripogenus	
12	Archeological Site No. 142-14		October 31, 1995 (#95001223)	Address Restricted	Ripogenus	
13	Archeological Site No. 142-5		October 31, 1995 (#95001218)	Address Restricted	Ripogenus	
14	Archeological Site No. 142-6		October 31, 1995 (#95001219)	Address Restricted	Ripogenus	
15	Archeological Site No. 142-8		October 31, 1995 (#95001220)	Address Restricted	Ripogenus	
16	Archeological Site No. 143-12		October 31, 1995 (#95001209)	Address Restricted	Ripogenus	
17	Archeological Site No. 143-15		October 31, 1995 (#95001210)	Address Restricted	Ripogenus	
18	Archeological Site No. 143-16		October 31, 1995 (#95001211)	Address Restricted	Ripogenus	
19	Archeological Site No. 143-23		October 31, 1995 (#95001203)	Address Restricted	Chesuncook	
20	Archeological Site No. 143-5		October 31, 1995 (#95001208)	Address Restricted	Ripogenus	
21	Archeological Site No. 143-52		October 31, 1995 (#95001205)	Address Restricted	Chesuncook	
22	Archeological Site No. 143-53		October 31, 1995 (#95001206)	Address Restricted	Chesuncook	
23	Archeological Site No. 143-57		October 31, 1995 (#95001207)	Address Restricted	Chesuncook	
24	Archeological Site No. 143-79		October 31, 1995 (#95001204)	Address Restricted	Chesuncook	
25	Boarding House and Storehouse at Churchill Depot		December 31, 2018 (#100003258)	S of Churchill Dam Rd. 500 ft NE of Chamberlain Dam; 46°29′41″N 69°17′11″W	Churchill Depot	
26	The Breakwater	The Breakwater	April 11, 2002 (#02000349)	Southern tip of Kineo Island on the western side of Kineo Cove; 45°41′16″N 69°43′43″W	Rockwood	
27	Brockway Site (ME 90.3)		July 27, 1987 (#87001152)	Address Restricted	Milo	
28	Brown House		February 14, 1985 (#85000273)	High St. 45°18′20″N 69°02′30″W	Brownville	
29	Burgess House		May 3, 1978 (#78000196)	Burgess Road, east of Austin Road; 45°16′10″N 69°06′53″W	Sebec	
30	Canadian Pacific Railway Depot, Greenville Junction, Maine	Canadian Pacific Railway Depot, Greenville Junction, Maine	March 27, 2017 (#100000809)	0.2 miles north of the junction of Rockwood Road and Pritham Avenue; 45°27′48″N 69°37′22″W	Moosehead Junction Township	
31	Robert Carleton House	Robert Carleton House	December 6, 1975 (#75000108)	N. Main St. 45°09′56″N 69°21′26″W	Sangerville	
32	Chandler-Parsons Blacksmith Shop	Chandler-Parsons Blacksmith Shop	October 16, 1989 (#89001702)	Dawes Rd. 45°12′13″N 69°15′27″W	Dover-Foxcroft	
33	Chesuncook Village	Chesuncook Village	April 11, 1973 (#73000262)	Northwestern shore of Chesuncook Lake; 46°04′N 69°25′W	Chesuncook	
34	Dover-Foxcroft Commercial Historic District	Dover-Foxcroft Commercial Historic District	September 10, 2021 (#100006990)	1-103 East Main St. 45°11′02″N 69°13′45″W	Dover-Foxcroft	
35	First Universalist Church of Sangerville	First Universalist Church of Sangerville	September 20, 2023 (#100009367)	11 Church St. 45°09′58″N 69°21′30″W	Sangerville	
36	Free Will Baptist Church (Former)	Free Will Baptist Church (Former)	October 12, 2000 (#00001205)	Junction of High St. and Highland Ave. 45°15′11″N 68°59′04″W	Milo	Now the local historical society museum
37	Ernest and Louise Genthner House		September 20, 2023 (#100009364)	24 Elm St. 45°10′00″N 69°23′21″W	Guilford	
38	Guilford Memorial Library	Guilford Memorial Library	July 31, 1986 (#86002107)	Library and Water Sts. 45°10′11″N 69°23′01″W	Guilford	
39	Harriman School		June 24, 1996 (#96000653)	Northern side of North Rd., 1.7 miles (2.7 km) northeast of its junction with Parson Landing Rd. 45°14′05″N 69°08′49″W	Sebec	Listed in Dover-Foxcroft vicinity
40	Hathaway Barn	Hathaway Barn	April 22, 2003 (#03000288)	135 Nortons Corner Rd. 45°17′37″N 69°25′24″W	Willimantic	
41	H. Hudson Law Office	H. Hudson Law Office	October 9, 1979 (#79000162)	Hudson Ave. 45°10′01″N 69°23′06″W	Guilford	
42	KATAHDIN (Lake Boat)	KATAHDIN (Lake Boat)	September 13, 1978 (#78003435)	Moosehead Lake; 45°28′09″N 69°37′17″W	Greenville	
43	Katahdin Ironworks	Katahdin Ironworks	December 23, 1969 (#69000011)	Northwest of Brownville Junction at Silver Lake; 45°26′44″N 69°10′26″W	Brownville Junction	
44	Kineo Cottage Row Historic District	Kineo Cottage Row Historic District	January 14, 2004 (#03001408)	Western side of the Kineo Peninsula in Moosehead Lake; 45°41′25″N 69°44′02″W	Kineo Township	
45	Little Schoodic Stream Archeological Site (107-4)		April 20, 1989 (#89000256)	Address Restricted	Medford	
46	Milo Public Library	Milo Public Library	January 5, 1989 (#88003017)	4 Pleasant St. 45°15′45″N 68°59′12″W	Milo	
47	Monson Community Church	Monson Community Church	July 30, 2012 (#12000453)	19 Greenville Rd. 45°17′12″N 69°30′04″W	Monson	
48	Monson Engine House (Former)	Monson Engine House (Former)	August 5, 2005 (#05000798)	6 Tenney Hill Rd. 45°17′10″N 69°30′00″W	Monson	Now a local historical society museum.
49	Munsungan-Chase Lake Thoroughfare Archeological District		September 6, 1979 (#79000163)	Address Restricted	Millinocket Lake	
50	Norton's Corner School	Norton's Corner School	July 14, 2015 (#15000418)	2373 Elliotsville Rd. 45°18′18″N 69°24′35″W	Willimantic	Now houses the Willimantic Library
51	Observer Building	Observer Building	June 26, 1998 (#98000724)	128 Union Sq. 45°11′00″N 69°13′38″W	Dover-Foxcroft	Now a historical society museum.
52	Sangerville Town Hall	Sangerville Town Hall	March 22, 1991 (#91000322)	Main St. 45°09′56″N 69°21′30″W	Sangerville	
53	Sebec-Piscataquis River Confluence Prehistoric Archeological District		December 24, 1986 (#86003482)	Address Restricted; 45°13′59″N 68°57′45″W	Milo	
54	William M. Shaw House	William M. Shaw House	October 16, 2013 (#13000867)	40 Norris St. 45°27′35″N 69°35′12″W	Greenville	Now the Greenville Inn at Moosehead Lake.
55	Slate House		March 10, 1995 (#95000217)	123 Church St. 45°18′52″N 69°01′46″W	Brownville	Destroyed by fire 2019
56	Swedish Lutheran Church	Swedish Lutheran Church	July 19, 1984 (#84001489)	Wilkins and Hebron Sts. 45°17′09″N 69°30′10″W	Monson	
57	Tramway Historic District	Tramway Historic District	May 7, 1979 (#79000164)	Northeast of Greenville; 46°19′10″N 69°22′39″W	Greenville	
58	James Sullivan Wiley House	James Sullivan Wiley House	November 21, 1976 (#76000111)	Main St. 45°11′01″N 69°13′31″W	Dover-Foxcroft	
59	Willard Brook Quarry		September 26, 1986 (#86002182)	Address Restricted	Chesuncook	

== Former listings ==
	Name on the Register	Image	Date listed	Date removed	Location	City or town	Description
1	Walter and Eva Burgess Farm		April 14, 1997 (#97000312)	July 14, 2015	257 Shaw Rd. 45°06′38″N 69°13′40″W	Macomber Corner	Destroyed by fire in 2013.
2	Low's (Lowes) Bridge		February 16, 1972 (#70000062)	May 12, 1987	Over Piscataquis River between Guilford and Sangerville; 45°10′31″N 69°18′54″W	Guilford vicinity	1857 covered bridge, washed away by a flood April 1, 1987; bridge has been rebuilt.
3	Straw House		February 19, 1982 (#82000776)	December 21, 2020	11A Golda Ct. 45°10′13″N 69°23′07″W	Guilford	Recently known as the Trebor Mansion Inn; destroyed by fire in 2019.

== See also ==
- List of National Historic Landmarks in Maine
- National Register of Historic Places listings in Maine
