= Burgess House =

Burgess House may refer to:

- Burgess House (Colorado Springs, Colorado), listed on the National Register of Historic Places in El Paso County, Colorado
- Joseph Fields Burgess House, Sadieville, Kentucky, listed on the National Register of Historic Places in Scott County, Kentucky
- Walter and Eva Burgess Farm, Macomber Corner, Maine, listed on the National Register of Historic Places in Piscataquis County, Maine
- Burgess House (Sebec, Maine), listed on the National Register of Historic Places in Piscataquis County, Maine
- Thornton W. Burgess House, Hampden, Massachusetts, listed on the NRHP in Massachusetts
- Charles H. Burgess House, Quincy, Massachusetts, listed on the NRHP in Massachusetts
- Frank Burgess House, Quincy, Massachusetts, listed on the NRHP in Massachusetts
- Sarchet-Burgess House, Cambridge, Ohio, listed on the National Register of Historic Places in Guernsey County, Ohio
