= Willard Brook Quarry =

- U.S. National Register of Historic Places
- Nearest city: Chesuncook, Maine
- Area: 160 acres (65 ha)
- NRHP reference No.: 86002182
- Added to NRHP: September 26, 1986

The Willard Brook Quarry is a prehistoric stone quarry site in a remote portion of Piscataquis County, Maine. The quarry site is located on one of a series of outcrops near Munsungan Lake in north-central Maine, all of which have yielded stone tools found at prehistoric sites throughout northern New England. The area is known to have been frequented by Native Americans, with an extensive array of habitation sites located in the area between Munsungan and Chase Lake. The Willard Brook quarry site provides evidence that Native Americans engaged in quarrying and mining operations to recover stone suitable for conversion to tools.

The quarry site consists of a series of depressions ringed by debris, which were interpreted by lead investigator Robson Bonnichsen as resulting from native mining operations when analyzed in the 1980s. Archaeological excavation in and around some of these depressions yielded stone blocks, cores, and stone flakes. The stone blocks showed evidence of crushing along their edges, suggesting that leverage was used along natural fissure lines to free them.

The finds of the Willard Quarry site have prompted a reevaluation of the means by which natives gathered stone from the region's stone outcrops. The concentration of lithic materials at this site, when compared with a general lack of such concentration in similar areas along other outcrops suggests that it may have been more common for natives to gather fallen stone, rather than engaging in explicit quarrying and mining activity.

== See also ==
- National Register of Historic Places listings in Piscataquis County, Maine
