= Northwest Piscataquis, Maine =

- Unorganized territory
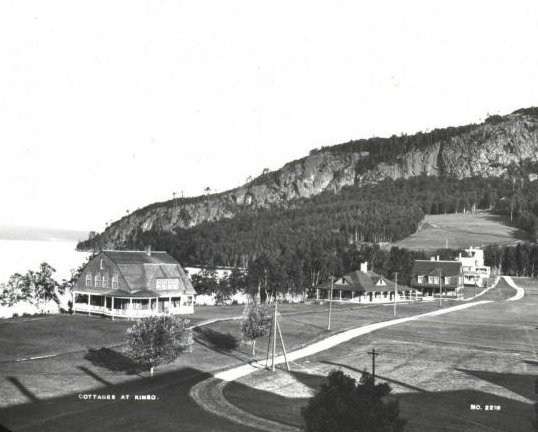
- The Kineo Cottages in the early 1900s.

- Location in Piscataquis County and the state of Maine.
- Coordinates: 46°03′56″N 69°29′28″W
- Country: United States
- State: Maine
- County: Piscataquis

Area
  - Total: 1,632.0 sq mi (4,226.8 km^{2})
  - Land: 1,372.4 sq mi (3,554.5 km^{2})
  - Water: 259.6 sq mi (672.3 km^{2})
- Elevation: 1,096 ft (334 m)

Population (2020)
  - Total: 134
  - Density: 0.0976/sq mi (0.0377/km^{2})
- Time zone: UTC-5 (Eastern (EST))
  - Summer (DST): UTC-4 (EDT)
- ZIP Codes: 04441 (Greenville); 04442 (Greenville Junction); 04478 (Rockwood)
- Area code: 207
- FIPS code: 23-53628
- GNIS feature ID: 582640

Northwest Piscataquis is an unincorporated area in Piscataquis County, Maine, United States. The population was 134 at the 2020 census.

== Geography ==
According to the United States Census Bureau, the unorganized territory has a total area of 1,632.0 square miles (4,226.8 km^{2}), of which 1,372.4 square miles (3,554.5 km^{2}) is land and 259.6 square miles (672.3 km^{2}) (15.91%) is water. Several lakes of the North Maine Woods are located partially or completely in Northwest Piscataquis, including Telos Lake, Moosehead Lake, and Chesuncook Lake. Northwest Piscataquis also contains Big Spencer Mountain and Mount Kineo.

The territory contains 41 townships and parts of ten other townships (shared with Northeast Piscataquis).

== Demographics ==
Historical population
Census	Pop.	Note	%±
1980	99		—
1990	141		42.4%
2000	159		12.8%
2010	147		−7.5%
2020	134		−8.8%
U.S. Decennial Census

As of the census of 2000, there were 159 people, 80 households, and 42 families residing in the unorganized territory. The population density was 0.1 inhabitants per square mile (0.039/km^{2}). There were 982 housing units at an average density of 0.7 per square mile (0.27/km^{2}). The racial makeup of the unorganized territory was 98.11% White, and 1.89% from two or more races.

There were 80 households, out of which 17.5% had children under the age of 18 living with them, 46.3% were married couples living together, 3.8% had a female householder with no husband present, and 47.5% were non-families. 36.3% of all households were made up of individuals, and 13.8% had someone living alone who was 65 years of age or older. The average household size was 1.99 and the average family size was 2.60.

In the unorganized territory the population was spread out, with 17.6% under the age of 18, 4.4% from 18 to 24, 25.2% from 25 to 44, 35.2% from 45 to 64, and 17.6% who were 65 years of age or older. The median age was 47 years. For every 100 females, there were 127.1 males. For every 100 females age 18 and over, there were 129.8 males.

The median income for a household in the unorganized territory was $37,500, and the median income for a family was $53,750. Males had a median income of $26,875 versus $16,875 for females. The per capita income for the unorganized territory was $27,332. None of the families and 8.1% of the population were living below the poverty line, including no under eighteens and 9.4% of those over 64.
