= Slate House =

Slate House may refer to:

- Slate House (Macon, Georgia), listed on the National Register of Historic Places in Bibb County, Georgia
- Slate House (Brownville, Maine), listed on the National Register of Historic Places in Piscataquis County, Maine
- Slate House, County Antrim, a townland in County Antrim, Northern Ireland
