= List of Archeological Sites in Piscataquis County, Maine =

The National Register of Historic Places lists 22 prehistoric archeological sites in Piscataquis County, Maine. Two were listed on the on April 25, 1986, and twenty more were added on October 31, 1995.

== Site No. 121-52a ==
- Archeological Site No. 121-52a
- U.S. National Register of Historic Places
- Nearest city: Ambajejus Camps, Maine
- Area: 0.7 acres (0.28 ha)
- MPS: Penobscot Headwater Lakes Prehistoric Sites MPS
- NRHP reference No.: 95001212
- Added to NRHP: October 31, 1995

Archeological Site No. 121-52a is a historic site in the Ambajejus Camps of Maine containing prehistoric Native American artifacts from the Paleoindian, Late Paleoindian, and Middle Archaic/ Laurentian Tradition, Susquehanna Tradition, and Ceramic Periods. The area was written about by Henry David Thoreau. The site was added to the National Register of Historic Places on October 31, 1995.

== Site No. 121-52B ==
- Archeological Site No. 121-52B
- U.S. National Register of Historic Places
- Nearest city: Ambajejus Camps, Maine
- Area: 0.2 acres (0.081 ha)
- MPS: Penobscot Headwater Lakes Prehistoric Sites MPS
- NRHP reference No.: 95001213
- Added to NRHP: October 31, 1995

Archeological Site No. 121-52B is a historic site in the Ambajejus Camps of Maine containing prehistoric Native American artifacts. The site was added to the National Register of Historic Places on October 31, 1995.

== Site No. 121-59 ==
- Archeological Site No. 121-59
- U.S. National Register of Historic Places
- Nearest city: Stephensons Landing, Maine
- Area: 0.4 acres (0.16 ha)
- MPS: Penobscot Headwater Lakes Prehistoric Sites MPS
- NRHP reference No.: 95001214
- Added to NRHP: October 31, 1995

Archeological Site No. 121–59 are historic sites in Stephensons Landing, Maine and are part of the Penobscot Headwater Lakes Prehistoric Sites. The sites were added to the National Register of Historic Places on October 31, 1995.

== Site No. 121-71 ==
- Archeological Site No. 121-71
- U.S. National Register of Historic Places
- Nearest city: Amgajejus Camps, Maine
- Area: 0.2 acres (0.081 ha)
- MPS: Penobscot Headwater Lakes Prehistoric Sites MPS
- NRHP reference No.: 95001215
- Added to NRHP: October 31, 1995

Archeological Site No. 121-71 is a historic site in the Amgajejus Camps in Maine contained some of the Penobscot Headwater Lakes Prehistoric Sites which contain prehistoric Native American artifacts. The site was added to the National Register of Historic Places on October 31, 1995.

== Site No. 122-4a ==
- Archeological Site No. 122-4a
- U.S. National Register of Historic Places
- Nearest city: Millinocket, Maine
- Area: 0.4 acres (0.16 ha)
- MPS: Penobscot Headwater Lakes Prehistoric Sites MPS
- NRHP reference No.: 95001202
- Added to NRHP: October 31, 1995

Archeological Site No. 122-4a is a historic site near Millinocket, Maine. It is part of the Penobscot Headwater Lakes Prehistoric Sites and was added to the National Register of Historic Places on October 31, 1995.

== Site No. 133.7 ==
- Archeological Site No. 133.7
- U.S. National Register of Historic Places
- Nearest city: Chesuncook, Maine
- Area: 0.1 acres (0.040 ha)
- NRHP reference No.: 86000858
- Added to NRHP: April 25, 1986

Archeological Site No. 133.7 (also known as Archeological Survey Site 133.7) is a historic site near Chesuncook, Maine. It was added to the National Register on April 25, 1986.

== Site No. 133.8 ==
- Archeological Site No. 133.8
- U.S. National Register of Historic Places
- Nearest city: Chesuncook, Maine
- Area: 0.3 acres (0.12 ha)
- NRHP reference No.: 86000861
- Added to NRHP: April 25, 1986

Archeological Site No. 133.8 (also known as Maine Archeological Survey Site 133.8) is a historic site near Chesuncook, Maine. It was added to the National Register on April 25, 1986.

== Site No. 142-5 ==
- Archeological Site No. 142-5
- U.S. National Register of Historic Places
- Nearest city: Ripogenus, Maine
- Area: 0.3 acres (0.12 ha)
- MPS: Penobscot Headwater Lakes Prehistoric Sites MPS
- NRHP reference No.: 95001218
- Added to NRHP: October 31, 1995

Archeological Site No. 142-5 is a historic camp site in Ripogenus, Maine that is part of the Penobscot Headwater Lakes Prehistoric Sites. It was added to the National Register of Historic Places on October 31, 1995.

== Site No. 142-6 ==
- Archeological Site No. 142-6
- U.S. National Register of Historic Places
- Nearest city: Ripogenus, Maine
- Area: 1.4 acres (0.57 ha)
- MPS: Penobscot Headwater Lakes Prehistoric Sites MPS
- NRHP reference No.: 95001219
- Added to NRHP: October 31, 1995

Archeological Site No. 142-6 is a historic camp site in Ripogenus, Maine. It is part of the Penobscot Headwater Lakes Prehistoric Sites and was added to the National Register of Historic Places on October 31, 1995.

== Site No. 142-8 ==
- Archeological Site No. 142-8
- U.S. National Register of Historic Places
- Nearest city: Ripogenus, Maine
- Area: 12 acres (4.9 ha)
- MPS: Penobscot Headwater Lakes Prehistoric Sites MPS
- NRHP reference No.: 95001220
- Added to NRHP: October 31, 1995

Archeological Site No. 142-8 is a historic camp site in Ripogenus, Maine that is part of the Penobscot Headwater Lakes Prehistoric Sites. It was added to the National Register on October 31, 1995.

== Site No. 142-12 ==
- Archeological Site No. 142-12
- U.S. National Register of Historic Places
- Nearest city: Ripogenus, Maine
- Area: 0.4 acres (0.16 ha)
- MPS: Penobscot Headwater Lakes Prehistoric Sites MPS
- NRHP reference No.: 95001221
- Added to NRHP: October 31, 1995

Archeological Site No. 142-12 is a historic site in Ripogenus, Maine. It is part of the Penobscot Headwater Lakes Prehistoric Sites and was added to the National Register on October 31, 1995.

== Site No. 142-13 ==
- Archeological Site No. 142-13
- U.S. National Register of Historic Places
- Nearest city: Ripogenus, Maine
- Area: 2.1 acres (0.85 ha)
- MPS: Penobscot Headwater Lakes Prehistoric Sites MPS
- NRHP reference No.: 95001222
- Added to NRHP: October 31, 1995

Archeological Site No. 142-13 is a prehistoric camp that is part of the Penobscot Headwater Lakes Prehistoric Sites. It is located near Ripogenus, Maine and was added to the National Register on October 31, 1995.

== Site No. 142-14 ==
- Archeological Site No. 142-14
- U.S. National Register of Historic Places
- Nearest city: Ripogenus, Maine
- Area: 1.6 acres (0.65 ha)
- MPS: Penobscot Headwater Lakes Prehistoric Sites MPS
- NRHP reference No.: 95001223
- Added to NRHP: October 31, 1995

Archeological Site No. 142-14 is a historic site and camp in Ripogenus, Maine. It is part of the Penobscot Headwater Lakes Prehistoric Sites and was added to the National Register of Historic Places on October 31, 1995.

== Site No. 143-5 ==
- Archeological Site No. 143-5
- U.S. National Register of Historic Places
- Nearest city: Ripogenus, Maine
- Area: 2 acres (0.81 ha)
- MPS: Penobscot Headwater Lakes Prehistoric Sites MPS
- NRHP reference No.: 95001208
- Added to NRHP: October 31, 1995

Archeological Site No. 143-5 is a historic site in Ripogenus, Maine that is part of the Penobscot Headwater Lakes Prehistoric Sites. It was added to the National Register of Historic Places on October 31, 1995.

== Site No. 143-12 ==
- Archeological Site No. 143-12
- U.S. National Register of Historic Places
- Nearest city: Ripogenus, Maine
- Area: 3.8 acres (1.5 ha)
- MPS: Penobscot Headwater Lakes Prehistoric Sites MPS
- NRHP reference No.: 95001209
- Added to NRHP: October 31, 1995

Archeological Site No. 143-12 is a historic camp site in Ripogenus, Maine. The site is part of the Penobscot Headwater Lakes Prehistoric Sites and was added to the National Register of Historic Places on October 31, 1995.

== Site No. 143-15 ==
- Archeological Site No. 143-15
- U.S. National Register of Historic Places
- Nearest city: Ripogenus, Maine
- Area: 8 acres (3.2 ha)
- MPS: Penobscot Headwater Lakes Prehistoric Sites MPS
- NRHP reference No.: 95001210
- Added to NRHP: October 31, 1995

Archeological Site No. 143-15 is a historic site in Ripogenus, Maine. It is part of the Penobscot Headwater Lakes Prehistoric Sites and was added to the National Register of Historic Places on October 31, 1995.

== Site No. 143-16 ==
- Archeological Site No. 143-16
- U.S. National Register of Historic Places
- Nearest city: Ripogenus, Maine
- Area: 9.8 acres (4.0 ha)
- MPS: Penobscot Headwater Lakes Prehistoric Sites MPS
- NRHP reference No.: 95001211
- Added to NRHP: October 31, 1995

Archeological Site No. 143-16 is a historic camp site that is part of the Penobscot Headwater Lakes Prehistoric Sites. It is located in Ripogenus, Maine and was added to the National Register of Historic Places on October 31, 1995.

== Site No. 143-23 ==
- Archeological Site No. 143-23
- U.S. National Register of Historic Places
- Nearest city: Chesuncook, Maine
- Area: 12 acres (4.9 ha)
- MPS: Penobscot Headwater Lakes Prehistoric Sites MPS
- NRHP reference No.: 95001203
- Added to NRHP: October 31, 1995

Archeological Site No. 143-23 is a historic prehistoric camp site in Chesuncook, Maine that is part of the Penobscot Headwater Lakes Prehistoric Sites. The site was added to the National Register of Historic Places on October 31, 1995.

== Site No. 143-52 ==
- Archeological Site No. 143-52
- U.S. National Register of Historic Places
- Nearest city: Chesuncook, Maine
- Area: less than one acre
- MPS: Penobscot Headwater Lakes Prehistoric Sites MPS
- NRHP reference No.: 95001205
- Added to NRHP: October 31, 1995

Archeological Site No. 143-52 is a historic site in Chesuncook, Maine that is part of the Penobscot Headwater Lakes Prehistoric Sites. It was added to the National Register of Historic Places on October 31, 1995.

== Site No. 143-53 ==
- Archeological Site No. 143-53
- U.S. National Register of Historic Places
- Nearest city: Chesuncook, Maine
- Area: 37 acres (15 ha)
- MPS: Penobscot Headwater Lakes Prehistoric Sites MPS
- NRHP reference No.: 95001206
- Added to NRHP: October 31, 1995

Archeological Site No. 143-53 is a historic site in Chesuncook, Maine that is part of the Penobscot Headwater Lakes Prehistoric Sites. It was added to the National Register of Historic Places on October 31, 1995.

== Site No. 143-57 ==
- Archeological Site No. 143-57
- U.S. National Register of Historic Places
- Nearest city: Chesuncook, Maine
- Area: 0.4 acres (0.16 ha)
- MPS: Penobscot Headwater Lakes Prehistoric Sites MPS
- NRHP reference No.: 95001207
- Added to NRHP: October 31, 1995

Archeological Site No. 143-57 is a historic site in Chesuncook, Maine that is part of the Penobscot Headwater Lakes Prehistoric Sites. It was added to the National Register on October 31, 1995.

== Site No. 143-79 ==
- Archeological Site No. 143-79
- U.S. National Register of Historic Places
- Nearest city: Chesuncook, Maine
- Area: 3 acres (1.2 ha)
- MPS: Penobscot Headwater Lakes Prehistoric Sites MPS
- NRHP reference No.: 95001204
- Added to NRHP: October 31, 1995

Archeological Site No. 143–79 is a historic site in Chesuncook, Maine that is part of the Penobscot Headwater Lakes Prehistoric Sites. It was added to the National Register on October 31, 1995.
