= Kineo Cottage Row Historic District =

Historic district in Maine, United States

- U.S. National Register of Historic Places
- U.S. Historic district
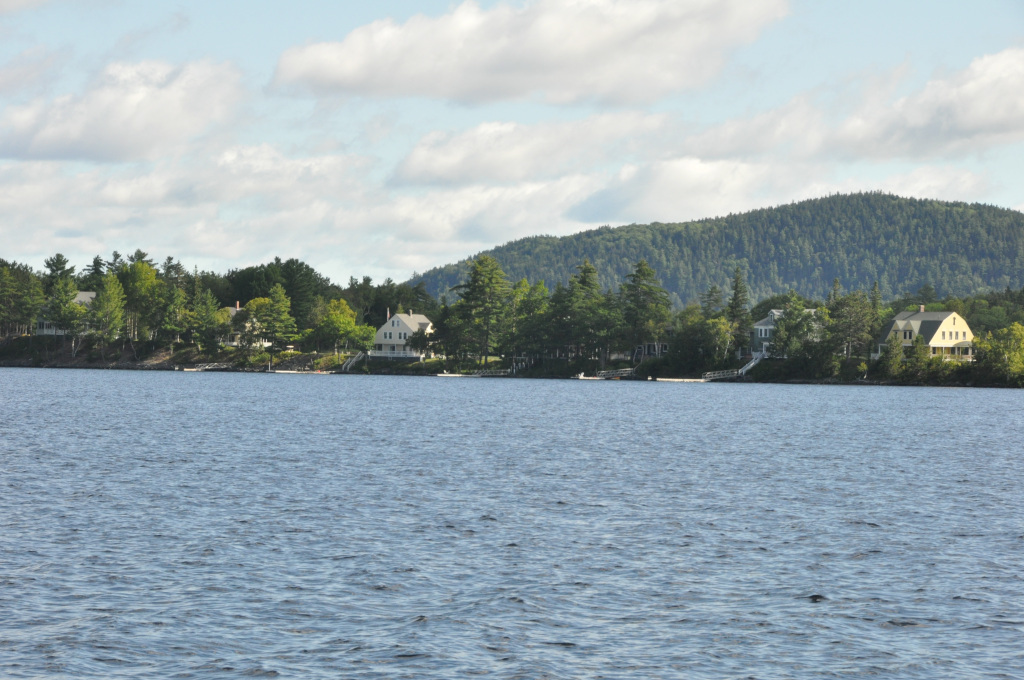

- Location within Maine Location within the United States
- Location: West side of Kineo peninsula in Moosehead Lake, Kineo Township, Maine
- Coordinates: 45°41′25″N 69°44′2″W
- Area: 2.1 acres (0.85 ha)
- Built: 1912
- Architect: Coombs and Gibbs
- Architectural style: Shingle Style, Queen Anne, et al.
- NRHP reference No.: 03001408
- Added to NRHP: January 14, 2004

The Kineo Cottage Row Historic District encompasses a collection of seven summer resort cottages on the Mount Kineo peninsula, which juts into Moosehead Lake in central Maine. The cottages were built between 1900 and 1912 as part of the Mount Kineo resort complex, one of interior Maine's most successful summer resorts of the early 20th century; the cottages and the golf course are the only major surviving components. The cottages were listed on the National Register of Historic Places in 2004.

== Setting and history ==
Moosehead Lake is the largest lake in New England, stretching north for 40 miles (64 km) from Greenville, Maine. About halfway up the lake stands Mount Kineo, which stands on a peninsula jutting west into the lake and rises 800 feet (240 m) above it. A flat neck of land extends southward from the mountain, on which the Mount Kineo Resort was developed beginning in the 1880s. The resort included a large hotel (which burned down in the 1930s) built in 1884, a golf course, and the nearby Breakwater sporting lodge. In 1901 the resort management embarked on a campaign to build new "cottages" for lease to wealthy clients, hiring the architectural firm of Coombs and Gibbs for the purpose. The cottages were part of the resort's heyday years between 1910 and the 1930s, and of a revival period between 1947 and 1970. They were part of efforts later in the 20th century to restart the resort on a smaller scale. The seven cottages were sold entirely into private hands as part of a condominium association in 1989.

The cottages are situated in a row on the western shore of the peninsula. They all share architectural characteristics with each other, and with the main hotel building. Predominantly Shingle style in design, these buildings included corner towers typical of the Queen Anne style, hanging bay windows over concave shingled bases, and leaded glass windows. All have expansive verandas, and have a main entrance facing south, toward where the hotel stood. Most of the cottages share basic floor plan and layout with at least one other in the group, to the point where the Birch Cottage is a near duplicate of Fir Cottage. They are described below in order, from north to south, using names given to them in 1970, when the cottage property was subdivided from the rest of the resort.

=== Fir Cottage ===
Fir Cottage was built in 1901, and its design is unambiguously attributable to Coombs and Gibbs. Because of its position at the far north of the row on a sloping lot, it stands higher than the other cottages.

=== Elm Cottage ===
Elm Cottage was built in 1905 and altered in 1912. Originally L-shaped in plan, its tower was added in 1912, and the crook of the L was enclosed. Unlike most of the other cottages, it is predominantly finished in clapboards instead of shingles.

=== Dogwood Cottage ===
Dogwood Cottage, built sometime between 1901 and 1904, is essentially Dutch Colonial Revival in design, with a shingled exterior and Shingle style details. It has an engaged porch (giving the second floor more square footage), with turned posts and balusters in the Queen Anne style.

=== Cedar Cottage ===
Cedar Cottage is similar in its exterior styling to Dogwood, as a Dutch Colonial with Shingle features, with an interior layout that is nearly identical to that of Fir Cottage. It may have been designed by Coombs and Gibbs, or merely been an built on altered plans.

=== Oak Lodge ===
Oak Lodge, built in 1912 on the site of a former sporting clubhouse, was the last of the seven to be built, and is the only one designed as a duplex. Built at the same that an annex was built onto the main hotel, it has a distinct Craftsman flavor to its design, with ribbon windows and exposed rafter tails. The building's two units are mirror images, and have been at times combined into a single unit.

=== Birch Cottage ===
Built between 1905 and 1907, this building is a near replica of Fir Cottage, differing only in some details on the tower. Its interior has been altered to expose the interior truss system from which its second floor is suspended, enabling it to have a large living room without posts.

=== Alpen Cottage ===
Alpen Cottage was built in 1904, and may also be a Coombs and Gibbs design. It has a gambrel roof, and its porch is partially exterior and partially engaged, with Tuscan columns supporting the overhanging second story on that portion.

== See also ==
- National Register of Historic Places listings in Piscataquis County, Maine
