= Hathaway Barn =

- U.S. National Register of Historic Places
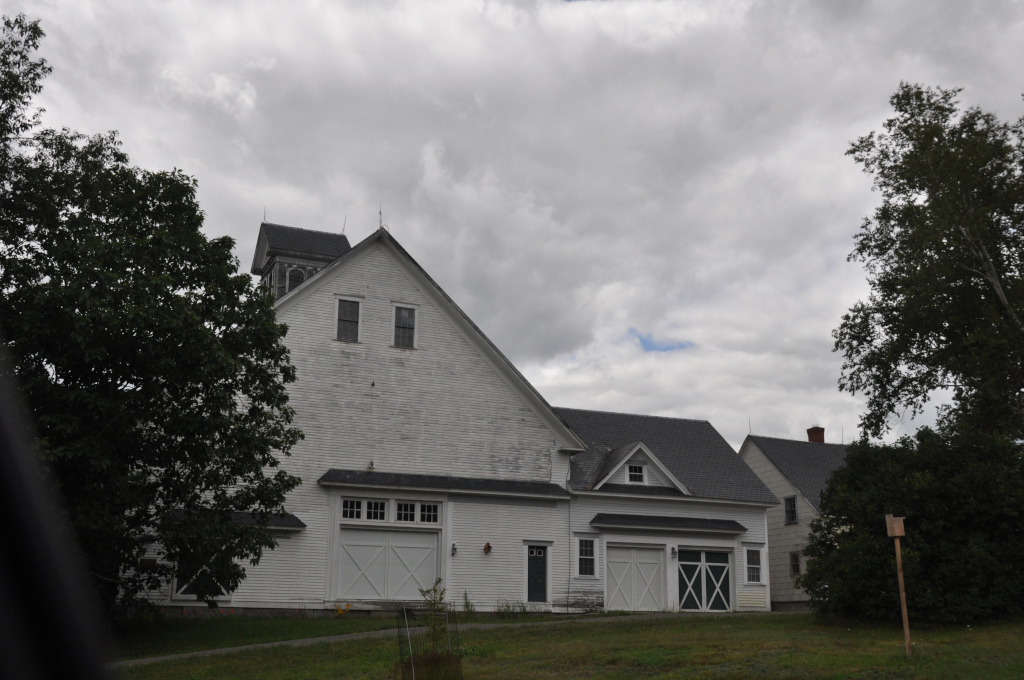

- Location within Maine Location within the United States
- Location: 135 Nortons Corner Rd., Willimantic, Maine
- Coordinates: 45°17′37″N 69°25′24″W
- Area: less than one acre
- Built: 1880
- Architectural style: Greek Revival, Italianate
- NRHP reference No.: 03000288
- Added to NRHP: April 22, 2003

The Hathaway Barn is a historic barn at 135 Nortons Corner Road in Willimantic, Maine, a rural community in southern Piscataquis County. Built c. 1880 by Jabez Hathaway, this large barn was an optimistic expression of the future prospects of the dairy industry in the area, which were ultimately not borne out. The barn is part of a farmstead complex whose other elements have not maintained historical integrity; it was listed on the National Register of Historic Places in 2003.

== Description and history ==
The Hathaway Barn is a bank barn, set on the west side of Nortons Corner Road, as part of a farmstead located just north of Hathaway Brook. The main house, a typical rural New England connected farmhouse, was built c. 1857 by Jabez Hathaway, who established a 140-acre (57 ha) farm. The farmhouse, along with its ell and small barn, has been significantly modified, including conversion into two apartments, and no longer has historical integrity. The large barn is estimated, based on construction techniques and materials, to date to about 1880, and was apparently built by Hathaway in anticipation of increased demand for dairy products, occasioned by a boom demand for cheese and butter in Maine markets in the 1870s. The barn is similar in plan to one built at the University of Maine at Orono in 1873 (no longer extant), and was apparently promoted by the state as an ideal dairy barn.

The barn is an 80 by 55 feet (24 m × 17 m) timber frame structure, set on a high granite foundation, and faces roughly northeast. A retaining wall on the east side further supports the barn as the ground drops away to the south, providing ground-level access to the basement. The building is at the northwest to a carriage barn, whose gable runs perpendicular to that of the barn, and with their facades roughly flush. This extended facade has three sliding barn door entrances and one personnel entry. At the rear there is a hinged door providing access to the basement; a ramp that once provided access to the main floor has been removed. The gabled roof is metal, topped by a square gable-roofed cupola. The building is framed with large timbers fastened by pegs, and smaller structural elements are fastened with wire nails, a clue to the building's construction date. The framing method is also similar to local innovations in the 1880 construction of a mill complex to provide larger open spaces inside the structure.

== See also ==
- National Register of Historic Places listings in Piscataquis County, Maine
