= The Breakwater =

- U.S. National Register of Historic Places
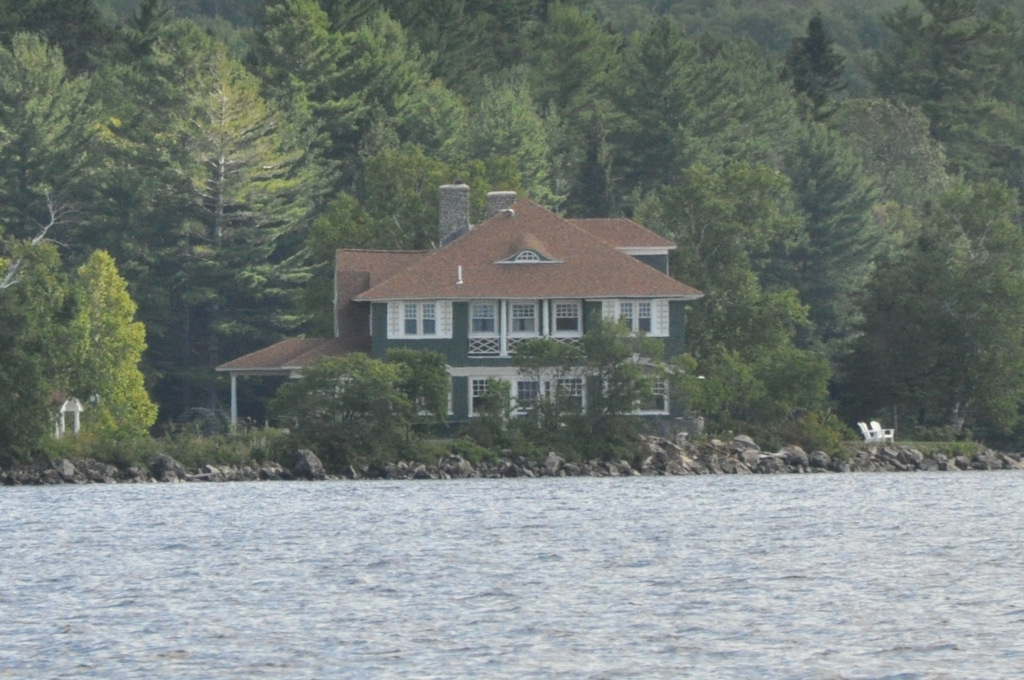

- Location within Maine Location within the United States
- Nearest city: Rockwood, Maine
- Coordinates: 45°41′16″N 69°43′43″W
- Area: 0.8 acres (0.32 ha)
- Architect: Chamberlin, Howard G.
- Architectural style: Renaissance Revival, Shingle style
- NRHP reference No.: 02000349
- Added to NRHP: April 11, 2002

The Breakwater is a historic sporting lodge on the Mount Kineo peninsula of Moosehead Lake in central Maine. Built in 1909, it is an architecturally sophisticated example of a sporting lodge, exhibiting Shingle style and Italianate features. It was designed by Howard G. Chamberlain, a New York City architect, with funding from the nearby Mount Kineo Resort and the Moosehead Yacht Club. It was one of the centerpieces of central Maine's most successful summer resort, and was listed on the National Register of Historic Places in 2002.

== Description and history ==
The Breakwater is a two-story wood-frame structure, set at the southern end of the narrow peninsula projecting south from Mount Kineo into Moosehead Lake, Maine's largest lake. The main block is set on stone piers and topped by a shingled hip roof, with a side ell of 1 1/2 stories that is gambrel-roofed. The primary facade faces the lake to the south, with a two-story recessed porch at its center, and flanking multiwindow bays on either side. A beltcourse of trim separates the first and second floors, rising in gentle keystoned arches above the windows of the side bays. A hip-roof dormer pierces the roof above the porches. The western facade is somewhat similar in appearance; the first-floor porch has been glassed in, and there is an eyebrow dormer above the porches. Windows on the first floor are twelve-over-one on the first floor and six-over-one on the second. The porch balustrades are diamond-shaped woodwork.

The interior of the lodge has a fairly open plan of rooms, with service areas largely confined to the ell. There is a large central living room area, with dining rooms on either side. The upstairs has been arranged for residential use, with bedrooms and bathrooms.

The Breakwater was designed by New York architect Howard G. Chamberlain and built in 1909. Construction was overseen by the adjacent Mount Kineo Resort, with some funding coming from the Moosehead Yacht Club, one of the leading social organizations in the lake-oriented community. The resort was successful until the Great Depression, and its main hotel was torn down in 1938, leaving an annex, a collection of residential cottages, and The Breakwater, which were consolidated under one ownership in 1946. Later attempts to resurrect the resort failed, and the hotel annex was also torn down, in 1995. The Yacht Club was revived in 1962, but is now located in Greenville. The Breakwater sat vacant for many years, but underwent restoration in 1999.

== See also ==
- National Register of Historic Places listings in Piscataquis County, Maine
