= Harriman School =

- U.S. National Register of Historic Places
- Location within Maine Location within the United States
- Nearest city: Sebec, Maine
- Coordinates: 45°14′5″N 69°8′49″W
- Area: less than one acre
- Built: 1860
- Architectural style: Greek Revival
- NRHP reference No.: 96000653
- Added to NRHP: June 24, 1996

The Harriman School is a historic one-room schoolhouse on North Road in rural Sebec, Maine. Built in 1860, it is the oldest of two surviving 19th-century district schoolhouses in the community. The vernacular Greek Revival building served as a public school until 1933, and was converted into a museum by the Sebec Historical Society after it acquired the property in 1966. The building was listed on the National Register of Historic Places in 1996.

== Description and history ==
The Harriman School is set facing south on the north side of North Road, about 1.7 miles (2.7 km) northeast of its junction with Parsons Landing Road. It is a rectangular wood-frame structure with a front-facing gable roof, weatherboard exterior, and a granite foundation. The front facade is three bays wide, with a single window in the center bay, flanked by a pair of matching entries, with a single sash window in the gable end above. The entries have modest surrounds with transoms and pedimented lintels. The interior is finished in tongue-and-groove woodwork (added in the 20th century), and includes original furnishings such as student desks, a raised teacher's platform, and a slate blackboard.

The building was, according to local lore, originally built to house a church, but this is not confirmed in any documentation. It was built about 1860, and was one of the town's sixteen district schoolhouses. Population decline in the 19th century quickly reduced the number of district schools to nine, and the school system was consolidated in 1933, closing the remaining district schools. This building sat vacant until 1947, when it was rehabilitated and used for a time as a community center. It was acquired in 1966 by the Sebec Historical Society, which uses it as a museum.

== See also ==
- National Register of Historic Places listings in Piscataquis County, Maine
