= Norton's Corner School =

- U.S. National Register of Historic Places
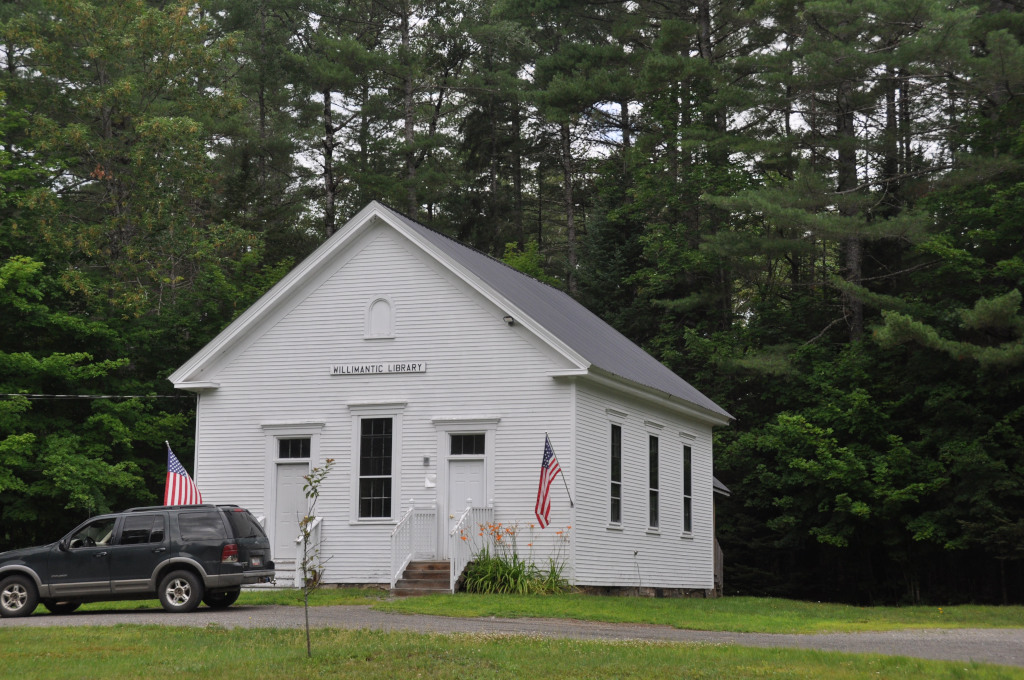

- Location within Maine Location within the United States
- Location: 2373 Elliotsville Rd., Willimantic, Maine
- Coordinates: 45°18′18″N 69°24′35″W
- Area: less than one acre
- Built: 1882
- Architectural style: Late Victorian
- NRHP reference No.: 15000418
- Added to NRHP: July 14, 2015

The Norton's Corner School is a historic one-room schoolhouse at 2373 Elliotsville Road in Willimantic, Maine. Built about 1882, it was one of the small town's first public buildings, a role it continues to serve as it now houses the public library. The building was listed on the National Register of Historic Places in 1996.

== Description and history ==
The Norton's Corner School is set on the west side of Elliotsville Road in the rural village center of Willimantic, a small town with a population of about 150. It is set back, with a grassy area and semicircular drive between it and the road. It is a single-story wood-frame structure, with a front-facing gabled metal roof and clapboard siding. The front facade has a pair of entrances flanking a central sash window, and the side walls each have three sash windows. The interior has two small entry vestibules, with a large open space occupying most of the building. The walls are finished in bead-board wainscoting and plaster, and the floors are fir. The north and south walls retain original blackboards.

The school was built sometime between 1881, when a town meeting authorized the division of the town into school districts, and 1884, when it voted to acquire the land on which the constructed building stood. It was probably the second school built in the town, as mention is made in the 1881 meeting minutes of another school. That school, the Hart's Corner School, is in poor condition and has been substantially altered. Alterations to this building include a woodshed and privies, which were added in 1916 and 1926, and the building was electrified by 1951. The school was used for educational purposes until 1965, when it was the last of the town's schools to close (the town's students are now sent to schools consolidated with other area communities). In 1976 a local civic group outfitted the building with library shelving, and opened it in the summertime as a public library.

== See also ==
- National Register of Historic Places listings in Piscataquis County, Maine
