= Swedish Lutheran Church =

Swedish Lutheran Church may refer to:

- Church of Sweden
- Swedish Lutheran Church (Monson, Maine)
- Swedish Lutheran Church of Strandburg
