= Straw House =

Historic house in Maine, United States

- Formerly listed on the U.S. National Register of Historic Places
- Location within Maine Location within the United States
- Location: Golda Ct., Guilford, Maine
- Coordinates: 45°10′13″N 69°23′7″W
- Area: 0.5 acres (0.20 ha)
- Built: 1832
- Architectural style: Queen Anne
- NRHP reference No.: 82000776

Significant dates
- Added to NRHP: February 19, 1982
- Removed from NRHP: December 21, 2020

The Straw House was a historic house, most recently a bed and breakfast inn called the Trebor Mansion Inn, at 11A Golda Court in Guilford, Maine. The elegant Queen Anne Victorian was built c. 1832, and extensively altered in the 1880s by David Straw to achieve its present appearance. An electrical fire in 2004 did extensive damage to the building, but it was largely restored to its 1880s appearance. Its walls featured artwork by the itinerant 19th-century artist Moses Eaton. The house was listed on the National Register of Historic Places in 1982. It was destroyed by fire in 2019, and was delisted in 2020.

== Description and history ==
The Straw House was located at a bend in Golda Court, a residential side street in the main village of Guilford, Maine. It was a 2 1/2-story wood-frame structure, with a gabled slate roof, wraparound single-story porch, and three story octagonal tower with a conical slate roof. The walls were finished in a variety of materials including clapboards, decorative cut shingles, and half-timbering.

The house was built c. 1830 by John Monroe, and was purchased in 1832 by David Straw, a lawyer who, along with his son David Jr., established one of Maine's first textile mills in 1865. Around 1836 Straw commissioned the itinerant artist Moses Eaton to add stenciled artwork to some of its walls. The building was greatly enlarged in 1894, at which time it acquired its Victorian features, including the tower. In 1976 the property was opened as the Trebor Mansion Inn. The house was damaged by a lightning-struck tree in 1991, and was virtually gutted by an electrically started fired on January 24, 2004. The restoration of the property to its original condition included fabrication of custom windows, and sourcing of slate for the roof from the same quarry that had provided the original. The Eaton stencilwork was discovered during restoration, and was conserved with assistance from the Maine Historical Society. The building was completely destroyed by a five-alarm fire on July 20, 2019.

== See also ==
- National Register of Historic Places listings in Piscataquis County, Maine
