= Brown House (Brownville, Maine) =

Historic house in Maine, United States

- U.S. National Register of Historic Places
- Location within Maine Location within the United States
- Location: High St., Brownville, Maine, United States
- Coordinates: 45°18′20″N 69°2′30″W
- Area: 0.5 acres (0.20 ha)
- Built: 1815
- Built by: Francis Brown
- NRHP reference No.: 85000273
- Added to NRHP: February 14, 1985

The Brown House is a historic house on High Street in Brownville, Maine, United States. This two-story wood-frame house was built in 1815 by Francis Brown, for whom the town is named. It is architecturally distinctive for a period suspended ceiling on the second floor. The house was listed on the National Register of Historic Places in 1985.

== Description and history ==
The Brown House is a 2 1/2-story wood-frame structure, five bays wide, with a side-gable roof and two interior chimneys, on the north side of High Street, a short way west of Main Street. It is clad in weatherboard and rests on a granite foundation. An ell extends to the rear of the house, connecting it to a perpendicularly-oriented single-story carriage barn. The main entrance, centered on the south-facing facade, has a Federal-style pilastered surround, with sidelight windows and a transom window. Its windows have simple molded architrave trim. The most distinctive architectural feature of the building is the second-floor ceiling, which consists of plaster and lath fixed to 2x4 members which are themselves attached to a network of massive hewn 4x4 and 10x10 timber elements. The ceiling is thus not supported at all by the walls.

The town of Brownville has its origins in the early 19th-century purchase of a large tract of land by Massachusetts native Moses Brown, who in 1815 sent his son Francis to build a lumber mill and develop the area. Over the course of twelve years Francis built this house, bringing in hardware from Boston, foundation stones from quarries on the Maine coast, and clay for the chimney bricks from Charleston, some 30 miles (48 km) away. When finished it was by far the grandest house in the town.

== See also ==
- National Register of Historic Places listings in Piscataquis County, Maine
