= Brockway Site =

- Brockway Site (ME 90.3)
- U.S. National Register of Historic Places
- Nearest city: Milo, Maine
- Area: 6.2 acres (2.5 ha)
- NRHP reference No.: 87001152
- Added to NRHP: July 27, 1987

The Brockway Site, designated Site 90.3 by the Maine Archaeological Survey, is a prehistoric archaeological site in Milo, Maine. Long known to local amateur archaeologists, the site was formally tested in 1986, yielding evidence of a well-stratified site containing thousands of artifacts dating as far back as c. 2000 BCE. These types of sites are rare in the interior of Maine. The site was listed on the National Register of Historic Places in 1987.

== Description ==
The Brockway Site is located in the watershed of the Sebec River in southern Milo, an area that was previously known to be rich in archaeological sites. The site is one that has seen regular agricultural use, and both the landowner and amateur archaeologists had made surface-level finds of artifacts before the site was formally examined by a team from the University of Maine in 1986.

The 1986 work determined the size of the site to be at least 215 by 165 metres (705 ft × 541 ft) in size, although there is reason to suspect it was once somewhat larger. Seven layers of strata were identified, including bedrock at the lowest level and the agricultural plowzone at the top. Large number of stone flakes (debitage) related to the manufacture of stone tools were recovered, as were sixteen tools. The tools were manufactured from a variety of stone, predominantly rhyolite and chert, that were not local to the area. Fragments of pottery were also recovered, and one hearth-like feature was identified, whose charcoal fragments yielded radiocarbon dates of c. 1790 BCE. This, combined with the presence of red ochre, places the feature within the Moorehead Phase, more commonly referred to as the Red Paint People.

The site has also yielded a significant number of artifacts from the colonial period, including tobacco pipes of a style typical of the 1720s, and hand-cut nails. These artifacts were widespread within the plowzone, and are not as significant to the site's importance as its well-stratified nature. It is expected that further research on the site will yield information on settlement patterns and religious practices of the inhabitants.

== See also ==
- National Register of Historic Places listings in Piscataquis County, Maine
