= Robert Carleton House =

Historic house in Maine, United States

- U.S. National Register of Historic Places
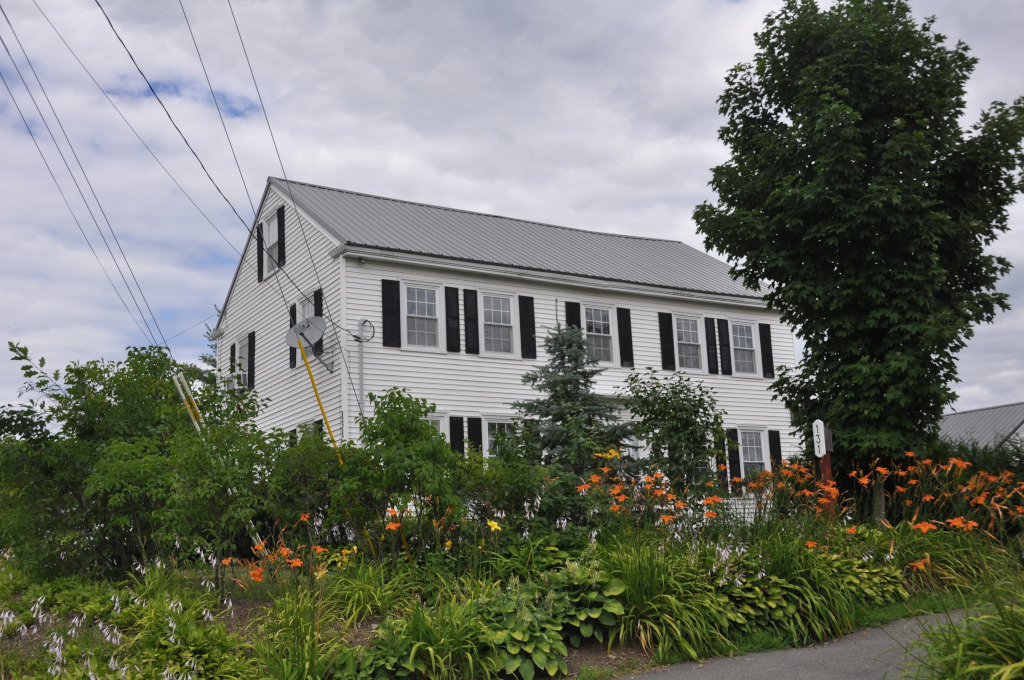

- Location within Maine Location within the United States
- Location: N. Main St., Sangerville, Maine
- Coordinates: 45°9′56″N 69°21′26″W
- Area: 1 acre (0.40 ha)
- Built: 1819
- Architectural style: Federal
- NRHP reference No.: 75000108
- Added to NRHP: December 6, 1975

The Robert Carleton House is a historic house on North Main Street in Sangerville, Maine. Built c. 1819, it is one of the oldest surviving buildings in Piscataquis County. The 2 1/2-story wood-frame structure, with vernacular Federal style, was built by Robert Carleton on land purchased from his brother, a worker in the nearby fulling mill. It was listed on the National Register of Historic Places in 1975.

== Description and history ==
The Carleton House is a 2 1/2-story wood-frame structure, with a gable roof, two interior chimneys near the side walls, and a granite foundation. The main facade, facing south, is five bays wide, with a central entry that has flanking sidelight windows, and a Federal-style surround that has pilasters supported in an entablature with cornice. The windows are uniformly 12-over-12 sash. A single-story ell, probably an early addition, extends to the north. The interior has a central hall plan, with two rooms on each side of the hall on both floors. These rooms have original Federal period woodwork, including fireplace mantels, wainscoting, trim, and doors.

The town of Sangerville was first settled c. 1801–02, and Thomas Prince, one of the early arrivals, established a fulling mill on what is now called Carleton Stream, which empties into the nearby Piscataquis River. One of Prince's workers, Guy Carleton, purchased the land on which this house stands in 1818. The following year he sold it to his brother Robert, who built the house. Robert was a prominent member of the local militia, seeing some heightened activity during the border dispute with neighboring New Brunswick known as the Aroostook War. Guy Carleton established his own mill, which survived as a business into the 20th century.

== See also ==
- National Register of Historic Places listings in Piscataquis County, Maine
