= Sangerville Town Hall =

- U.S. National Register of Historic Places
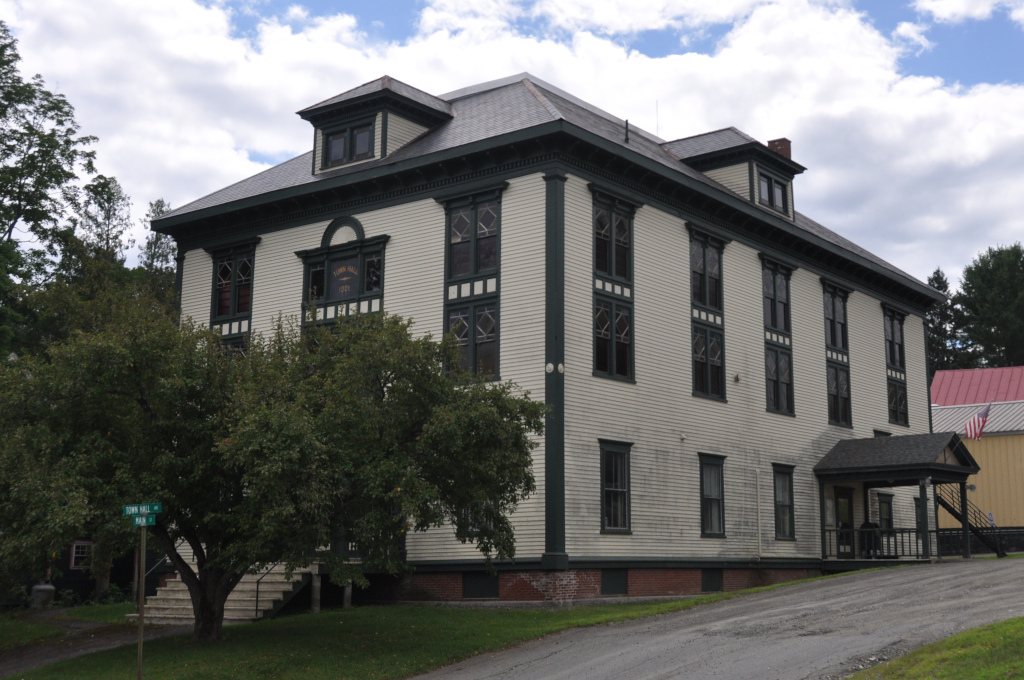

- Location within Maine Location within the United States
- Location: Main St., Sangerville, Maine
- Coordinates: 45°9′56″N 69°21′30″W
- Area: less than one acre
- Built: 1902
- Architect: Smith, C. L.
- Architectural style: Colonial Revival
- NRHP reference No.: 91000322
- Added to NRHP: March 22, 1991

Sangerville Town Hall is located at 1 Town Hall Lane (corner of South Main Street) in the village center of Sangerville, Maine. Built in 1902, it is one of the rural community's most sophisticated architectural buildings. It was designed and built by a local contractor, and has well-proportioned Colonial Revival features. It was listed on the National Register of Historic Places in 1991.

== Description and history ==
Sangerville Town Hall is set facing east on the west side of South Main Street (Maine State Route 23) in Sangerville's village center, a short way south of the Piscataquis River. It is a large 2-1/2 story wood frame structure, with a dormered slate hip roof, weatherboard siding, and a granite foundation. Its main facade is three bays wide, with the center entrance sheltered by a portico that is supported by thin square posts and features an elaborately decorated entablature. The entry itself consists of a double door set in a wide arch, flanked by arched Queen Anne-style windows with colored panes. Above the entry on the second level are a grouping of three sash windows, with a Palladian window at the third level. The side bays have single sash windows at the ground level and doubled sash windows above, joined between levels by a paneled course. The north elevation repeats the window patterns of the flanking bays, with a side entrance occupying the fourth bay (of five), which faces the parking lot. The south elevation repeats the window plan of the upper levels of the north side, but has two entrances on the ground level, flanked by either single or paired sash windows. The rear of the building originally housed a wide entrance for fire equipment; this has been closed off.

The interior houses municipal offices and the library on the ground floor, and a large performance space on the upper levels, which include a third-floor gallery level. The rear of the building was built to house a fire truck and hearse; the library later expanded into this space.

The building was designed and built in 1901-02 by C. L. Smith, a local contractor about whom little is known. It was built during a period of prosperity brought about by the construction of several woolen mills in the town, and is one of several buildings of architectural sophistication built in the town during that period.

== See also ==
- National Register of Historic Places listings in Piscataquis County, Maine
