= Sebec-Piscataquis River Confluence Prehistoric Archeological District =

Historic district in Maine, United States

- U.S. National Register of Historic Places
- U.S. Historic district
- Nearest city: Milo, Maine
- Area: 42 acres (17 ha)
- NRHP reference No.: 86003482
- Added to NRHP: December 24, 1986

The Sebec-Piscataquis River Confluence Prehistoric Archeological District encompasses a collection of important prehistoric archaeological sites in Milo, Maine. Located near the mouth of the Sebec River where it meets the Piscataquis River, these sites include several deeply stratified sites covering 5,000 years of history dating back to 8,300 BCE. The area was listed on the National Register of Historic Places in 1986.

== Description ==
Milo is located in central Maine, about 85 miles (137 km) north of the coast. The Sebec River flows roughly south through the town, meeting the Piscataquis near its southern border. The Piscataquis River flows east, joining the Penobscot River at Howland. The area lies at the junction of the coastal lowlands and the more mountainous upland areas to the north. The confluence of the two rivers is an area that has seen regular sedimentary deposits along its banks.

The area was first briefly surveyed by the pioneering archaeologist Warren K. Moorehead in the 1920s, and was probably also studied by amateur archaeologists in the 1930s. An amateur affiliated with the Maine Archaeological Society performed a test excavation in 1982, which exposed the deeply-stratified nature of the site and yielded date of c. 8300 BCE in the lowest layer that had datable cultural materials. These findings prompted professional investigation in subsequent years under the general auspices of a program to survey the entire Piscataquis rivershed for archaeological sites. This later work identified additional sites in the area.

The stratifications of these sites show layers of deposited sediment, with evidence of hearths in between. Along with the fire-cracked stone of the hearths, stone tools, bone fragments, and ceramic remains were found. The Brigham Site, the most intensively investigated, had six separate layers of datable cultural materials, the youngest at c. 1100 CE, and the oldest at c. 8300 BCE. The most common identifiable animal remains were of beaver.

== See also ==
- National Register of Historic Places listings in Piscataquis County, Maine
