= Monson Community Church =

Historic church in Maine, United States

- U.S. National Register of Historic Places
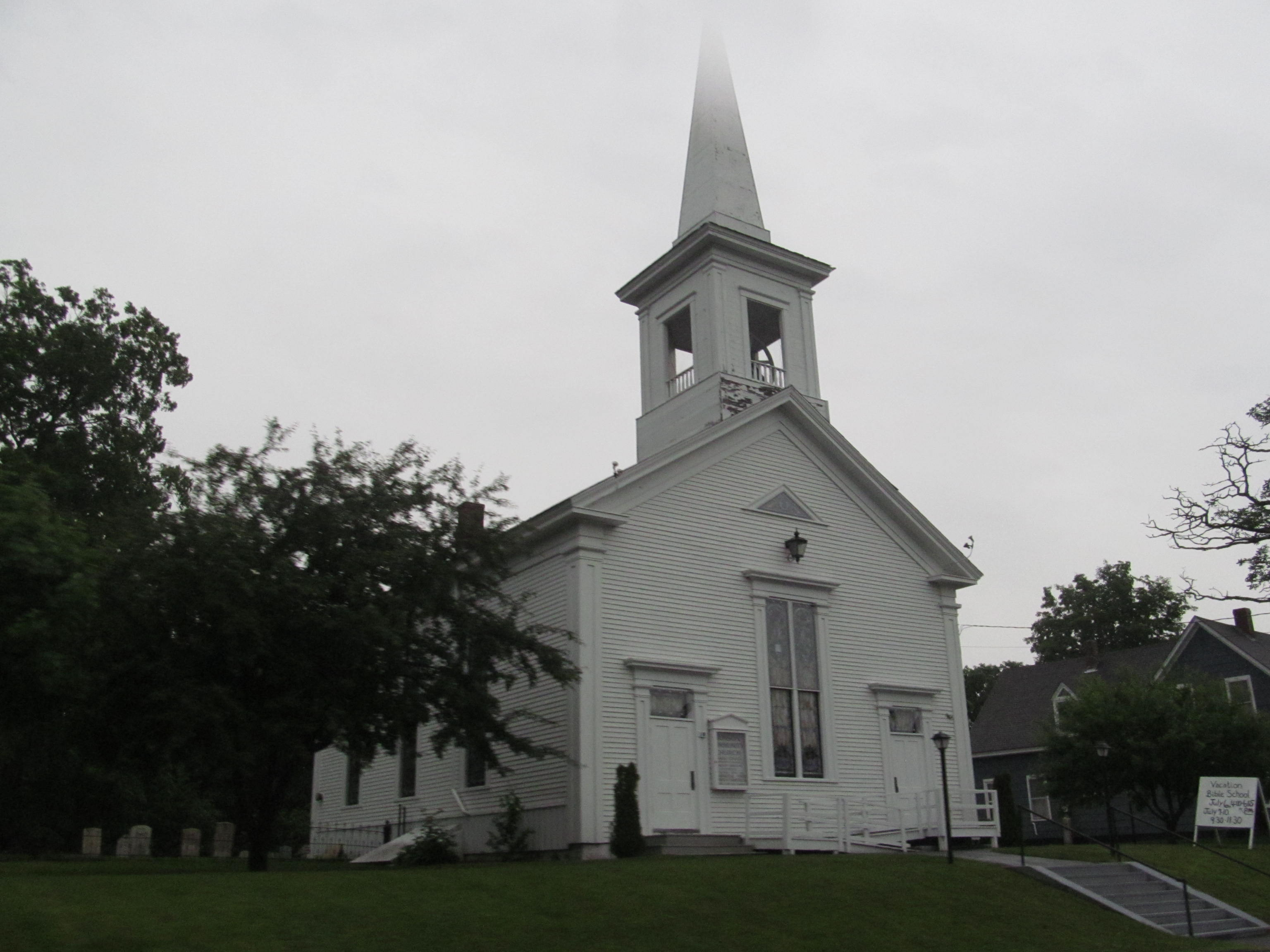

- Location within Maine Location within the United States
- Location: 19 Greenville Rd., Monson, Maine
- Coordinates: 45°17′14″N 69°30′5″W
- Area: less than one acre
- Built: 1861
- NRHP reference No.: 12000453
- Added to NRHP: July 30, 2012

The Monson Community Church is a Christian congregation affiliated with the Evangelical Free Church of America. It is located in a historically and architecturally significant church building at 19 Greenville Road in Monson, Maine. Its building is a combination of two separate sanctuaries, one built in 1845 for a Baptist congregation, and the other in 1861 for Congregationalists, that were joined in 1959 when the two congregations merged. The building was listed on the National Register of Historic Places in 2000, representing a unique adaptive reuse of 19th-century church buildings.

== Description and history ==
The Monson Community Church is set on the northeast side of Greenville Road (a.k.a. Main Street, Maine State Route 6) in the central village of Monson. Located closer to the street is the 1861 Congregational church building, to which the 1845 Baptist church building has been attached at the northeast corner. The Congregational church building is two stories in height, and has been adapted to house church offices, meeting spaces, and Sunday School facilities. The Baptist church, originally located on Pleasant Street, was moved to its present location in 1959. Both buildings are finished in clapboard siding, and have Greek Revival features such as corner pilasters and fully pedimented gable ends. The Congregational church has a two-stage tower with an open belfry; the tower of the Baptist church was removed when the building was moved.

The town of Monson was settled 1815–20, and incorporated in 1822. Its Congregational congregation was established in 1821, and built its first building (said to be the first between Bangor and the northern Canada–US border) in 1831. That church burned in 1860, after which the congregation promptly rebuilt. The Baptist congregation was established in 1827, but did not build a church until 1845. Both congregations remained healthy until the 1940s, when their populations dwindled. Merger discussions were underway by 1955, and the building move was executed in 1959. The Monson Community Church was not formally incorporated as a separated entity until 1982; the Congregational Society was disbanded in 1986, and the Baptist Society in 1996.

== See also ==
- National Register of Historic Places listings in Piscataquis County, Maine
