= Observer Building =

- U.S. National Register of Historic Places
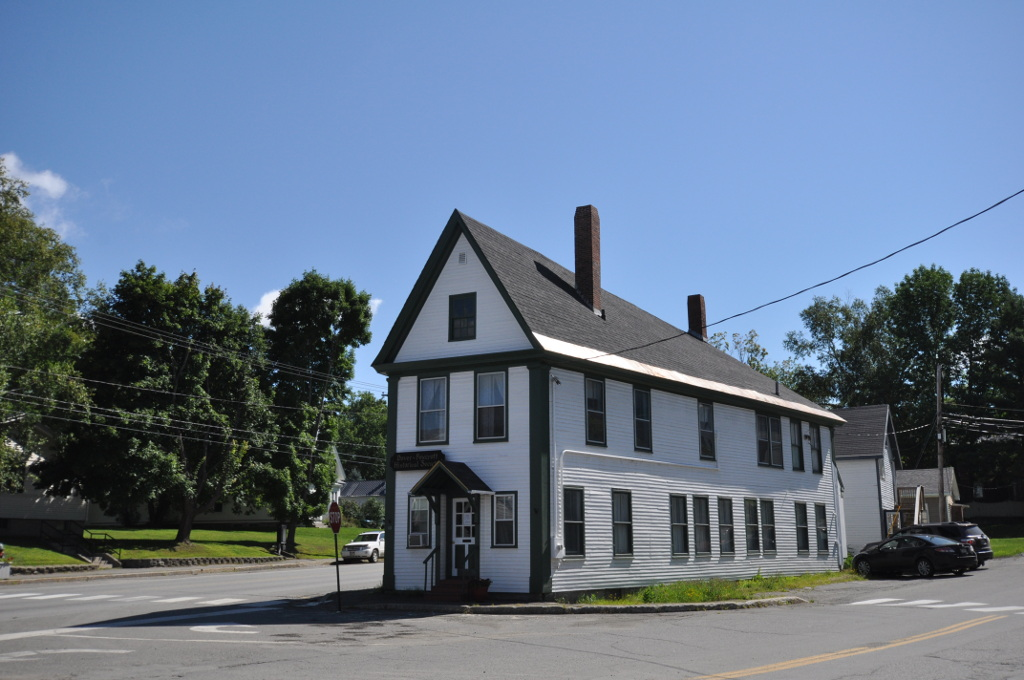

- Location within Maine Location within the United States
- Location: 128 Union Sq., Dover-Foxcroft, Maine
- Coordinates: 45°11′0.24″N 69°13′38.28″W
- Area: less than one acre
- Built: 1854
- Architectural style: Greek Revival
- NRHP reference No.: 98000724
- Added to NRHP: June 26, 1998

The Observer Building is a historic commercial and residential building located at 128 Union Square in Dover-Foxcroft, Maine. Built in 1854, it is an architecturally unusual Greek Revival wood-frame "flatiron" triangular building with a variable-pitch gable roof. In addition to its architectural significance, it is also historically significant as the home for many years of The Piscataquis Observer, one of Maine's oldest weekly newspapers. The building is now owned by the Dover-Foxcroft Historical Society, which uses it as a museum and storage space.

== Description and history ==
The building stands at a prominent triangular intersection in the center of Dover-Foxcroft, where Pleasant Street diverges from East Main Street (Maine State Route 15). The building itself is a roughly triangular two-story wood-frame structure, presenting a narrow three-bay front to the junction. Its roof is one of its most unusual features, beginning at the front with a nearly equilateral triangular gable pitch, which flattens out toward the rear of the building, giving an effect similar to an inverted ship's hull. The front facade has a doorway flanked by sash windows on the first floor, and a pair of symmetrically placed windows on the second, and a smaller sash window in the gable. The doorway, like others on the building, is sheltered by a gable-roof portico supported by simple wooden brackets. The corners of the front facade are highlighted by wooden pilasters. The long south side of the building has nine windows on the first floor and eight on the second, while the north side has eight windows and two doorways on the first floor and eight windows on the second.

The building was constructed in 1854 by William Sargent, and was apparently used as a residential tenement house. In 1903, it was acquired by George Doore, who converted it to a commercial space, and leased it the Observer Publishing Company, publisher of The Piscataquis Observer. The Observer, a weekly newspaper, has a publication history dating to 1838. It was first known as the Piscataquis Herald, was renamed the Piscataquis Farmer in 1842, and finally settled on Observer in 1847. It is one of Maine's oldest weekly newspapers.

The Observer housed its offices and printing operations in this building until 1997, when it gave the building to the Dover-Foxcroft Historical Society. The society operates the first floor as a museum, and uses the upstairs as a storage, office, and meeting space.

It was listed on the National Register of Historic Places on June 26, 1998.

== See also ==
- National Register of Historic Places listings in Piscataquis County, Maine
