= Former Free Will Baptist Church =

Historic church in Maine, United States

- Free Will Baptist Church (Former)
- U.S. National Register of Historic Places
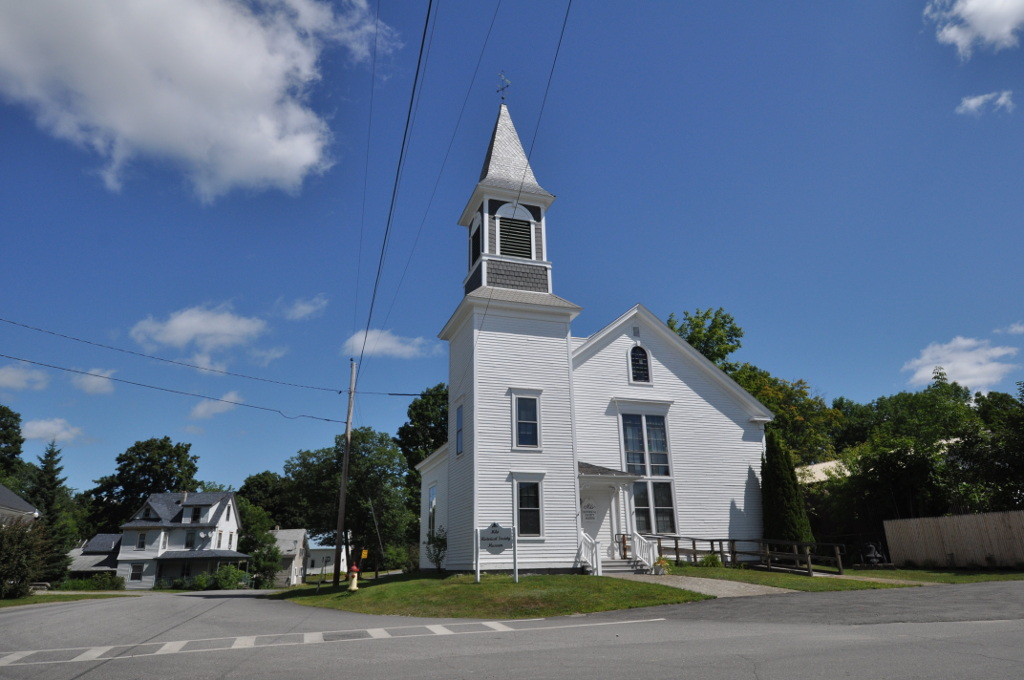

- Location within Maine Location within the United States
- Location: Jct. of High St. and Highland Ave., Milo, Maine
- Coordinates: 45°15′11″N 68°59′4″W
- Area: less than one acre
- Built: 1853
- Architectural style: Mid 19th Century Revival, Late Victorian
- NRHP reference No.: 00001205
- Added to NRHP: October 12, 2000

The Former Free Will Baptist Church is a historic church building at 12 High Street in Milo, Maine. It is home to the Milo Historical Society Museum. Built in 1853, this wood-frame structure was Milo's first church, shared initially by Baptist and Free Will Baptist congregations before becoming the exclusive property of the latter. It has served as the local history museum since 1996. The building was listed on the National Register of Historic Places in 2000.

== Description and history ==
The church is a single-story wood-frame structure, with clapboarded exterior and a front-gable roof. A square tower stands attached to the main block's southwest corner, topped by a belfry and a pyramidal roof. The main (southwest-facing) facade has a large central grouping of four sash windows, two over two, with a shallow hood above, and a round-arch louvered opening in the gable end. The main entrance is between this window group and the tower, sheltered by a portico with jigsawn brackets. The left facade has two windows in the wall of the nave and one in the tower, and there are three similar windows in the right facade. The interior is virtually unaltered since its last major renovation c. 1900.

The Free Will Baptist congregation in Milo was established in 1827, and was the community's first organized congregation. It was joined in 1840 by a Baptist congregation. The two groups negotiated for many years concerning the construction of a sanctuary, but nothing occurred beyond the donation of land until William Owen, a local farmer and a member of the Baptist congregation, took it upon himself in 1853 to fund and oversee the construction of the present building's main block, albeit with vernacular Greek Revival styling. Owen was partially compensated for his efforts by the sale of pews. The building was used by both congregations until 1888, when the Baptists moved to a separate building.

The Free Will Baptists in about 1900 made significant alterations to the building, adding the tower and exterior Queen Anne elements, and redecorating the interior. Their congregation formally merged with the Baptists in 1913, occupying the Baptist edifice on Pleasant Street. This building was afterward used by Christian Scientist and Episcopal congregations before its acquisition in 1996 by the Milo Historical Society.

== See also ==
- National Register of Historic Places listings in Piscataquis County, Maine
