= Ambajejus Boom House =

- U.S. National Register of Historic Places
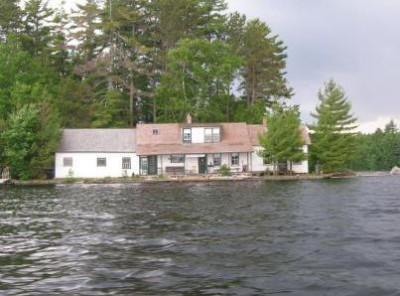

- Location within Maine Location within the United States
- Nearest city: Millinocket, Maine
- Coordinates: 45°43′57″N 68°53′42″W
- Area: 0 acres (0 ha)
- Built: 1907
- NRHP reference No.: 73000145
- Added to NRHP: April 2, 1973

The Ambajejus Boom House is an historic logging facility in remote central Maine. Built in 1907 on a small island in Ambajejus Lake, it is the only surviving structure associated with the great logging drives that drove the economy of inland Maine for decades. It was listed on the National Register of Historic Places in 1973. The building has been rehabilitated and can be visited by boat from various launch points on the lake.

== Description and history ==
The boom house is a single-story wood frame structure, set on an island in the northwest corner of Ambajejus Lake, just south of where the West Branch Penobscot River enters the lake. It is about 100 feet (30 m) long and 15 feet (4.6 m) wide, and is divided into three sections. The central portion, which is the oldest part, has a gable roof with an attic area; the other two sections were likely added not long after the first section was built in 1907. The building is on a site where there has been a documented boom house since the 1830s, which was likely a facility mentioned by Henry David Thoreau in his writings about a trip to the area.

The house is built at a strategic point in the movement of logs down river toward the paper mills of Millinocket. The island, along with a second one to the north, forms a choke point where a containment boom can be stretched across the river. The booms would be used to collect logs in large numbers, which would then be towed down the chain of lakes to North Twin Dam, where they would be released and sent further downriver. Log drives of this sort took place on the West Branch Penobscot until 1971.

== See also ==
- National Register of Historic Places listings in Piscataquis County, Maine
