= Burgess House (Sebec, Maine) =

Historic house in Maine, United States

- U.S. National Register of Historic Places
- Location within Maine Location within the United States
- Location: Burgess Road, Sebec, Maine, United States
- Coordinates: 45°16′10″N 69°6′53″W
- Area: 0.5 acres (0.20 ha)
- Built: 1816
- Built by: Ichabod Young
- Artists: Moses Eaton, Jr., Rufus Porter
- Architectural style: Cape form
- NRHP reference No.: 78000196
- Added to NRHP: May 3, 1978

The Burgess House is a historic house on Burgess Road, just east of Austin Road in Sebec, Maine, United States. The oldest portion of this wood-frame house dates to about 1816, and was built by Ichabod Young, who erected the first fulling mill in Piscataquis County. The house is most remarkable for its high-quality interior woodwork, and for the artwork on the walls of several of its rooms, which includes paintings by Rufus Porter and stencilwork by Moses Eaton, Jr., two noted itinerant artists of the early-to-mid 19th century. The house was listed on the National Register of Historic Places in 1978.

== Description and history ==
The Burgess Houses is a typical New England wood-frame connected homestead, consisting of a main block and two ells, which in this instance connect the main house to a modern one-car garage rather than the more typical barn or carriage house. The main block is a 1 1/2-story Cape style structure, five bays in width, with a large central chimney. Its centered entry is flanked by sidelight windows and topped by a louvered transom. The flanking bays contain sash windows with louvered shutters. The first ell, also 1 1/2 stories, is three bays long, also with a central chimney and a centered entrance, and is narrower than the main block is wide. The second ell is also three bays wide, but the bays are narrower, and all have windows. All three sections have their primary facade facing north.

The interior of the house includes woodwork that exhibits attention to detail, most notably in the paneling on the first floor. The highlight of the interior is the well-preserved artwork found throughout the main block, which includes paintings by the itinerant artist Rufus Porter, and stencilwork by Moses Eaton, Jr. Both of these artists are among the few documented to do such work in the early-to-mid 19th century, and probably executed this work c. 1820.

Ichabod Young came to the area in 1816, and built a fulling mill on the north side of the Sebec River that same year. He probably built the main block of this house that same year, on the south side of the river. The ells were added c. 1830 and c. 1850. The house was owned in the late 19th century by Thomas Burgess.

== See also ==
- National Register of Historic Places listings in Piscataquis County, Maine
