= H. Hudson Law Office =

- U.S. National Register of Historic Places
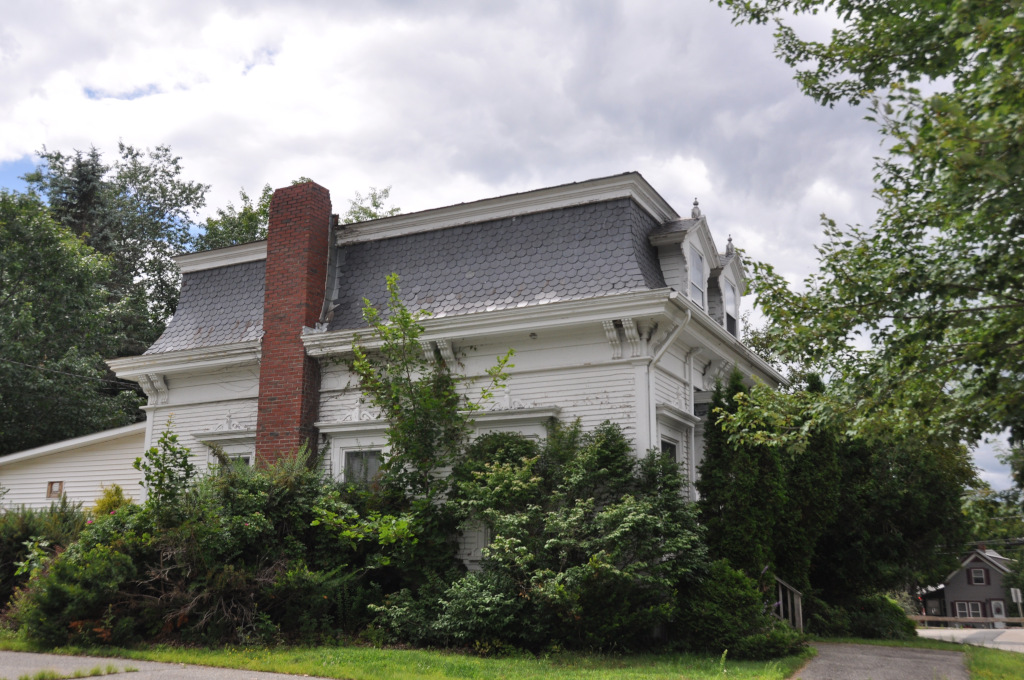

- Location within Maine Location within the United States
- Location: Hudson Ave., Guilford, Maine
- Coordinates: 45°10′1″N 69°23′6″W
- Area: 0.3 acres (0.12 ha)
- Built: 1867
- Architectural style: Italianate
- NRHP reference No.: 79000162
- Added to NRHP: October 9, 1979

The H. Hudson Law Office is a historic commercial building on Hudson Avenue in the center of Guilford, Maine. Built c. 1867, it is an architecturally distinctive small Italianate/Second Empire structure, which was used by two generations of lawyers in the Hudson family as a law office. The building was listed on the National Register of Historic Places in 1979.

== Description and history ==
The Hudson Law Office building is located near the center of Guilford, on the west side of Hudson Avenue a short way south of its junction with Maine State Route 150. It is a wood-frame structure, 1 1/2 stories in height, with a flared slate mansard roof, wooden clapboard siding, and a granite foundation. Its main (east-facing) facade is three bays wide, with sash windows in the outer bays and the entrance in the center. The windows are topped by lintels with an entablature and carved woodwork above. The main entrance is sheltered by a hood with ornately carved brackets. There are two dormers above, with gable roofs topped by finials, and decorative carvings on the sides. The building is one of the most architecturally sophisticated buildings in the rural community.

The office was built c. 1867 by Henry Hudson, a prominent lawyer who conducted his practice in Guilford from 1849 until his death in 1877. His son, also a lawyer, continued to use the office until his retirement in 1919. After undergoing a variety of other uses in the 20th century, it was once again made into a law office in the 1970s.

== See also ==
- National Register of Historic Places listings in Piscataquis County, Maine
