= Walter and Eva Burgess Farm =

- Formerly listed on the U.S. National Register of Historic Places
- Location within Maine Location within the United States
- Nearest city: Macomber Corner, Maine
- Coordinates: 45°6′27″N 69°13′49″W
- Area: 206 acres (83 ha)
- Built: 1914
- Architect: Brann, C.B.; Sands, F.E.
- Architectural style: Square House
- NRHP reference No.: 97000312

Significant dates
- Added to NRHP: April 14, 1997
- Removed from NRHP: July 14, 2015

The Walter and Eva Burgess Farm was a historic farm at 257 Shaw Road in the rural southwestern part of Dover-Foxcroft, Maine known as Macomber Corner. The main farmstead, including a house and barn, were built in 1914 after the 19th-century farmstead was destroyed by fire. The property represented a virtually intact and well-preserved early 20th-century farmstead of rural Maine, and was stylistically distinctive because not very much new farm construction took place at that time in the state. The farm was listed on the National Register of Historic Places in 1997. This farmstead, including the historic house and barn, was destroyed by fire in 2013. It was removed from the National Register in 2015.

== Description and history ==
The Burgess farm began in 1834, with the purchase of 100 acres (40 ha) by William Burgess, who erected a log cabin on the property before eventually building a frame house. He transferred his property, a successful operation which included a small dairy herd and a flock of sheep, to his son John O. Burgess in stages between 1860 and 1877. Almost the entire farm complex was destroyed by fire on December 23, 1913, by which time the operation of the farm had been taken over by John's son Walter and his wife Eva. An ell was built onto a surviving blacksmithy to provide temporary living space for the family while a new house and barn were built.

Both the house and barn built by the Burgesses included recent innovations not found in many farms in rural Maine, because agriculture was generally in decline. The barn was a large structure with a gambrel roof, a western innovation that improved hay storage capacity, and the larger number of milking stations indicated that the farm was shifting to an increased emphasis in dairy production. The house was a two-story frame foursquare structure, with a hip roof. A single-story hip-roofed porch, supported by Tuscan columns, spanned the front and wraps around to one side. The interior retained original varnished woodwork. An ell joined the house to the barn. The entire complex was engulfed by an accidental fire, probably started by sparks in the barn, and destroyed in July 2013.

== See also ==
- National Register of Historic Places listings in Piscataquis County, Maine
