= Slate House (Brownville, Maine) =

Historic house in Maine, United States

- U.S. National Register of Historic Places
- Location within Maine Location within the United States
- Location: 123 Church St., Brownville, Maine
- Coordinates: 45°18′52″N 69°1′46″W
- Area: 25 acres (10 ha)
- Built: 1860
- Architectural style: Italianate
- NRHP reference No.: 95000217
- Added to NRHP: March 10, 1995

The Slate House is an architecturally distinctive house at 123 Church Street in Brownville, Maine. Built c. 1860, it is the only known house to have foundations and wall exteriors fashioned entirely out of slate. It was built by the Brownville and Piscataquis Slate Company, a local quarrying operation, for its superintendent, and is believed to be unique within New England for the use of material and level of Italianate styling it presents. It was listed on the National Register of Historic Places in 1995.

== Description and history ==
The Slate House is set on a 25-acre (10 ha) parcel north of the central village of Brownville. It is a two-story structure, roughly square in shape, with a low-pitch hip roof with bracketed eaves. A shed joins the main house to a carriage house at the southeast corner. A wooden trim water table separates the foundation from the first floor, and the front corners of the building have wide wooden pilasters. The west-facing front has three symmetrically arranged bays, with paired sash windows flanking the centered entrance on the first floor, and single sash windows flanking a round-arch window above the entrance. The house has a wooden frame, which rests on a foundation composed of stacked pieces of slate. The main entrance is accessed by steps fashioned from larger pieces of slate. The front and side facades are covered with scalloped slate shingles. The attached shed and carriage house are also wood-frame structures, but are finished in board-and-batten siding. The interior of the house has retained much of its original finish.

Construction of the house was traditionally dated to about 1848, but architectural evidence and the history of the slate quarry suggest a construction date in the early 1860s. Originally called the Crocker Quarry, operations began at Brownville's quarry in 1843 or 1844. Samuel Crocker, the Boston businessman who owned, formed the Brownville and Piscataquis Slate Company in 1855, which reported production 7,000 squares of slate roofing in 1860. The first occupant of this house is believed to be William Sparrow, who served as the quarry's superintendent in the early 1860s. Documentary evidence suggests the house was built by the quarry company as a means to demonstrate varied uses of its material. The house remained part of the quarry property until 1924, when it was sold into private hands; the quarry itself was permanently closed in 1910.

Houses built of slate are only known regionally to have been built near slate quarries in Vermont, where all known instances lack the styling of this one. The material was not without problems as a wall finish—the cost to heat the house prior to the addition of insulation to its walls was a high 35 cords of wood.

== See also ==
- National Register of Historic Places listings in Piscataquis County, Maine
