= Swedish Lutheran Church (Monson, Maine) =

Historic church in Maine, United States

- U.S. National Register of Historic Places
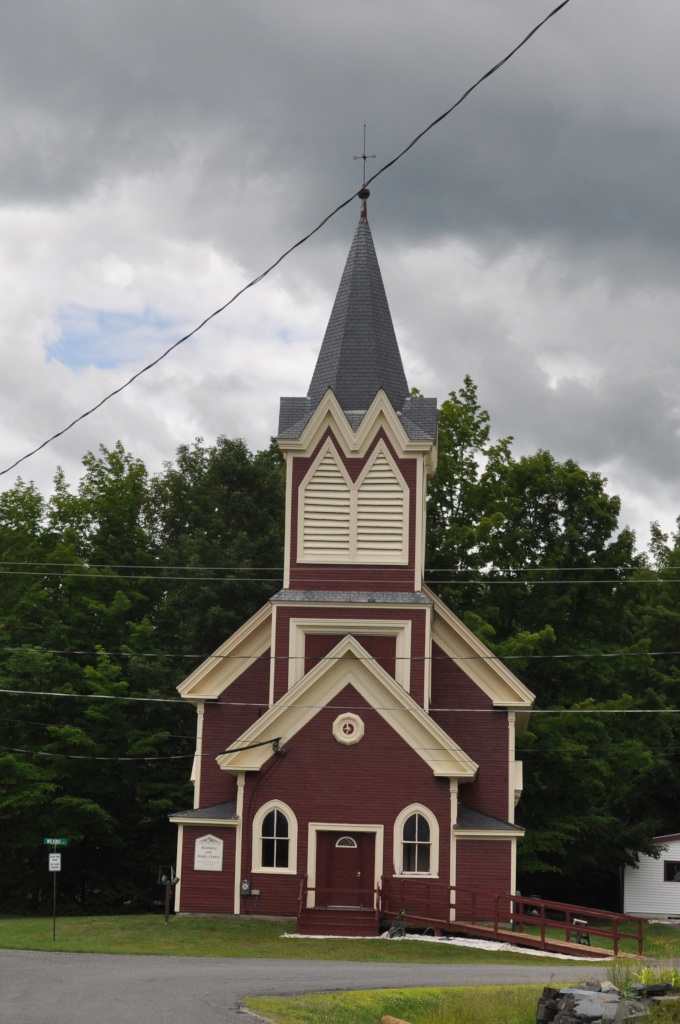

- Location within Maine Location within the United States
- Location: Wilkins and Hebron Sts., Monson, Maine
- Coordinates: 45°17′9″N 69°30′10″W
- Area: 0.5 acres (0.20 ha)
- Built: 1890
- Architectural style: Gothic
- NRHP reference No.: 84001489
- Added to NRHP: July 19, 1984

The Swedish Lutheran Church (also known as the Old Church Hostel) is a historic former Swedish Lutheran church building on Wilkins and Hebron Streets in Monson, Maine. The church was established by Swedish immigrants to Maine and built by them in 1890. It is architecturally distinctive as an uncommon example of Swedish-influenced religious architecture in Maine, and was listed on the National Register of Historic Places in 1984. The building is now a study center of the Areopagus II America Institute (AIIA), a Christian religious apologetics organization.

== Description and history ==
The church building is located at the western corner of Hebron and Wilkins Streets, two quiet side streets in the center of Monson, Maine. The building faces northeast, and is a single-story wood frame structure with clapboard siding, gable roof, and Gothic styling. A vestibule with a lower gable roof projects from the main building, and is topped by a two-stage square tower. The entrance is flanked by lancet-arched windows, with a small bullseye design in the gable. The first stage of the tower is paneled, and the second, housing the belfry, has paired pointed-arch louvered openings on each side. The tower is capped by an octagonal steeple. The building's side windows are lancet-arched, and are capped by small gables.

The Monson area received an influx of immigrants in the mid-1870s, drawn to work in the nearby slate quarries. Most of these were Swedish, and they built this church in 1890 to serve their population, which was a diverse mix of Christian denominations. After the Methodists split in 1892, the church was exclusively used by Swedish Lutheran congregants. The building was used as the local American Legion chapter between 1946 and 1970, and was afterward operated for a time as a hostel serving hikers on the Appalachian Trail. The building now houses the study center of the Areopagus II America Institute (AIIA), a Christian apologetics organization founded in 1991.

== See also ==
- National Register of Historic Places listings in Piscataquis County, Maine
