= Greenville Junction station =

Greenville Junction
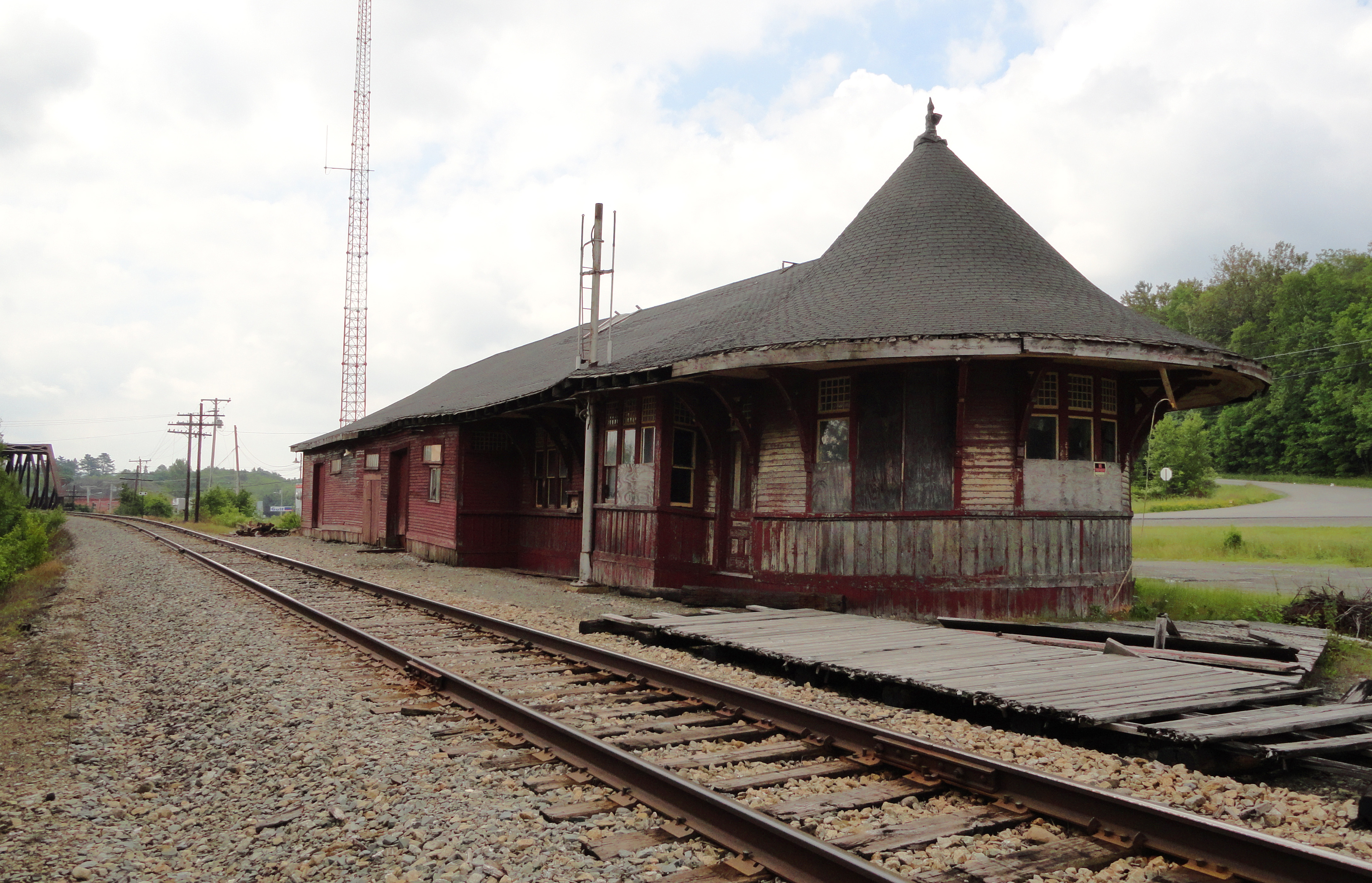
- The station in 2011.

General information
- Coordinates: 45.463337°N 69.622632°W

History
- Opened: 1889
- Closed: 1965
- Rebuilt: 1911

Former services
Preceding station	Canadian Pacific Railway	Following station
Squaw Brook toward Montreal Windsor	Montreal – McAdam	Morkill toward McAdam
- Canadian Pacific Railway Depot, Greenville Junction, Maine
- U.S. National Register of Historic Places
- Location: 0.2 mi (0.32 km) N of the intersection of Rockwood Road & Pritham Ave (Rte 15/6)
- Built: 1889
- Architectural style: Late Victorian/Queen Anne
- NRHP reference No.: 100000809
- Added to NRHP: March 27, 2017
Location

The Greenville Junction Depot is a historic railway station at Greenville Junction, Maine. The wood frame, one-story building was opened in 1889 with an addition made in 1911. The station is notable for the “witch’s hat” conical roof at one end of the building. The combined passenger/freight depot was used from 1889 to 1965, when it closed. The building was listed on the National Register of Historic Places in 2017 as the Canadian Pacific Railway Depot, Greenville Junction, Maine.
