= Munsungan-Chase Lake Thoroughfare Archeological District =

Historic district in Maine, United States

- U.S. National Register of Historic Places
- U.S. Historic district
- Location within Maine Location within the United States
- Nearest city: Millinocket Lake, Maine
- Coordinates: 46°24′11″N 69°1′29″W
- Area: 45 acres (18 ha)
- NRHP reference No.: 79000163
- Added to NRHP: September 6, 1979

The Munsungan-Chase Lake Thoroughfare Archeological District encompasses a series of important archaeological sites in a remote area of northern Maine, United States. These sites offer evidence of human habitation dating to not long after the retreat of the glaciers following the Wisconsin glaciation, with extensive stone tool workshops working with red chert found in abundance in the area. Stone tools made from sources in this region have been found at archaeological sites across New England. The district was listed on the National Register of Historic Places in 1979.

== Description ==
Munsungan (or Munsungun) Lake and Chase Lake are located in far northern Piscataquis County, Maine, draining via Munsungan Stream and the Aroostook River into the Saint John River. The two lakes are connected to each other by a relatively short waterway called The Thoroughfare. In the area on either side of the lakes there are a series of rock outcrops containing a variety of chert that early human occupants found useful for the manufacture of stone tools. Although the lakes probably had a higher level then than they do now, a series of well-drained terraces on either side of The Thoroughfare were apparently favorable for the habitation.

Archaeological investigation of the larger region have identified more than 100 sites of interest. The Thoroughfare region includes seven areas where evidence habitation dating from the Ceramic period to the Paleoindian have been identified. One of the major sites in the district, the Fluted Point Site (survey number 154.14) covers more than 3,000 square metres (32,000 sq ft), representing a large habitation and workshop area, while another, the Windy Point Site (survey number 154.16) is a much smaller workshop site. Both of these were excavated in the early 1980s.

== Munsungan Lake ==
Munsungan Lake
- Location within Maine
- Location: Piscataquis County, Maine
- Coordinates: 46°22′N 68°59′W
- Primary inflows: Chase Lake
- Primary outflows: Munsungan Stream
- Basin countries: United States
- Max. length: 5 mi (8.0 km)
- Max. width: 1 mi (1.6 km)
- Surface area: 1,600 acres (650 ha)
- Max. depth: 123 feet (37 m)
- Water volume: 69,087 acre⋅ft (85,218,000 m^{3})
- Surface elevation: 810 ft (250 m)

Native populations of togue and land-locked Atlantic salmon use the cold-water habitat of this deep lake. These large fish prey on rainbow smelt and squaretail spawning in tributaries Atkins Brook, Bluffer Brook, Cedar Brook, Chase Brook, Currier Brook, Munsungan Brook, Norway Brook, and Reed Brook.

== See also ==
- National Register of Historic Places listings in Piscataquis County, Maine
