= Rockwood, Maine =

- Village
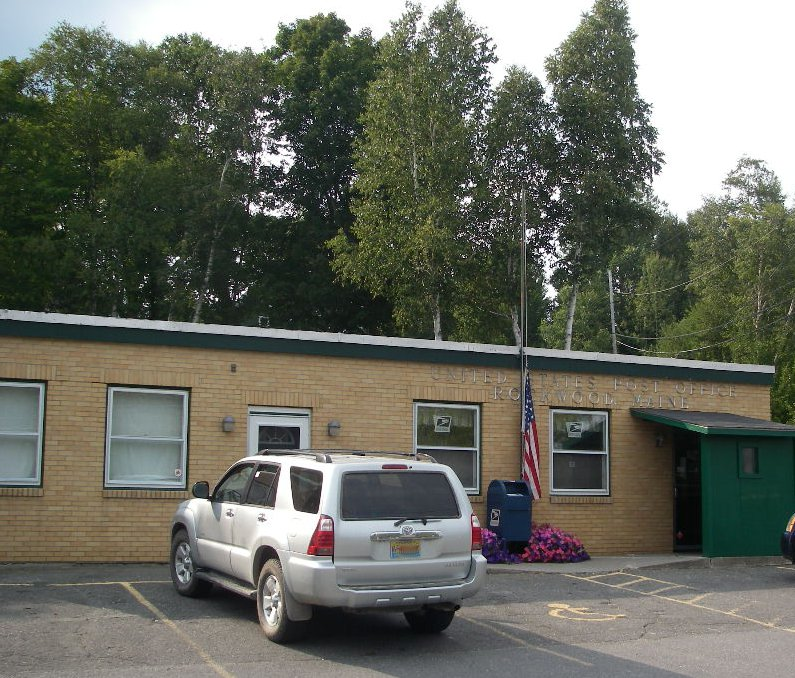
- Rockwood Post Office

- Location within Maine Location within the United States
- Coordinates: 45°40′42″N 69°44′50″W
- Country: United States
- State: Maine
- County: Somerset
- Elevation: 1,079 ft (329 m)
- Time zone: UTC-5 (Eastern (EST))
  - Summer (DST): UTC-4 (EDT)
- ZIP Code: 04478
- Area code: 207
- GNIS feature ID: 574365

Rockwood is an Unincorporated area in Somerset County, Maine, United States. The village is centered on the west side of Moosehead Lake, the largest body of fresh water in the state. Rockwood is a gateway to the north country and is located near Mount Kineo.

Rockwood is an unincorporated community with a significant enough population base to have its own post office and telephone exchange, but it has never been organized as a plantation or incorporated as a town. It currently maintains a registrar and clerk, but has never had a true organized municipal government. Its chief economical base is vacation destination and outdoor recreation. Rockwood is part of the township of Rockwood Strip (T1R1) located within the Northeast Somerset Unorganized Territory.

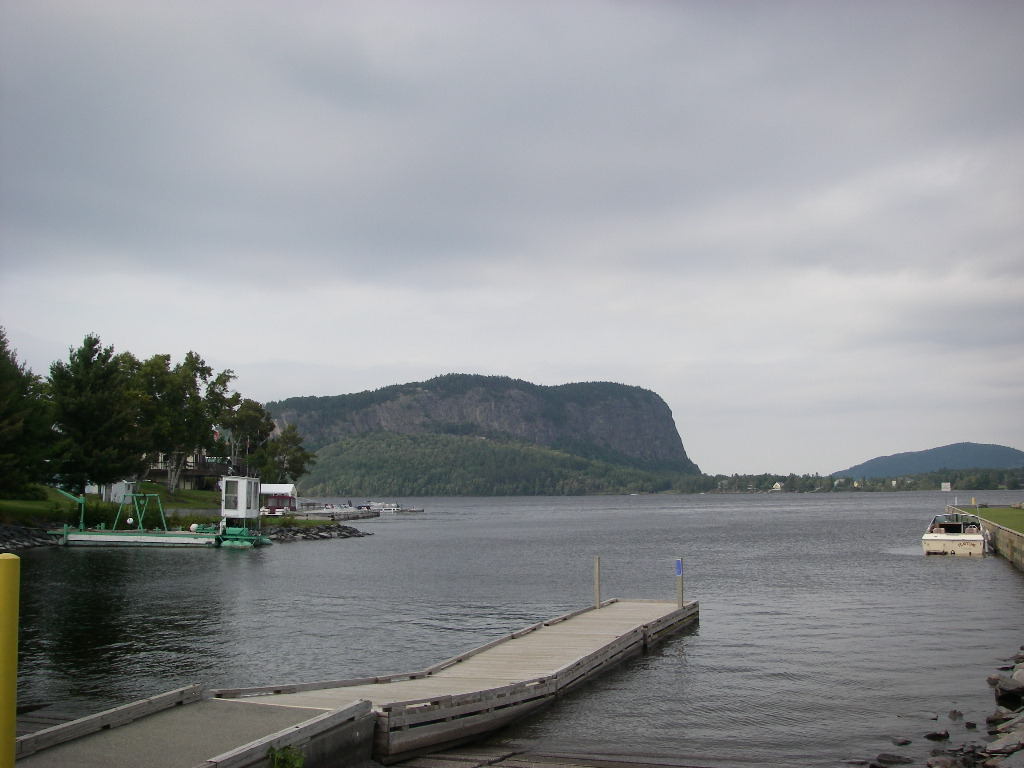
Mt. Kineo from Rockwood

On April 15, 2023, at around 8:30 A.M EST (Eastern Standard Time), a CPKC (Canadian Pacific Kansas City) freight train derailed southwest of Rockwood, causing a minor forest fire. The train was carrying six Lumber cars and three locomotives. Three railroad workers were taken to a nearby hospital with non-life-threatening injuries. This event occurred just the day after The Canadian Pacific Railway (CP) and the Kansas City Southern Railway (KCS) had officially merged into one.

== Climate ==
Brassua Dam is approximately three miles (4.8 km) west of Rockwood, upstream from the Moosehead River inlet. Brassua Dam has a humid continental climate (Köppen Dfb), bordering on subarctic climate (Köppen Dfc).

Climate data for Brassua Dam, Maine 1991–2020 normals, extremes 1929-2020: 1069ft (326m)
Month	Jan	Feb	Mar	Apr	May	Jun	Jul	Aug	Sep	Oct	Nov	Dec	Year
Record high °F (°C)	55 (13)	69 (21)	75 (24)	80 (27)	89 (32)	96 (36)	93 (34)	97 (36)	94 (34)	82 (28)	70 (21)	60 (16)	97 (36)
Mean maximum °F (°C)	44 (7)	45 (7)	53 (12)	68 (20)	79 (26)	86 (30)	86 (30)	86 (30)	81 (27)	71 (22)	59 (15)	49 (9)	89 (32)
Mean daily maximum °F (°C)	22.3 (−5.4)	25.2 (−3.8)	34.7 (1.5)	47.1 (8.4)	61.6 (16.4)	71.1 (21.7)	75.7 (24.3)	74.9 (23.8)	67.3 (19.6)	53.3 (11.8)	40.1 (4.5)	28.7 (−1.8)	50.2 (10.1)
Daily mean °F (°C)	11.7 (−11.3)	12.8 (−10.7)	22.8 (−5.1)	36.4 (2.4)	49.8 (9.9)	59.9 (15.5)	65.2 (18.4)	63.9 (17.7)	56.2 (13.4)	43.9 (6.6)	32.4 (0.2)	20.3 (−6.5)	39.6 (4.2)
Mean daily minimum °F (°C)	1.0 (−17.2)	0.5 (−17.5)	11.0 (−11.7)	25.6 (−3.6)	38.0 (3.3)	48.6 (9.2)	54.7 (12.6)	52.9 (11.6)	45.1 (7.3)	34.5 (1.4)	24.7 (−4.1)	12.0 (−11.1)	29.1 (−1.7)
Mean minimum °F (°C)	−21 (−29)	−19 (−28)	−13 (−25)	11 (−12)	26 (−3)	35 (2)	44 (7)	41 (5)	31 (−1)	22 (−6)	8 (−13)	−10 (−23)	−24 (−31)
Record low °F (°C)	−37 (−38)	−39 (−39)	−35 (−37)	−8 (−22)	18 (−8)	26 (−3)	34 (1)	29 (−2)	20 (−7)	12 (−11)	−10 (−23)	−32 (−36)	−39 (−39)
Average precipitation inches (mm)	2.70 (69)	2.45 (62)	2.92 (74)	3.57 (91)	3.68 (93)	4.69 (119)	4.33 (110)	3.83 (97)	3.42 (87)	4.57 (116)	3.49 (89)	3.60 (91)	43.25 (1,098)
Average snowfall inches (cm)	22.0 (56)	24.0 (61)	20.6 (52)	6.9 (18)	0.3 (0.76)	0.0 (0.0)	0.0 (0.0)	0.0 (0.0)	0.0 (0.0)	1.8 (4.6)	7.4 (19)	24.7 (63)	107.7 (274.36)
Source 1: NOAA
Source 2: XMACIS (temp records & monthly max/mins)

== Education ==
The Maine Department of Education takes responsibility for coordinating school assignments in the unorganized territory. As of 2025 it states it assigns areas in the "Rockwood Strip" to Greenville Consolidated School.

The state department of education previously operated Rockwood Elementary School in Rockwood Township. The enrollment had declined by 2002 as the area focused on tourism and retirees became predominant residents of the area. By then the state began talks about closing the school. In 2003 enrollment was 11. In 2002 the principal and main teacher were the same person, and the school also had an aide. In previous eras multiple local residents advocated for keeping the school open. There were some residents who expressed a desire to send their children to Greenwood's elementary school. The Maine Legislature, by 2011, decided that the Rockwood school building should be sold.

== See also ==
- Historical U.S. Census Totals for Somerset County, Maine
