= Chesuncook, Maine =

- Chesuncook Village
- U.S. National Register of Historic Places
- U.S. Historic district
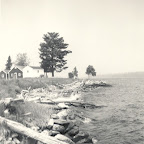
- Photo c. 1964

- Location within Maine Location within the United States
- Location: NW Shore, Chesuncook Lake, Piscataquis County, Maine
- Coordinates: 46°3′36″N 69°24′38″W
- Area: 560 acres (230 ha)
- Built: 1849
- NRHP reference No.: 73000262
- Added to NRHP: April 11, 1973

Chesuncook (/tʃɪˈsʌnkʊk/, chih-SUN-kuuk) is a small unincorporated settlement on the northwestern shore of Chesuncook Lake in rural central Piscataquis County, Maine. A small village, originally supporting logging operations in the area, has existed here since at least the time of Henry David Thoreau, who wrote about it in The Maine Woods. The village is now a primarily seasonal settlement that caters principally to outdoors enthusiasts. Seven historic properties on or near the "Main Street" fronting the lake were listed on the National Register of Historic Places in 1973.

== History ==
Chesuncook Village is located on the northwestern shore of Chesuncook Lake, near the mouth of the West Branch Penobscot River. It is about 60 miles (97 km) by (generally gravel) road from Millinocket. Originally the site of an Abenaki encampment, it arose in the 1840s as a frontier logging village, after damming the river enlarged the lake and made possible logging drives further upstream. Henry David Thoreau described the village in The Maine Woods after his visit 1853 as having "quite a harbor". The village's oldest surviving house, the Chesuncook Lake House, was built in 1864 as a boarding house and lodge, and the village grew over the following decades, reaching a population of about 65 in 1900 and about 250 in 1920. The nature of logging drives in the region was altered by the construction of the Ripogenus Dam in 1916, and the village declined in the 20th century. The Chesuncook Lake House burned down on March 17, 2018 at 2:30am.

In addition to the Chesuncook Lake House, there are a series of smaller summer houses along the waterfront, extending to the north toward Graveyard Point. At Graveyard Point there are a few buildings constructed by the Great Northern Paper Company to provide housing for its workers. A short way inland is a combined church/school building, also built by the Great Northern; it is located near the cemetery, which was originally at Graveyard Point but was relocated due to the 1916 dam, which raised the water level.

== See also ==
- National Register of Historic Places listings in Piscataquis County, Maine
