= Ripogenus Gorge =

Canyon in Maine, USA

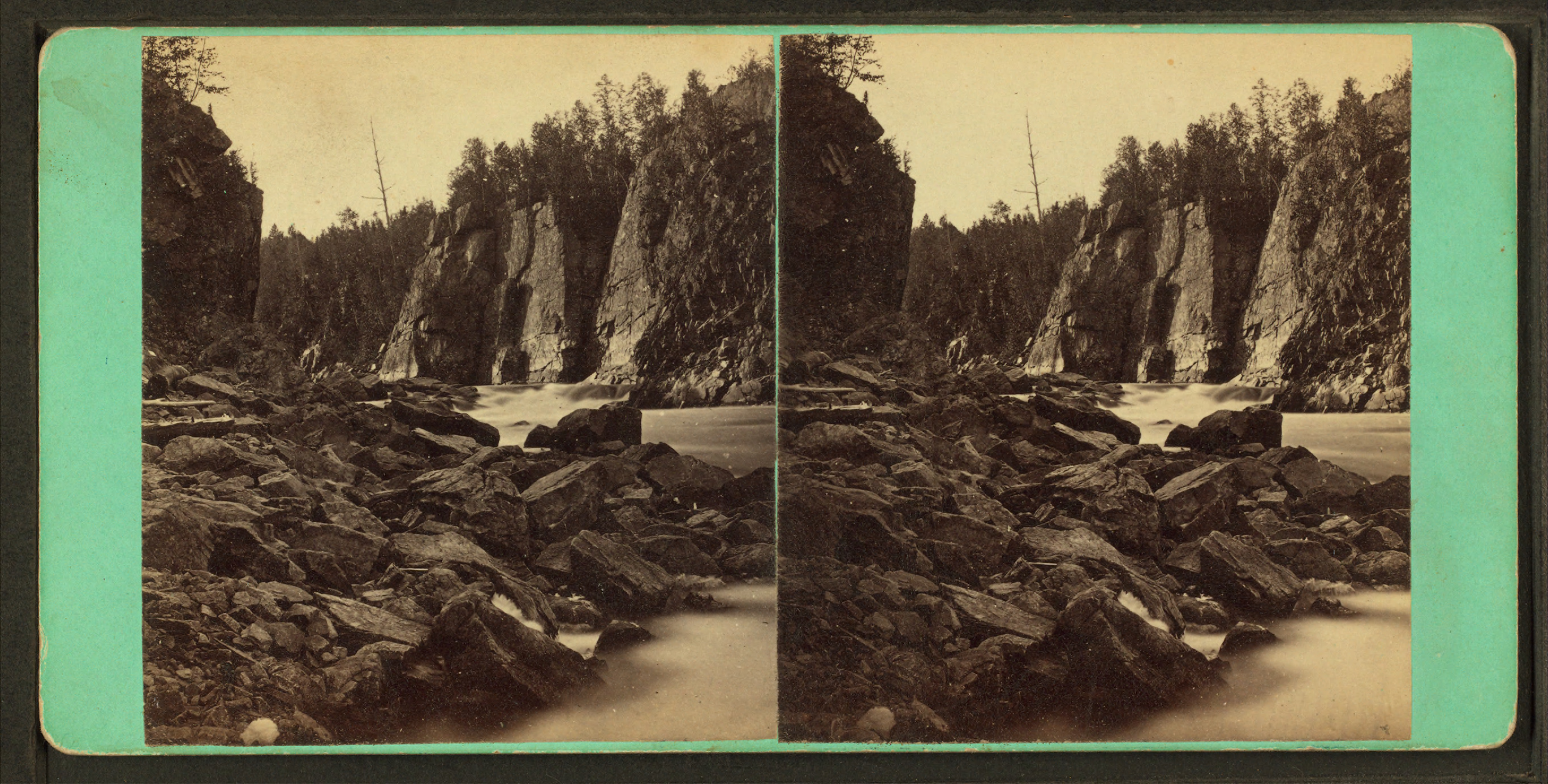
- 1870s view of Ripogenus Gorge
- Length: 10 miles (16 km)
- Width: 700 feet (210 m)

Geography
- Location: Northeast Piscataquis, Piscataquis County, Maine, USA
- Coordinates: 45°52′33″N 69°09′00″W
- Rivers: West Branch Penobscot River
- Interactive map of Ripogenus Gorge

Ripogenus Gorge is a rock-walled canyon formed in Maine where the West Branch Penobscot River intersects the Caribou Lake anticline. Ripogenus Falls controlled discharge from Ripogenus Lake until Ripogenus Dam was completed at the upstream end of the gorge in 1916. The dam forms a hydroelectric reservoir raising the level of Ripogenus Lake to include the upstream Chesuncook Lake, Caribou Lake, and Moose Pond. This reservoir is commonly referred to by the name of its largest included lake, Chesuncook. The gorge provides an unusual exposure of North Maine Woods bedrock typically covered by saturated glacial till. The Silurian Ripogenus Formation of weakly metamorphosed shallow marine siliciclastics and fossiliferous limestone, has been described from investigation of the gorge.

== History ==
Spruce forests along the west branch were harvested through the 19th century with logs floated through the gorge to sawmills as far downstream as Bangor, Maine. Log driving rivermen altered the gorge with dynamite and timber cribs filled with stone to prevent log jams. Construction of Ripogenus Dam began in 1915 to provide hydroelectricity for the paper mill at Millinocket, Maine. The dam is 92 feet (28 m) high and 704 feet (215 m) long and impounds the largest storage reservoir ever built with private funding. Hydroelectricity is generated by diverting 2,400 cu ft/s (68 m^{3}/s) through a mile-long penstock around the former falls. Pulpwood was sluiced over the dam until 1971 when Great Northern Paper Company began trucking the lumber to the mill via the Golden Road.

== Whitewater recreation ==
Penstock releases through the gorge create a popular whitewater run through class IV rapids with a class IV+ boulder garden. Rafts and kayaks navigate between rock cliffs through colorfully named Exterminator Hole (IV), Staircase (IV), Fist of God, Big Heater, Little Heater, Troublemaker Hole (III+), Cribworks (V), Turkey Chute, Final Chute, Postage Stamp Rock, and Bonecruncher (III).
