= Northeast Piscataquis, Maine =

- Unorganized territory
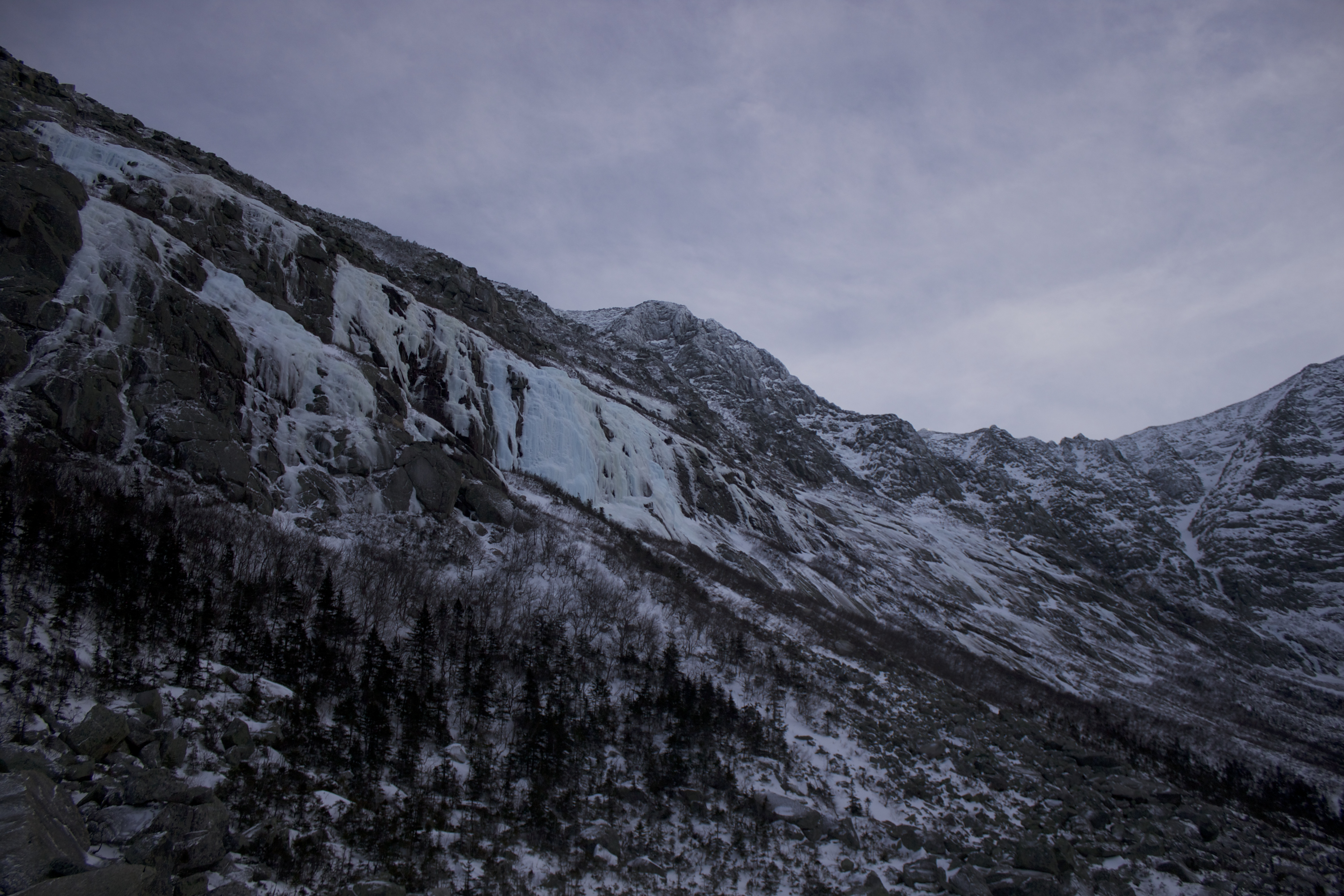

- Location in Piscataquis County and the state of Maine
- Coordinates: 45°54′37″N 69°05′13″W
- Country: United States
- State: Maine
- County: Piscataquis

Area
  - Total: 1,820.4 sq mi (4,714.8 km^{2})
  - Land: 1,710.5 sq mi (4,430.3 km^{2})
  - Water: 109.8 sq mi (284.5 km^{2})
- Elevation: 1,404 ft (428 m)

Population (2020)
  - Total: 304
  - Density: 0.178/sq mi (0.0686/km^{2})
- Time zone: UTC-5 (Eastern (EST))
  - Summer (DST): UTC-4 (EDT)
- ZIP Codes: 04414 (Brownville); 04441 (Greenville); 04443 (Guilford); 04462 (Millinocket); 04732 (Ashland)
- Area code: 207
- FIPS code: 23-51105
- GNIS feature ID: 582629

Northeast Piscataquis is an unincorporated area in Piscataquis County, Maine, United States. The population was 304 at the 2020 census.

== Geography ==
According to the United States Census Bureau, the unorganized territory has a total area of 1,820.4 square miles (4,714.8 km^{2}), of which 1,710.5 square miles (4,430.3 km^{2}) is land and 109.8 square miles (284.5 km^{2}) (6.03%) is water.

The territory contains 42 townships plus parts of ten other townships (shared with Northwest Piscataquis).

Baxter State Park, the location of Mount Katahdin, Maine's highest mountain, is located within the territory.

== Demographics ==
Historical population
Census	Pop.	Note	%±
1980	132		—
1990	218		65.2%
2000	347		59.2%
2010	273		−21.3%
2020	304		11.4%
U.S. Decennial Census

As of the census of 2000, there were 347 people, 157 households, and 108 families residing in the unorganized territory. The population density was 0.2 inhabitants per square mile (0.077/km^{2}). There were 1,214 housing units at an average density of 0.7 per square mile (0.27/km^{2}). The racial makeup of the unorganized territory was 99.14% White, 0.29% Native American, 0.29% Asian, and 0.29% from two or more races.

There were 157 households, out of which 21.7% had children under the age of 18 living with them, 63.7% were married couples living together, 1.9% had a female householder with no husband present, and 31.2% were non-families. 27.4% of all households were made up of individuals, and 8.9% had someone living alone who was 65 years of age or older. The average household size was 2.21 and the average family size was 2.62.

In the unorganized territory the population was spread out, with 20.5% under the age of 18, 3.5% from 18 to 24, 22.8% from 25 to 44, 41.8% from 45 to 64, and 11.5% who were 65 years of age or older. The median age was 46 years. For every 100 females, there were 109.0 males. For every 100 females age 18 and over, there were 115.6 males.

The median income for a household in the unorganized territory was $31,250, and the median income for a family was $37,813. Males had a median income of $31,364 versus $16,250 for females. The per capita income for the unorganized territory was $15,643. About 7.7% of families and 10.9% of the population were below the poverty line, including 14.3% of those under age 18 and 7.7% of those age 65 or over.

== Williamsburg ==
The town of Williamsburg was dissolved and incorporated into Northeast Piscataquis in 1940. Williamsburg was located in the southern part of Piscataquis County, 17 miles north-east of Dover-Foxcroft. It was located to the west of Brownville. The West Branch of the Pleasant River ran through the town.

It was the hometown of Lieutenant Colonel Walter Goodale Morrill.

The area was first settled by people of European descent during the first decades of the 19th century, and was incorporated as a town in 1820.

In 1870, the town's population was 176, and this grew to 444 for the 1880 census. The 1900 census showed that Williamsburg had a population of 117, the smallest of all incorporated towns in the county. In 1910, it had a population of 138, the second smallest population of any incorporated place in the county. In 1920, the population dropped to 82 residents. In 1930, its final census as a separate town, Williamsburg's population was 67 people.

== Education ==
The Maine Department of Education takes responsibility for coordinating school assignments in the unorganized territories. Williamsburg is assigned to Maine School Administrative District 41 schools: Brownville Elementary School, Milo Elementary School, and Penquis Valley Middle/High School.
