= Sebec, Maine =

Town in Maine, United States

- Town
- Location in Piscataquis County and the state of Maine
- Coordinates: 45°14′31″N 69°6′24″W
- Country: United States
- State: Maine
- County: Piscataquis

Area
  - Total: 37.88 sq mi (98.11 km^{2})
  - Land: 36.76 sq mi (95.21 km^{2})
  - Water: 1.12 sq mi (2.90 km^{2})
- Elevation: 617 ft (188 m)

Population (2020)
  - Total: 665
  - Density: 18/sq mi (7/km^{2})
- Time zone: UTC-5 (Eastern (EST))
  - Summer (DST): UTC-4 (EDT)
- ZIP Codes: 04481 (Sebec); 04426 (Dover-Foxcroft)
- Area code: 207
- FIPS code: 23-66950
- GNIS feature ID: 0582718
- Website: https://townofsebec.com/

Sebec is a town in Piscataquis County, Maine, United States. The population was 665 at the 2020 census.

== Geography ==
According to the United States Census Bureau, the town has a total area of 37.88 square miles (98.11 km^{2}), of which 36.76 square miles (95.21 km^{2}) is land and 1.12 square miles (2.90 km^{2}) is water.

=== Climate ===
Climate data for Sebec Lake, Maine, 1991–2020 normals, 1993-2020 extremes: 380ft (116m)
Month	Jan	Feb	Mar	Apr	May	Jun	Jul	Aug	Sep	Oct	Nov	Dec	Year
Record high °F (°C)	55 (13)	62 (17)	70 (21)	87 (31)	91 (33)	97 (36)	96 (36)	96 (36)	97 (36)	80 (27)	70 (21)	56 (13)	97 (36)
Mean maximum °F (°C)	43.9 (6.6)	46.4 (8.0)	56.7 (13.7)	72.8 (22.7)	84.2 (29.0)	90.6 (32.6)	89.8 (32.1)	88.8 (31.6)	84.2 (29.0)	74.1 (23.4)	61.4 (16.3)	50.2 (10.1)	92.9 (33.8)
Mean daily maximum °F (°C)	23.8 (−4.6)	28.2 (−2.1)	38.3 (3.5)	50.5 (10.3)	64.7 (18.2)	73.4 (23.0)	78.3 (25.7)	77.2 (25.1)	69.2 (20.7)	55.6 (13.1)	42.2 (5.7)	30.0 (−1.1)	52.6 (11.5)
Daily mean °F (°C)	13.3 (−10.4)	15.8 (−9.0)	26.1 (−3.3)	39.0 (3.9)	52.0 (11.1)	61.4 (16.3)	66.6 (19.2)	65.0 (18.3)	57.2 (14.0)	45.0 (7.2)	33.9 (1.1)	22.1 (−5.5)	41.4 (5.2)
Mean daily minimum °F (°C)	2.7 (−16.3)	3.4 (−15.9)	13.9 (−10.1)	27.5 (−2.5)	39.3 (4.1)	49.3 (9.6)	54.9 (12.7)	52.8 (11.6)	45.2 (7.3)	34.4 (1.3)	25.6 (−3.6)	14.3 (−9.8)	30.3 (−1.0)
Mean minimum °F (°C)	−21.5 (−29.7)	−19.6 (−28.7)	−12.1 (−24.5)	14.6 (−9.7)	25.6 (−3.6)	36.2 (2.3)	44.1 (6.7)	40.4 (4.7)	31.0 (−0.6)	20.1 (−6.6)	8.6 (−13.0)	−6.3 (−21.3)	−25.2 (−31.8)
Record low °F (°C)	−43 (−42)	−36 (−38)	−29 (−34)	4 (−16)	22 (−6)	29 (−2)	40 (4)	36 (2)	26 (−3)	14 (−10)	−2 (−19)	−19 (−28)	−43 (−42)
Average precipitation inches (mm)	3.57 (91)	3.17 (81)	3.63 (92)	4.01 (102)	3.75 (95)	4.44 (113)	4.00 (102)	3.82 (97)	4.03 (102)	5.15 (131)	4.39 (112)	4.50 (114)	48.46 (1,232)
Average snowfall inches (cm)	22.9 (58)	23.0 (58)	21.6 (55)	7.3 (19)	0.0 (0.0)	0.0 (0.0)	0.0 (0.0)	0.0 (0.0)	0.0 (0.0)	0.6 (1.5)	4.9 (12)	20.0 (51)	100.3 (254.5)
Source 1: NOAA
Source 2: XMACIS2 (temp records & monthly max/mins)

== Demographics ==
Historical population
Census	Pop.	Note	%±
1820	431		—
1830	906		110.2%
1840	1,116		23.2%
1850	1,223		9.6%
1860	1,152		−5.8%
1870	954		−17.2%
1880	876		−8.2%
1890	725		−17.2%
1900	593		−18.2%
1910	549		−7.4%
1920	464		−15.5%
1930	357		−23.1%
1940	372		4.2%
1950	442		18.8%
1960	384		−13.1%
1970	325		−15.4%
1980	469		44.3%
1990	554		18.1%
2000	612		10.5%
2010	630		2.9%
2020	665		5.6%
U.S. Decennial Census

=== 2010 census ===
As of the census of 2010, there were 630 people, 273 households, and 194 families living in the town. The population density was 17.1 inhabitants per square mile (6.6/km^{2}). There were 420 housing units at an average density of 11.4 per square mile (4.4/km^{2}). The racial makeup of the town was 97.6% White, 0.8% Native American, 0.2% Asian, and 1.4% from two or more races. Hispanic or Latino people of any race were 0.6% of the population.

There were 273 households, of which 24.9% had children under the age of 18 living with them, 60.4% were married couples living together, 6.2% had a female householder with no husband present, 4.4% had a male householder with no wife present, and 28.9% were non-families. 21.6% of all households were made up of individuals, and 8.5% had someone living alone who was 65 years of age or older. The average household size was 2.31 and the average family size was 2.65.

The median age in the town was 49.3 years. 17.3% of residents were under the age of 18; 3.9% were between the ages of 18 and 24; 21.9% were from 25 to 44; 37.5% were from 45 to 64; and 19.4% were 65 years of age or older. The gender makeup of the town was 49.2% male and 50.8% female.

=== 2000 census ===
As of the census of 2000, there were 612 people, 249 households, and 177 families living in the town. The population density was 16.5 people per square mile (6.4/km^{2}). There were 361 housing units at an average density of 9.8 per square mile (3.8/km^{2}). The racial makeup of the town was 98.20% White, 0.49% Native American, 0.16% Asian, 0.16% Pacific Islander, 0.33% from other races, and 0.65% from two or more races. Hispanic or Latino people of any race were 0.98% of the population.

There were 249 households, out of which 31.7% had children under the age of 18 living with them, 61.4% were married couples living together, 5.6% had a female householder with no husband present, and 28.9% were non-families. 23.7% of all households were made up of individuals, and 11.6% had someone living alone who was 65 years of age or older. The average household size was 2.46 and the average family size was 2.89.

In the town, the population was spread out, with 24.3% under the age of 18, 5.1% from 18 to 24, 21.2% from 25 to 44, 35.6% from 45 to 64, and 13.7% who were 65 years of age or older. The median age was 44 years. For every 100 females, there were 101.3 males. For every 100 females age 18 and over, there were 95.4 males.

The median income for a household in the town was $33,125, and the median income for a family was $38,125. Males had a median income of $32,000 versus $17,422 for females. The per capita income for the town was $13,495. About 6.4% of families and 7.5% of the population were below the poverty line, including 7.1% of those under age 18 and 12.5% of those age 65 or over.
