= Willimantic, Maine =

Town in Maine, United States

- Town
- Location in Piscataquis County and the state of Maine
- Coordinates: 45°18′11″N 69°22′47″W
- Country: United States
- State: Maine
- County: Piscataquis

Area
  - Total: 47.91 sq mi (124.09 km^{2})
  - Land: 43.18 sq mi (111.84 km^{2})
  - Water: 4.73 sq mi (12.25 km^{2})
- Elevation: 367 ft (112 m)

Population (2020)
  - Total: 134
  - Density: 3.1/sq mi (1.2/km^{2})
- Time zone: UTC-5 (Eastern (EST))
  - Summer (DST): UTC-4 (EDT)
- ZIP Code: 04443
- Area code: 207
- FIPS code: 23-85710
- GNIS feature ID: 0582815
- Website: www.willimanticme.com

Willimantic is a town in Piscataquis County, Maine, United States. The population was 134 according to the 2020 census.

== Name ==
The town was originally named Howard; after the Willimantic Linen Company erected a woodworking factory in 1879 to produce spools for thread, it was renamed in 1881 to Willimantic, after Willimantic, Connecticut. The name Willimantic was first rendered by English colonists as Waramanticut in 1684, and its origin is Algonquian (either Mohegan-Pequot or Narragansett). The meaning is uncertain, with one translation being "land of the swift running water," and another, "place near the evergreen swamp."

== Geography ==
According to the United States Census Bureau, the town has a total area of 47.91 square miles (124.09 km^{2}), of which 43.18 square miles (111.84 km^{2}) is land and 4.73 square miles (12.25 km^{2}) is water.

== Demographics ==
Historical population
Census	Pop.	Note	%±
1870	267		—
1890	446		—
1900	419		−6.1%
1910	271		−35.3%
1920	196		−27.7%
1930	173		−11.7%
1940	188		8.7%
1950	189		0.5%
1960	137		−27.5%
1970	126		−8.0%
1980	164		30.2%
1990	170		3.7%
2000	135		−20.6%
2010	150		11.1%
2020	134		−10.7%
U.S. Decennial Census

=== 2010 census ===
As of the census of 2010, there were 150 people, 69 households, and 43 families living in the town. The population density was 3.5 inhabitants per square mile (1.4/km^{2}). There were 298 housing units at an average density of 6.9 per square mile (2.7/km^{2}). The racial makeup of the town was 98.0% White, 1.3% Native American, and 0.7% from two or more races.

There were 69 households, of which 15.9% had children under the age of 18 living with them, 55.1% were married couples living together, 2.9% had a female householder with no husband present, 4.3% had a male householder with no wife present, and 37.7% were non-families. 29.0% of all households were made up of individuals, and 10.1% had someone living alone who was 65 years of age or older. The average household size was 2.17 and the average family size was 2.72.

The median age in the town was 52 years. 17.3% of residents were under the age of 18; 4.7% were between the ages of 18 and 24; 12.7% were from 25 to 44; 42.7% were from 45 to 64; and 22.7% were 65 years of age or older. The gender makeup of the town was 49.3% male and 50.7% female.

=== 2000 census ===
As of the census of 2000, there were 135 people, 55 households, and 39 families living in the town. The population density was 3.1 people per square mile (1.2/km^{2}). There were 225 housing units at an average density of 5.2 per square mile (2.0/km^{2}). The racial makeup of the town was 91.11% White, 3.70% Native American, 1.48% from other races, and 3.70% from two or more races. Hispanic or Latino people of any race were 1.48% of the population.

There were 55 households, out of which 27.3% had children under the age of 18 living with them, 60.0% were married couples living together, 7.3% had a female householder with no husband present, and 27.3% were non-families. 21.8% of all households were made up of individuals, and 10.9% had someone living alone who was 65 years of age or older. The average household size was 2.45 and the average family size was 2.90.

In the town, the population was spread out, with 25.2% under the age of 18, 3.7% from 18 to 24, 21.5% from 25 to 44, 32.6% from 45 to 64, and 17.0% who were 65 years of age or older. The median age was 45 years. For every 100 females, there were 117.7 males. For every 100 females age 18 and over, there were 110.4 males.

The median income for a household in the town was $26,250, and the median income for a family was $29,375. Males had a median income of $40,000 versus $33,125 for females. The per capita income for the town was $14,206. There were 20.0% of families and 26.6% of the population living below the poverty line, including 39.3% of under eighteens and 57.1% of those over 64.
