= Mount Kineo =

Mountain in Maine, United States

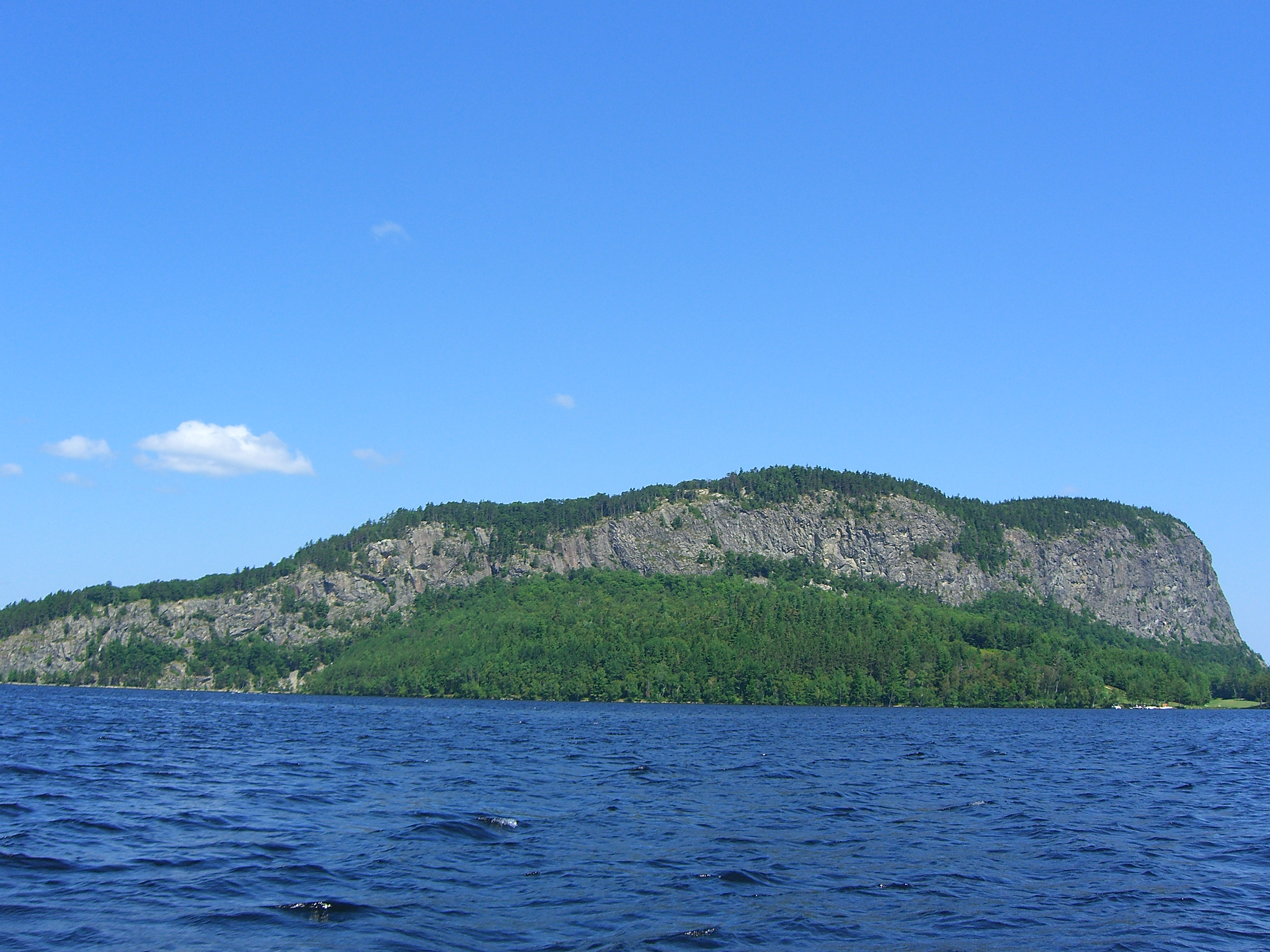

Highest point
- Elevation: 1,789 ft (545 m)
- Prominence: 750 ft (230 m)
- Listing: List of mountains of Maine
- Coordinates: 45°41′59″N 69°44′02″W

Geography
- Location within Maine
- Location: Piscataquis County, Maine, U.S.
- Topo map: USGS Mount Kineo

Mount Kineo is a prominent geological feature located on a 1,150-acre (470 ha) peninsula that extends from the easterly shore of Moosehead Lake in the northern forest of Maine. With 700-foot (210 m) cliffs rising straight up from the water, it is the central feature of Mount Kineo State Park, a protected area of 800 acres (320 ha) managed by the Maine Department of Agriculture, Conservation and Forestry.

== History ==
Native American

Native Americans once traveled great distances to Mt. Kineo to acquire its rhyolite rock. This rhyolite is evidence of an igneous (volcanic) phase although the mountain formations also contain slate and sandstone demonstrating sedimentary and metaphoric history as well. The mechanical properties of the rhyolite on Mount Kineo exhibits the physical properties of flint and was used extensively by indigenous peoples to make arrowheads and implements and thus, has often been referred to as "Kineo flint" in literature; but this term misleads by implication that the rhyolite is a cryptocrystalline form of the mineral quartz derived from a sedimentary origin. The rhyolite is actually an igneous extrusive material implying a volcanic phase that created the unique properties of this highly sought after material. Being the country's largest known mass of this rock, once used by Indigenous people to craft arrowheads, hatchets, chisels, etc., Indigenous implements made from the stone have been found in all parts of New England and even further south, it is evident that various tribes visited Mt. Kineo for centuries to obtain this material.

Notable visitors

In 1846, Henry David Thoreau visited the Moosehead Lake region, and the mountain's geological formation, Indian relics and traditions deeply interested him.

Hotel resort

The first Mt. Kineo House was built on the shores of Moosehead Lake in 1848, but burned in 1868. Rebuilt in 1870 and opened in 1871, the second Mt. Kineo House burned again in 1882. Designed by Arthur H. Vinal, the third Mt. Kineo House opened in 1884.

In 1911, the Maine Central Railroad purchased the resort and engaged the Hiram Ricker Hotel Company to operate it. Then the largest inland waterfront hotel in America, it had accommodations for over 500 guests. In 1933, the railroad eliminated its Kineo branch, and in 1938 sold the hotel. It burned during demolition and the old employee house was burned down in 2018.

== Gallery ==
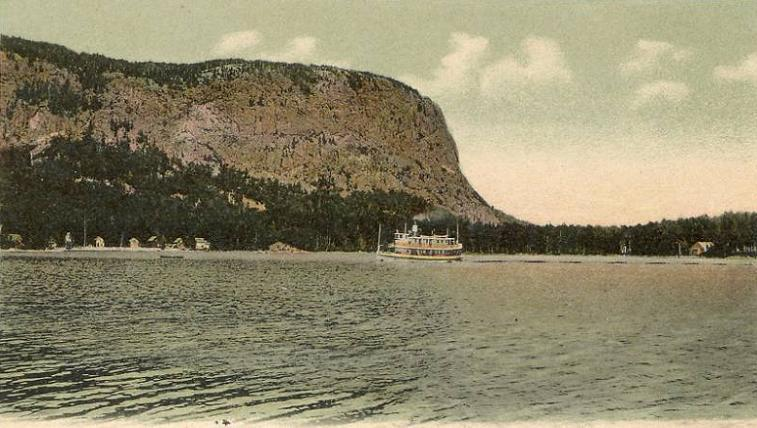
Steamer arriving at Mt. Kineo in 1906

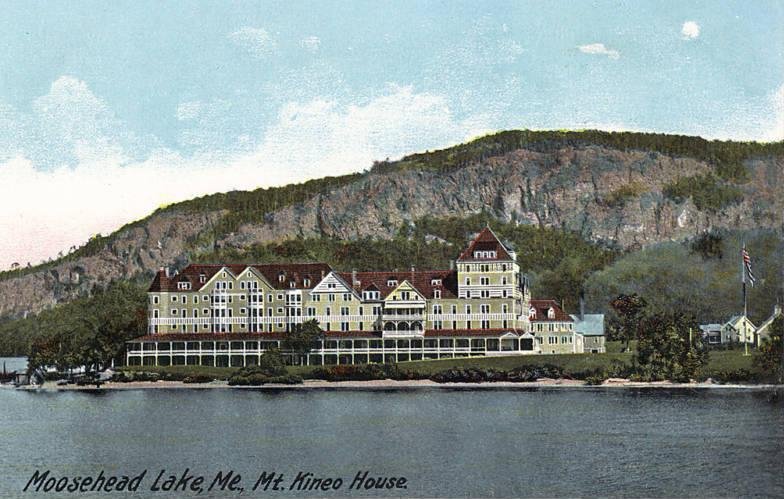
The Mt. Kineo House in 1908

== Features ==
State park

The state park offers various trails around the peninsula and to the mountain peak. The park can only be reached by water. The Mount Kineo Golf Course operates the seasonal water shuttle service from the public dock in Rockwood to Mount Kineo. The park is one of five Maine State Parks that was in the path of totality for the 2024 solar eclipse, with 3 minutes and 24 seconds of totality.

Golf course

Mount Kineo Golf Course is believed to be the second oldest in New England. It came under new ownership in 2009. Played on the original 1893 course, the classic lakeside layout has no sand traps, small greens, and the Kineo cliff as a backdrop for the scenic over-the-water par 3 hole #4.
