= List of municipalities in Maine =

Municipalities of Maine
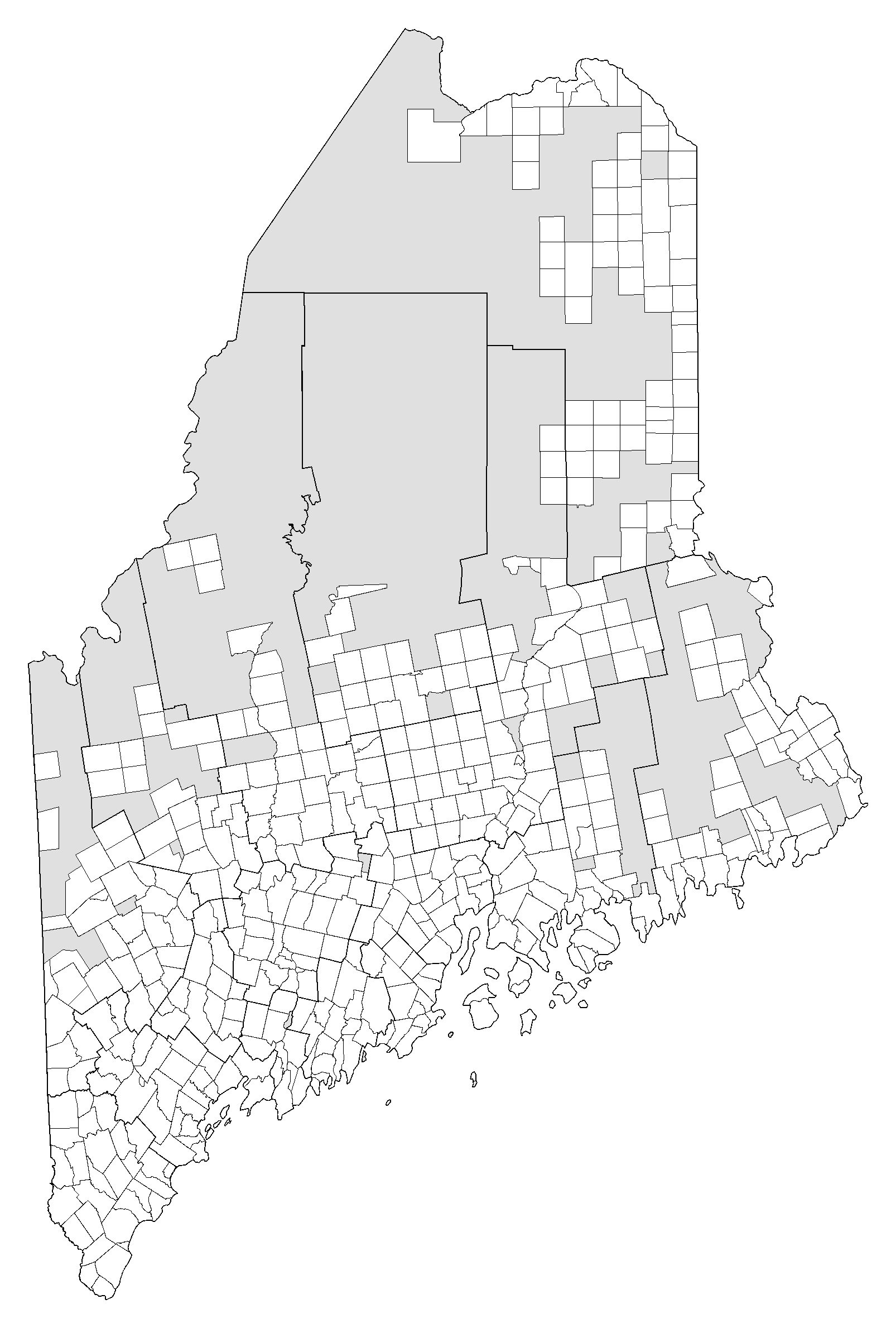
- Category: Municipality
- Location: State of Maine
- Found in: County
- Created: 1647 (Kittery)
- Number: 482
- Possible types: City; Town; Plantation
- Populations: 5 (Glenwood Plantation) – 68,408 (Portland)
- Areas: 0.9 square miles (2.3 km^{2}) (Monhegan) – 128.6 square miles (333 km^{2}) (Allagash)
- Government: Council–manager; Town meeting; Mayor–council; Select Board
- Subdivisions: Village; Neighborhood

Maine is a state located in the Northeastern United States. According to the 2020 United States census, Maine is the 9th least populous state, with 1,372,247 inhabitants, and the 12th smallest by land area, spanning 30,842.92 square miles (79,882.8 km^{2}). Maine is divided into 16 counties and contains 482 municipalities consisting of cities, towns, and plantations. In Maine, a plantation is an organized form of municipal self-government similar to but with less power than a town or a city. One difference is that plantations cannot make local ordinances. Unlike towns or cities, with few exceptions, this type of municipality usually includes the word Plantation as part of its full name, which is also commonly used locally.

As of 2023, Maine has 23 cities, 430 towns, and 29 plantations:

== List of municipalities ==
| Municipality | Type | County | Population (2020) | Land area | | Year incorporated |
| Municipality | Type | County | Population (2020) | sq mi | km^{2} | Year incorporated |
|---|---|---|---|---|---|---|
| Portland | City | Cumberland (seat) | 68,408 | 21.6 | 56 | 1786 |
| Lewiston | City | Androscoggin | 37,121 | 34.2 | 89 | 1795 |
| Bangor | City | Penobscot (seat) | 31,753 | 34.3 | 89 | 1834 |
| South Portland | City | Cumberland | 26,498 | 12.1 | 31 | 1895 |
| Auburn | City | Androscoggin (seat) | 24,061 | 59.3 | 154 | 1842 |
| Biddeford | City | York | 22,552 | 30.1 | 78 | 1653 |
| Scarborough | Town | Cumberland | 22,135 | 47.6 | 123 | 1658 |
| Sanford | City | York | 21,982 | 47.8 | 124 | 1768 |
| Brunswick | Town | Cumberland | 21,756 | 46.7 | 121 | 1739 |
| Westbrook | City | Cumberland | 20,400 | 17.2 | 45 | 1814 |
| Saco | City | York | 20,381 | 38.6 | 100 | 1775 |
| Augusta | City (capital) | Kennebec (seat) | 18,899 | 55.2 | 143 | 1797 |
| Windham | Town | Cumberland | 18,434 | 46.6 | 121 | 1762 |
| Gorham | Town | Cumberland | 18,336 | 50.6 | 131 | 1764 |
| Waterville | City | Kennebec | 15,828 | 13.5 | 35 | 1802 |
| York | Town | York | 13,723 | 54.7 | 142 | 1652 |
| Falmouth | Town | Cumberland | 12,444 | 29.4 | 76 | 1718 |
| Kennebunk | Town | York | 11,536 | 35.1 | 91 | 1820 |
| Wells | Town | York | 11,314 | 57.6 | 149 | 1653 |
| Orono | Town | Penobscot | 11,183 | 18.2 | 47 | 1806 |
| Standish | Town | Cumberland | 10,244 | 59.0 | 153 | 1785 |
| Kittery | Town | York | 10,070 | 17.8 | 46 | 1647 |
| Lisbon | Town | Androscoggin | 9,711 | 22.8 | 59 | 1799 |
| Brewer | City | Penobscot | 9,672 | 15.2 | 39 | 1812 |
| Topsham | Town | Sagadahoc | 9,560 | 32.2 | 83 | 1764 |
| Cape Elizabeth | Town | Cumberland | 9,535 | 14.7 | 38 | 1765 |
| Yarmouth | Town | Cumberland | 8,990 | 13.3 | 34 | 1849 |
| Old Orchard Beach | Town | York | 8,960 | 7.4 | 19 | 1883 |
| Presque Isle | City | Aroostook | 8,797 | 75.8 | 196 | 1859 |
| Bath | City | Sagadahoc (seat) | 8,766 | 9.1 | 24 | 1781 |
| Freeport | Town | Cumberland | 8,737 | 34.7 | 90 | 1789 |
| Skowhegan | Town | Somerset (seat) | 8,620 | 58.9 | 153 | 1823 |
| Cumberland | Town | Cumberland | 8,473 | 22.9 | 59 | 1821 |
| Ellsworth | City | Hancock (seat) | 8,399 | 79.3 | 205 | 1800 |
| Buxton | Town | York | 8,376 | 52.2 | 135 | 1772 |
| Gray | Town | Cumberland | 8,269 | 43.3 | 112 | 1788 |
| Berwick | Town | York | 7,950 | 37.5 | 97 | 1713 |
| Winslow | Town | Kennebec | 7,948 | 36.8 | 95 | 1771 |
| Waterboro | Town | York | 7,936 | 55.3 | 143 | 1787 |
| Hampden | Town | Penobscot | 7,709 | 37.9 | 98 | 1794 |
| Farmington | Town | Franklin (seat) | 7,592 | 55.7 | 144 | 1794 |
| South Berwick | Town | York | 7,467 | 32.1 | 83 | 1814 |
| Old Town | City | Penobscot | 7,431 | 38.8 | 100 | 1840 |
| Caribou | City | Aroostook | 7,396 | 79.3 | 205 | 1859 |
| Belfast | City | Waldo (seat) | 6,938 | 12.8 | 33 | 1773 |
| Rockland | City | Knox (seat) | 6,936 | 34.0 | 88 | 1848 |
| Eliot | Town | York | 6,717 | 19.8 | 51 | 1810 |
| Fairfield | Town | Somerset | 6,484 | 53.8 | 139 | 1788 |
| Lebanon | Town | York | 6,469 | 55.0 | 142 | 1767 |
| Hermon | Town | Penobscot | 6,461 | 35.9 | 93 | 1814 |
| Oakland | Town | Kennebec | 6,230 | 25.7 | 67 | 1873 |
| Winthrop | Town | Kennebec | 6,121 | 31.2 | 81 | 1771 |
| Houlton | Town | Aroostook (seat) | 6,055 | 36.7 | 95 | 1831 |
| Gardiner | City | Kennebec | 5,961 | 15.7 | 41 | 1803 |
| Poland | Town | Androscoggin | 5,906 | 42.2 | 109 | 1795 |
| Rumford | Town | Oxford | 5,858 | 68.6 | 178 | 1800 |
| Turner | Town | Androscoggin | 5,817 | 59.3 | 154 | 1786 |
| New Gloucester | Town | Cumberland | 5,676 | 47.1 | 122 | 1774 |
| Bridgton | Town | Cumberland | 5,418 | 56.8 | 147 | 1794 |
| Camden | Town | Knox | 5,232 | 18.2 | 47 | 1791 |
| Paris | Town | Oxford (seat) | 5,179 | 40.8 | 106 | 1793 |
| Waldoboro | Town | Lincoln | 5,154 | 71.5 | 185 | 1773 |
| Bar Harbor | Town | Hancock | 5,098 | 42.2 | 109 | 1796 |
| Norway | Town | Oxford | 5,077 | 45.0 | 117 | 1797 |
| Sabattus | Town | Androscoggin | 5,044 | 25.7 | 67 | 1840 |
| Harpswell | Town | Cumberland | 5,031 | 24.2 | 63 | 1775 |
| North Berwick | Town | York | 4,978 | 38.0 | 98 | 1831 |
| Bucksport | Town | Hancock | 4,944 | 51.5 | 133 | 1792 |
| Warren | Town | Knox | 4,865 | 46.5 | 120 | 1776 |
| Lincoln | Town | Penobscot | 4,853 | 67.8 | 176 | 1829 |
| Hollis | Town | York | 4,745 | 32.0 | 83 | 1798 |
| Madison | Town | Somerset | 4,726 | 51.9 | 134 | 1804 |
| Glenburn | Town | Penobscot | 4,648 | 27.2 | 70 | 1822 |
| Sidney | Town | Kennebec | 4,645 | 42.3 | 110 | 1792 |
| Jay | Town | Franklin | 4,620 | 48.4 | 125 | 1795 |
| Raymond | Town | Cumberland | 4,536 | 33.2 | 86 | 1803 |
| Lyman | Town | York | 4,525 | 39.0 | 101 | 1778 |
| Vassalboro | Town | Kennebec | 4,520 | 44.3 | 115 | 1771 |
| Dover-Foxcroft | Town | Piscataquis (seat) | 4,422 | 67.8 | 176 | 1822 |
| China | Town | Kennebec | 4,408 | 49.9 | 129 | 1818 |
| Greene | Town | Androscoggin | 4,376 | 32.3 | 84 | 1788 |
| Arundel | Town | York | 4,264 | 23.9 | 62 | 1915 |
| Oxford | Town | Oxford | 4,229 | 38.7 | 100 | 1829 |
| Durham | Town | Androscoggin | 4,173 | 38.3 | 99 | 1789 |
| Millinocket | Town | Penobscot | 4,114 | 16.0 | 41 | 1901 |
| North Yarmouth | Town | Cumberland | 4,072 | 21.2 | 55 | 1680 |
| Fort Kent | Town | Aroostook | 4,067 | 54.2 | 140 | 1869 |
| Monmouth | Town | Kennebec | 4,066 | 34.0 | 88 | 1792 |
| Naples | Town | Cumberland | 3,925 | 31.8 | 82 | 1834 |
| Pittsfield | Town | Somerset | 3,908 | 48.2 | 125 | 1819 |
| Limington | Town | York | 3,892 | 41.9 | 109 | 1792 |
| Madawaska | Town | Aroostook | 3,867 | 55.6 | 144 | 1831 |
| Wilton | Town | Franklin | 3,835 | 41.3 | 107 | 1803 |
| Winterport | Town | Waldo | 3,817 | 35.5 | 92 | 1860 |
| Orrington | Town | Penobscot | 3,812 | 25.0 | 65 | 1788 |
| Dexter | Town | Penobscot | 3,803 | 35.1 | 91 | 1816 |
| Wiscasset | Town | Lincoln (seat) | 3,742 | 24.6 | 64 | 1760 |
| West Gardiner | Town | Kennebec | 3,671 | 24.6 | 64 | 1850 |
| Casco | Town | Cumberland | 3,646 | 31.2 | 81 | 1841 |
| Rockport | Town | Knox | 3,644 | 21.6 | 56 | 1891 |
| Kennebunkport | Town | York | 3,629 | 18.6 | 48 | 1653 |
| Litchfield | Town | Kennebec | 3,586 | 37.4 | 97 | 1795 |
| Richmond | Town | Sagadahoc | 3,522 | 30.4 | 79 | 1823 |
| Clinton | Town | Kennebec | 3,370 | 43.9 | 114 | 1795 |
| Fryeburg | Town | Oxford | 3,369 | 58.3 | 151 | 1777 |
| Fort Fairfield | Town | Aroostook | 3,322 | 76.7 | 199 | 1858 |
| Norridgewock | Town | Somerset | 3,278 | 50.0 | 129 | 1788 |
| Holden | Town | Penobscot | 3,277 | 31.3 | 81 | 1852 |
| Belgrade | Town | Kennebec | 3,250 | 43.2 | 112 | 1796 |
| Limerick | Town | York | 3,188 | 27.1 | 70 | 1787 |
| Bowdoin | Town | Sagadahoc | 3,136 | 43.5 | 113 | 1788 |
| Newport | Town | Penobscot | 3,133 | 29.5 | 76 | 1814 |
| Mechanic Falls | Town | Androscoggin | 3,107 | 11.0 | 28 | 1893 |
| Calais | City | Washington | 3,079 | 34.3 | 89 | 1809 |
| Alfred | Town | York (seat) | 3,073 | 27.3 | 71 | 1794 |
| Milford | Town | Penobscot | 3,069 | 45.6 | 118 | 1833 |
| Woolwich | Town | Sagadahoc | 3,068 | 35.1 | 91 | 1775 |
| Livermore Falls | Town | Androscoggin | 3,060 | 19.7 | 51 | 1844 |
| Bowdoinham | Town | Sagadahoc | 3,047 | 34.4 | 89 | 1762 |
| Boothbay | Town | Lincoln | 3,003 | 21.9 | 57 | 1764 |
| Farmingdale | Town | Kennebec | 2,995 | 11.2 | 29 | 1852 |
| Levant | Town | Penobscot | 2,940 | 30.1 | 78 | 1813 |
| Shapleigh | Town | York | 2,921 | 38.8 | 100 | 1785 |
| Corinth | Town | Penobscot | 2,900 | 40.3 | 104 | 1811 |
| Pittston | Town | Kennebec | 2,875 | 32.2 | 83 | 1779 |
| Carmel | Town | Penobscot | 2,867 | 36.5 | 95 | 1811 |
| Bristol | Town | Lincoln | 2,834 | 34.0 | 88 | 1765 |
| Blue Hill | Town | Hancock | 2,792 | 62.5 | 162 | 1789 |
| Chelsea | Town | Kennebec | 2,778 | 19.5 | 51 | 1851 |
| Mexico | Town | Oxford | 2,756 | 23.3 | 60 | 1818 |
| Thomaston | Town | Knox | 2,739 | 10.9 | 28 | 1777 |
| Benton | Town | Kennebec | 2,715 | 28.4 | 74 | 1842 |
| Acton | Town | York | 2,671 | 37.7 | 98 | 1830 |
| Searsport | Town | Waldo | 2,649 | 28.7 | 74 | 1845 |
| Windsor | Town | Kennebec | 2,632 | 34.7 | 90 | 1809 |
| Readfield | Town | Kennebec | 2,597 | 29.2 | 76 | 1791 |
| St. George | Town | Knox | 2,594 | 25.0 | 65 | 1803 |
| Hallowell | City | Kennebec | 2,570 | 5.9 | 15 | 1771 |
| Jefferson | Town | Lincoln | 2,551 | 52.6 | 136 | 1807 |
| Bethel | Town | Oxford | 2,504 | 64.6 | 167 | 1796 |
| Hancock | Town | Hancock | 2,466 | 30.0 | 78 | 1828 |
| Manchester | Town | Kennebec | 2,456 | 21.4 | 55 | 1850 |
| Harrison | Town | Cumberland | 2,447 | 33.1 | 86 | 1805 |
| Whitefield | Town | Lincoln | 2,408 | 46.8 | 121 | 1809 |
| Union | Town | Knox | 2,383 | 32.2 | 83 | 1786 |
| Lincolnville | Town | Waldo | 2,312 | 37.3 | 97 | 1802 |
| Damariscotta | Town | Lincoln | 2,297 | 12.4 | 32 | 1848 |
| Unity | Town | Waldo | 2,292 | 39.4 | 102 | 1804 |
| Anson | Town | Somerset | 2,291 | 47.5 | 123 | 1798 |
| Leeds | Town | Androscoggin | 2,262 | 40.1 | 104 | 1801 |
| Dixfield | Town | Oxford | 2,253 | 41.3 | 107 | 1803 |
| Minot | Town | Androscoggin | 2,251 | 29.6 | 77 | 1802 |
| Milo | Town | Piscataquis | 2,251 | 33.0 | 85 | 1823 |
| Orland | Town | Hancock | 2,221 | 47.0 | 122 | 1800 |
| Corinna | Town | Penobscot | 2,221 | 38.7 | 100 | 1816 |
| Eddington | Town | Penobscot | 2,194 | 25.0 | 65 | 1811 |
| Deer Isle | Town | Hancock | 2,194 | 29.7 | 77 | 1789 |
| Canaan | Town | Somerset | 2,193 | 41.2 | 107 | 1788 |
| Phippsburg | Town | Sagadahoc | 2,155 | 28.6 | 74 | 1814 |
| Mount Desert | Town | Hancock | 2,146 | 36.9 | 96 | 1789 |
| Dayton | Town | York | 2,129 | 17.9 | 46 | 1854 |
| Livermore | Town | Androscoggin | 2,127 | 37.6 | 97 | 1795 |
| Machias | Town | Washington (seat) | 2,060 | 13.9 | 36 | 1784 |
| St. Albans | Town | Somerset | 2,045 | 44.8 | 116 | 1813 |
| Van Buren | Town | Aroostook | 2,038 | 33.8 | 88 | 1881 |
| Boothbay Harbor | Town | Lincoln | 2,027 | 5.7 | 15 | 1889 |
| Albion | Town | Kennebec | 2,006 | 38.8 | 100 | 1804 |
| Buckfield | Town | Oxford | 1,983 | 37.5 | 97 | 1793 |
| Palmyra | Town | Somerset | 1,924 | 40.2 | 104 | 1807 |
| Sebago | Town | Cumberland | 1,911 | 32.8 | 85 | 1826 |
| West Bath | Town | Sagadahoc | 1,910 | 11.8 | 31 | 1844 |
| Mapleton | Town | Aroostook | 1,886 | 34.0 | 88 | 1880 |
| Otisfield | Town | Oxford | 1,853 | 39.9 | 103 | 1798 |
| Newcastle | Town | Lincoln | 1,848 | 29.1 | 75 | 1775 |
| Veazie | Town | Penobscot | 1,814 | 3.0 | 7.8 | 1853 |
| Parsonsfield | Town | York | 1,791 | 58.9 | 153 | 1785 |
| Nobleboro | Town | Lincoln | 1,791 | 18.9 | 49 | 1788 |
| West Paris | Town | Oxford | 1,766 | 24.2 | 63 | 1957 |
| Southwest Harbor | Town | Hancock | 1,756 | 13.5 | 35 | 1905 |
| Randolph | Town | Kennebec | 1,743 | 2.1 | 5.4 | 1887 |
| Dresden | Town | Lincoln | 1,725 | 30.5 | 79 | 1794 |
| Mount Vernon | Town | Kennebec | 1,721 | 37.9 | 98 | 1792 |
| Lamoine | Town | Hancock | 1,720 | 17.8 | 46 | 1870 |
| Hartland | Town | Somerset | 1,705 | 37.1 | 96 | 1820 |
| Gouldsboro | Town | Hancock | 1,703 | 52.8 | 137 | 1789 |
| Hope | Town | Knox | 1,698 | 22.0 | 57 | 1804 |
| Newfield | Town | York | 1,648 | 32.3 | 84 | 1794 |
| Dedham | Town | Hancock | 1,648 | 39.3 | 102 | 1837 |
| Brownfield | Town | Oxford | 1,631 | 44.5 | 115 | 1802 |
| Surry | Town | Hancock | 1,623 | 37.0 | 96 | 1803 |
| Hiram | Town | Oxford | 1,609 | 37.6 | 97 | 1814 |
| Wales | Town | Androscoggin | 1,608 | 16.0 | 41 | 1816 |
| Porter | Town | Oxford | 1,600 | 31.5 | 82 | 1807 |
| Newburgh | Town | Penobscot | 1,595 | 31.0 | 80 | 1819 |
| Washington | Town | Knox | 1,592 | 38.0 | 98 | 1811 |
| Trenton | Town | Hancock | 1,584 | 18.1 | 47 | 1789 |
| Ogunquit | Town | York | 1,577 | 4.2 | 11 | 1980 |
| East Millinocket | Town | Penobscot | 1,572 | 7.1 | 18 | 1907 |
| Waterford | Town | Oxford | 1,570 | 50.2 | 130 | 1797 |
| Palermo | Town | Waldo | 1,570 | 40.5 | 105 | 1804 |
| Franklin | Town | Hancock | 1,567 | 36.5 | 95 | 1825 |
| Pownal | Town | Cumberland | 1,566 | 22.9 | 59 | 1808 |
| Charleston | Town | Penobscot | 1,551 | 40.6 | 105 | 1811 |
| Northport | Town | Waldo | 1,550 | 23.8 | 62 | 1796 |
| Tremont | Town | Hancock | 1,544 | 16.8 | 44 | 1848 |
| Stockton Springs | Town | Waldo | 1,533 | 19.6 | 51 | 1857 |
| Bradley | Town | Penobscot | 1,532 | 49.5 | 128 | 1835 |
| Washburn | Town | Aroostook | 1,527 | 34.2 | 89 | 1861 |
| Limestone | Town | Aroostook | 1,526 | 40.5 | 105 | 1855 |
| Baldwin | Town | Cumberland | 1,520 | 35.3 | 91 | 1802 |
| South Thomaston | Town | Knox | 1,511 | 11.4 | 30 | 1848 |
| Cornish | Town | York | 1,508 | 22.2 | 57 | 1794 |
| Owls Head | Town | Knox | 1,504 | 8.9 | 23 | 1921 |
| Cushing | Town | Knox | 1,502 | 19.2 | 50 | 1789 |
| Peru | Town | Oxford | 1,488 | 46.7 | 121 | 1821 |
| New Sharon | Town | Franklin | 1,458 | 46.2 | 120 | 1794 |
| Greenbush | Town | Penobscot | 1,444 | 43.8 | 113 | 1834 |
| Greenville | Town | Piscataquis | 1,437 | 42.3 | 110 | 1836 |
| Enfield | Town | Penobscot | 1,435 | 27.7 | 72 | 1835 |
| Hudson | Town | Penobscot | 1,416 | 37.6 | 97 | 1824 |
| Appleton | Town | Knox | 1,411 | 32.7 | 85 | 1829 |
| Searsmont | Town | Waldo | 1,400 | 37.7 | 98 | 1814 |
| Swanville | Town | Waldo | 1,377 | 19.7 | 51 | 1818 |
| Milbridge | Town | Washington | 1,375 | 24.3 | 63 | 1848 |
| Mars Hill | Town | Aroostook | 1,360 | 35.1 | 91 | 1867 |
| Woodstock | Town | Oxford | 1,352 | 45.7 | 118 | 1815 |
| Kenduskeag | Town | Penobscot | 1,346 | 16.8 | 44 | 1852 |
| Chesterville | Town | Franklin | 1,328 | 36.2 | 94 | 1802 |
| East Machias | Town | Washington | 1,326 | 34.8 | 90 | 1826 |
| Plymouth | Town | Penobscot | 1,325 | 29.7 | 77 | 1826 |
| Easton | Town | Aroostook | 1,320 | 38.7 | 100 | 1865 |
| Castine | Town | Hancock | 1,320 | 7.8 | 20 | 1796 |
| Baileyville | Town | Washington | 1,318 | 37.2 | 96 | 1828 |
| Cornville | Town | Somerset | 1,317 | 40.7 | 105 | 1798 |
| Sangerville | Town | Piscataquis | 1,306 | 38.4 | 99 | 1814 |
| Hodgdon | Town | Aroostook | 1,290 | 39.8 | 103 | 1821 |
| Eastport | City | Washington | 1,288 | 3.6 | 9.3 | 1798 |
| Vinalhaven | Town | Knox | 1,279 | 23.5 | 61 | 1789 |
| Guilford | Town | Piscataquis | 1,267 | 34.9 | 90 | 1816 |
| Jonesport | Town | Washington | 1,245 | 28.5 | 74 | 1832 |
| Lubec | Town | Washington | 1,237 | 33.3 | 86 | 1811 |
| Frankfort | Town | Waldo | 1,231 | 24.6 | 64 | 1789 |
| Etna | Town | Penobscot | 1,226 | 24.8 | 64 | 1820 |
| Hebron | Town | Oxford | 1,223 | 22.4 | 58 | 1792 |
| Rangeley | Town | Franklin | 1,222 | 41.5 | 107 | 1855 |
| Sullivan | Town | Hancock | 1,219 | 26.7 | 69 | 1789 |
| Woodland | Town | Aroostook | 1,217 | 35.3 | 91 | 1880 |
| Dixmont | Town | Penobscot | 1,211 | 36.3 | 94 | 1807 |
| Hartford | Town | Oxford | 1,203 | 43.9 | 114 | 1798 |
| Sedgwick | Town | Hancock | 1,202 | 27.0 | 70 | 1789 |
| Ashland | Town | Aroostook | 1,202 | 80.4 | 208 | 1862 |
| Denmark | Town | Oxford | 1,197 | 46.1 | 119 | 1807 |
| Edgecomb | Town | Lincoln | 1,188 | 18.1 | 47 | 1774 |
| Medway | Town | Penobscot | 1,187 | 41.0 | 106 | 1875 |
| Stetson | Town | Penobscot | 1,186 | 35.0 | 91 | 1831 |
| Bradford | Town | Penobscot | 1,184 | 41.2 | 107 | 1820 |
| Fayette | Town | Kennebec | 1,160 | 29.2 | 76 | 1795 |
| Rome | Town | Kennebec | 1,148 | 25.4 | 66 | 1804 |
| Addison | Town | Washington | 1,148 | 42.4 | 110 | 1797 |
| Friendship | Town | Knox | 1,142 | 14.1 | 37 | 1807 |
| Brownville | Town | Piscataquis | 1,139 | 44.0 | 114 | 1824 |
| Penobscot | Town | Hancock | 1,136 | 39.9 | 103 | 1787 |
| Wayne | Town | Kennebec | 1,129 | 19.3 | 50 | 1798 |
| Steuben | Town | Washington | 1,129 | 43.0 | 111 | 1795 |
| South Bristol | Town | Lincoln | 1,127 | 13.1 | 34 | 1915 |
| Canton | Town | Oxford | 1,125 | 29.1 | 75 | 1821 |
| Strong | Town | Franklin | 1,122 | 28.4 | 74 | 1801 |
| Cherryfield | Town | Washington | 1,107 | 44.4 | 115 | 1816 |
| Lovell | Town | Oxford | 1,104 | 43.2 | 112 | 1800 |
| Burnham | Town | Waldo | 1,096 | 38.9 | 101 | 1824 |
| Howland | Town | Penobscot | 1,094 | 34.9 | 90 | 1826 |
| Georgetown | Town | Sagadahoc | 1,058 | 18.6 | 48 | 1716 |
| Stonington | Town | Hancock | 1,056 | 9.8 | 25 | 1897 |
| Frenchville | Town | Aroostook | 1,052 | 28.7 | 74 | 1869 |
| Garland | Town | Penobscot | 1,026 | 37.7 | 98 | 1811 |
| Montville | Town | Waldo | 1,020 | 42.7 | 111 | 1807 |
| Troy | Town | Waldo | 1,018 | 34.9 | 90 | 1812 |
| Brooks | Town | Waldo | 1,010 | 24.7 | 64 | 1816 |
| Littleton | Town | Aroostook | 997 | 38.4 | 99 | 1856 |
| Sumner | Town | Oxford | 994 | 44.3 | 115 | 1798 |
| Solon | Town | Somerset | 978 | 39.7 | 103 | 1809 |
| Belmont | Town | Waldo | 976 | 13.6 | 35 | 1814 |
| Morrill | Town | Waldo | 971 | 16.6 | 43 | 1855 |
| Exeter | Town | Penobscot | 963 | 38.6 | 100 | 1811 |
| Machiasport | Town | Washington | 962 | 21.4 | 55 | 1826 |
| Harrington | Town | Washington | 962 | 21.1 | 55 | 1797 |
| Kingfield | Town | Franklin | 960 | 43.1 | 112 | 1816 |
| Athens | Town | Somerset | 952 | 43.6 | 113 | 1804 |
| Linneus | Town | Aroostook | 947 | 44.3 | 115 | 1836 |
| Brooksville | Town | Hancock | 935 | 31.1 | 81 | 1817 |
| Liberty | Town | Waldo | 934 | 26.0 | 67 | 1827 |
| Monroe | Town | Waldo | 931 | 38.9 | 101 | 1818 |
| Smithfield | Town | Somerset | 925 | 19.9 | 52 | 1840 |
| Lee | Town | Penobscot | 916 | 38.7 | 100 | 1832 |
| Embden | Town | Somerset | 902 | 39.6 | 103 | 1804 |
| Phillips | Town | Franklin | 898 | 50.8 | 132 | 1812 |
| Detroit | Town | Somerset | 885 | 20.3 | 53 | 1828 |
| Patten | Town | Penobscot | 881 | 38.2 | 99 | 1841 |
| Bingham | Town | Somerset | 866 | 34.9 | 90 | 1812 |
| Clifton | Town | Penobscot | 840 | 34.5 | 89 | 1848 |
| Alton | Town | Penobscot | 829 | 42.3 | 110 | 1844 |
| Brooklin | Town | Hancock | 827 | 17.9 | 46 | 1849 |
| Harmony | Town | Somerset | 825 | 38.7 | 100 | 1803 |
| Bremen | Town | Lincoln | 823 | 16.5 | 43 | 1828 |
| Sherman | Town | Aroostook | 815 | 40 | 100 | 1862 |
| Knox | Town | Waldo | 811 | 29.0 | 75 | 1819 |
| Perry | Town | Washington | 802 | 29.3 | 76 | 1818 |
| Waldo | Town | Waldo | 795 | 19.3 | 50 | 1845 |
| Pembroke | Town | Washington | 788 | 27.4 | 71 | 1832 |
| Industry | Town | Franklin | 788 | 29.8 | 77 | 1803 |
| Jackman | Town | Somerset | 782 | 41.3 | 107 | 1895 |
| Thorndike | Town | Waldo | 774 | 25.3 | 66 | 1819 |
| Greenwood | Town | Oxford | 774 | 41.7 | 108 | 1816 |
| Eagle Lake | Town | Aroostook | 772 | 37.4 | 97 | 1859 |
| New Portland | Town | Somerset | 765 | 43.9 | 114 | 1808 |
| Island Falls | Town | Aroostook | 758 | 36.0 | 93 | 1872 |
| Andover | Town | Oxford | 752 | 57.4 | 149 | 1804 |
| Parkman | Town | Piscataquis | 747 | 45.2 | 117 | 1822 |
| Princeton | Town | Washington | 745 | 36.9 | 96 | 1832 |
| Monticello | Town | Aroostook | 737 | 38.2 | 99 | 1846 |
| St. Agatha | Town | Aroostook | 730 | 29.5 | 76 | 1899 |
| New Vineyard | Town | Franklin | 721 | 35.7 | 92 | 1802 |
| Westport Island | Town | Lincoln | 719 | 8.8 | 23 | 1828 |
| Freedom | Town | Waldo | 711 | 21.5 | 56 | 1813 |
| Alna | Town | Lincoln | 710 | 20.9 | 54 | 1794 |
| Mercer | Town | Somerset | 709 | 26.7 | 69 | 1804 |
| Prospect | Town | Waldo | 698 | 18.1 | 47 | 1794 |
| Otis | Town | Hancock | 673 | 24.8 | 64 | 1835 |
| Carrabassett Valley | Town | Franklin | 673 | 77.5 | 201 | 1971 |
| Blaine | Town | Aroostook | 667 | 18.6 | 48 | 1862 |
| Sebec | Town | Piscataquis | 665 | 36.8 | 95 | 1812 |
| Oakfield | Town | Aroostook | 661 | 35.2 | 91 | 1831 |
| Abbot | Town | Piscataquis | 650 | 34.5 | 89 | 1827 |
| Eustis | Town | Franklin | 641 | 39.1 | 101 | 1871 |
| LaGrange | Town | Penobscot | 635 | 49.5 | 128 | 1832 |
| Southport | Town | Lincoln | 622 | 5.4 | 14 | 1842 |
| Jackson | Town | Waldo | 610 | 25.3 | 66 | 1812 |
| Monson | Town | Piscataquis | 609 | 46.8 | 121 | 1822 |
| Somerville | Town | Lincoln | 600 | 21.9 | 57 | 1858 |
| Mattawamkeag | Town | Penobscot | 596 | 37.7 | 98 | 1860 |
| Starks | Town | Somerset | 593 | 31.6 | 82 | 1795 |
| Danforth | Town | Washington | 587 | 54.0 | 140 | 1860 |
| Islesboro | Town | Waldo | 583 | 14.3 | 37 | 1789 |
| Jonesboro | Town | Washington | 579 | 36.6 | 95 | 1809 |
| Vienna | Town | Kennebec | 578 | 24.3 | 63 | 1802 |
| New Sweden | Town | Aroostook | 577 | 34.6 | 90 | 1870 |
| New Limerick | Town | Aroostook | 574 | 18.4 | 48 | 1837 |
| Chester | Town | Penobscot | 549 | 45.8 | 119 | 1834 |
| Robbinston | Town | Washington | 539 | 28.2 | 73 | 1811 |
| Bridgewater | Town | Aroostook | 532 | 38.8 | 100 | 1858 |
| Marshfield | Town | Washington | 528 | 17.0 | 44 | 1846 |
| Temple | Town | Franklin | 527 | 35.5 | 92 | 1803 |
| Alexander | Town | Washington | 525 | 40.1 | 104 | 1825 |
| Cutler | Town | Washington | 524 | 47.0 | 122 | 1826 |
| Wallagrass | Town | Aroostook | 519 | 40.1 | 104 | 1979 |
| Carthage | Town | Franklin | 509 | 33.3 | 86 | 1826 |
| Verona Island | Town | Hancock | 507 | 6.2 | 16 | 1839 |
| Chapman | Town | Aroostook | 491 | 38.4 | 99 | 1874 |
| Ripley | Town | Somerset | 484 | 24.6 | 64 | 1816 |
| Whiting | Town | Washington | 482 | 46.7 | 121 | 1825 |
| Arrowsic | Town | Sagadahoc | 477 | 7.8 | 20 | 1841 |
| Columbia Falls | Town | Washington | 476 | 24.6 | 64 | 1863 |
| Moscow | Town | Somerset | 475 | 45.9 | 119 | 1816 |
| Mariaville | Town | Hancock | 472 | 38.7 | 100 | 1836 |
| Winter Harbor | Town | Hancock | 461 | 14.4 | 37 | 1895 |
| Westfield | Town | Aroostook | 455 | 40.3 | 104 | 1905 |
| Avon | Town | Franklin | 450 | 41.4 | 107 | 1802 |
| Cambridge | Town | Somerset | 443 | 19.3 | 50 | 1834 |
| Beals | Town | Washington | 443 | 5.6 | 15 | 1925 |
| Smyrna | Town | Aroostook | 439 | 35.1 | 91 | 1839 |
| St. Francis | Town | Aroostook | 438 | 30.0 | 78 | 1875 |
| Columbia | Town | Washington | 435 | 36.3 | 94 | 1796 |
| Ludlow | Town | Aroostook | 434 | 22.0 | 57 | 1864 |
| Eastbrook | Town | Hancock | 424 | 33.4 | 87 | 1837 |
| North Haven | Town | Knox | 417 | 11.6 | 30 | 1846 |
| Newry | Town | Oxford | 411 | 61.5 | 159 | 1805 |
| Sweden | Town | Oxford | 406 | 28.8 | 75 | 1813 |
| Winn | Town | Penobscot | 399 | 43.7 | 113 | 1857 |
| Chebeague Island | Town | Cumberland | 396 | 3.6 | 9.3 | 2007 |
| Stow | Town | Oxford | 393 | 24.3 | 63 | 1833 |
| Stacyville | Town | Penobscot | 380 | 39.5 | 102 | 1860 |
| Weld | Town | Franklin | 376 | 59.5 | 154 | 1816 |
| Castle Hill | Town | Aroostook | 373 | 35.7 | 92 | 1903 |
| Burlington | Town | Penobscot | 373 | 54.0 | 140 | 1832 |
| Perham | Town | Aroostook | 371 | 36.5 | 95 | 1867 |
| Lowell | Town | Penobscot | 368 | 38.3 | 99 | 1837 |
| Grand Isle | Town | Aroostook | 366 | 34.6 | 90 | 1869 |
| Roxbury | Town | Oxford | 361 | 42.9 | 111 | 1835 |
| Portage Lake | Town | Aroostook | 359 | 30.8 | 80 | 1909 |
| Passadumkeag | Town | Penobscot | 356 | 22.9 | 59 | 1835 |
| Swan's Island | Town | Hancock | 355 | 12.4 | 32 | 1897 |
| Charlotte | Town | Washington | 337 | 31.0 | 80 | 1825 |
| Waltham | Town | Hancock | 332 | 29.7 | 77 | 1833 |
| New Canada | Town | Aroostook | 310 | 35.8 | 93 | 1881 |
| Dallas Plantation | Plantation | Franklin | 304 | 39.0 | 101 | 1845 |
| Dennysville | Town | Washington | 300 | 14.9 | 39 | 1818 |
| Wade | Town | Aroostook | 299 | 36.1 | 93 | 1913 |
| Roque Bluffs | Town | Washington | 296 | 10.4 | 27 | 1891 |
| Springfield | Town | Penobscot | 293 | 38.5 | 100 | 1834 |
| Caswell | Town | Aroostook | 293 | 41.3 | 107 | 1878 |
| Hanover | Town | Oxford | 286 | 7.0 | 18 | 1843 |
| Sorrento | Town | Hancock | 279 | 4.0 | 10 | 1895 |
| St. John Plantation | Plantation | Aroostook | 263 | 50.3 | 130 | 1874 |
| Stoneham | Town | Oxford | 261 | 33.8 | 88 | 1834 |
| Amity | Town | Aroostook | 253 | 41.7 | 108 | 1836 |
| Shirley | Town | Piscataquis | 251 | 53.3 | 138 | 1834 |
| Stockholm | Town | Aroostook | 250 | 34.2 | 89 | 1911 |
| Crystal | Town | Aroostook | 248 | 40.4 | 105 | 1878 |
| Amherst | Town | Hancock | 248 | 39.3 | 102 | 1831 |
| Weston | Town | Aroostook | 245 | 30.6 | 79 | 1835 |
| Allagash | Town | Aroostook | 237 | 128.6 | 333 | 1885 |
| Long Island | Town | Cumberland | 234 | 1.4 | 3.6 | 1993 |
| Medford | Town | Piscataquis | 230 | 42.3 | 110 | 1824 |
| Wellington | Town | Piscataquis | 229 | 39.9 | 103 | 1828 |
| Dyer Brook | Town | Aroostook | 215 | 38.5 | 100 | 1858 |
| Merrill | Town | Aroostook | 208 | 37.4 | 97 | 1876 |
| Masardis | Town | Aroostook | 204 | 38.7 | 100 | 1839 |
| Whitneyville | Town | Washington | 202 | 14.9 | 39 | 1845 |
| Woodville | Town | Penobscot | 201 | 42.7 | 111 | 1895 |
| Baring Plantation | Plantation | Washington | 201 | 20.9 | 54 | 1825 |
| Gilead | Town | Oxford | 195 | 18.9 | 49 | 1804 |
| Winterville Plantation | Plantation | Aroostook | 194 | 35.6 | 92 | 1884 |
| Moose River | Town | Somerset | 188 | 40.1 | 104 | 1903 |
| Mount Chase | Town | Penobscot | 187 | 36.7 | 95 | 1864 |
| Rangeley Plantation | Plantation | Franklin | 184 | 40.7 | 105 | 1895 |
| Topsfield | Town | Washington | 179 | 50.1 | 130 | 1838 |
| Northfield | Town | Washington | 178 | 43.6 | 113 | 1838 |
| Cooper | Town | Washington | 168 | 30.7 | 80 | 1822 |
| Hamlin | Town | Aroostook | 166 | 23.4 | 61 | 1859 |
| Cranberry Isles | Town | Hancock | 160 | 3.2 | 8.3 | 1830 |
| Orient | Town | Aroostook | 156 | 35.5 | 92 | 1856 |
| Lake View Plantation | Plantation | Piscataquis | 150 | 41.5 | 107 | 1892 |
| Meddybemps | Town | Washington | 139 | 13.1 | 34 | 1841 |
| Carroll Plantation | Plantation | Penobscot | 138 | 43.9 | 114 | 1845 |
| Bowerbank | Town | Piscataquis | 136 | 41.9 | 109 | 1907 |
| Willimantic | Town | Piscataquis | 134 | 43.2 | 112 | 1881 |
| Edinburg | Town | Penobscot | 134 | 35.0 | 91 | 1835 |
| Beaver Cove | Town | Piscataquis | 133 | 31.9 | 83 | 1975 |
| Coplin Plantation | Plantation | Franklin | 131 | 33.1 | 86 | 1866 |
| Reed Plantation | Plantation | Aroostook | 129 | 59.0 | 153 | 1843 |
| Sandy River Plantation | Plantation | Franklin | 128 | 34.1 | 88 | 1905 |
| Grand Lake Stream | Plantation | Washington | 125 | 44.2 | 114 | 1897 |
| Wesley | Town | Washington | 122 | 49.9 | 129 | 1833 |
| Lakeville | Town | Penobscot | 104 | 58.3 | 151 | 1868 |
| Byron | Town | Oxford | 103 | 51.8 | 134 | 1833 |
| Vanceboro | Town | Washington | 102 | 20.1 | 52 | 1871 |
| Haynesville | Town | Aroostook | 97 | 41.4 | 107 | 1876 |
| Crawford | Town | Washington | 93 | 34.5 | 89 | 1828 |
| Aurora | Town | Hancock | 93 | 37.7 | 98 | 1831 |
| Isle au Haut | Town | Knox | 92 | 12.5 | 32 | 1874 |
| Hammond | Town | Aroostook | 91 | 39.1 | 101 | 1885 |
| Maxfield | Town | Penobscot | 89 | 18.9 | 49 | 1840 |
| Pleasant Ridge Plantation | Plantation | Somerset | 85 | 22.0 | 57 | 1840 |
| Caratunk | Town | Somerset | 81 | 52.3 | 135 | 1840 |
| Westmanland | Town | Aroostook | 79 | 35.6 | 92 | 1870 |
| Garfield Plantation | Plantation | Aroostook | 79 | 38.3 | 99 | 1885 |
| Cyr Plantation | Plantation | Aroostook | 78 | 38.3 | 99 | 1870 |
| Deblois | Town | Washington | 74 | 35.9 | 93 | 1852 |
| Hersey | Town | Aroostook | 73 | 39.7 | 103 | 1873 |
| Talmadge | Town | Washington | 70 | 37.8 | 98 | 1875 |
| Upton | Town | Oxford | 69 | 39.5 | 102 | 1860 |
| Webster Plantation | Plantation | Penobscot | 68 | 36.6 | 95 | 1856 |
| Waite | Town | Washington | 66 | 44.0 | 114 | 1876 |
| Osborn | Town | Hancock | 65 | 35.2 | 91 | 1976 |
| Monhegan | Plantation | Lincoln | 64 | 0.9 | 2.3 | 1839 |
| Macwahoc Plantation | Plantation | Aroostook | 62 | 29.4 | 76 | 1844 |
| Brighton Plantation | Plantation | Somerset | 62 | 39.3 | 102 | 1816 |
| Great Pond | Town | Hancock | 61 | 37.8 | 98 | 1840 |
| Dennistown Plantation | Plantation | Somerset | 61 | 38.8 | 100 | 1873 |
| Beddington | Town | Washington | 60 | 34.6 | 90 | 1833 |
| West Forks | Plantation | Somerset | 58 | 48.9 | 127 | 1893 |
| Matinicus Isle | Plantation | Knox | 53 | 2.3 | 6.0 | 1840 |
| Highland Plantation | Plantation | Somerset | 52 | 42.0 | 109 | 1886 |
| The Forks | Plantation | Somerset | 48 | 39.6 | 103 | 1840 |
| Moro Plantation | Plantation | Aroostook | 44 | 35.4 | 92 | 1891 |
| Lincoln Plantation | Plantation | Oxford | 41 | 32.5 | 84 | 1875 |
| Seboeis Plantation | Plantation | Penobscot | 40 | 40.0 | 104 | 1890 |
| Frye Island | Town | Cumberland | 32 | 1.3 | 3.4 | 1998 |
| Frenchboro | Town | Hancock | 29 | 4.8 | 12 | 1979 |
| Kingsbury Plantation | Plantation | Piscataquis | 28 | 44.1 | 114 | 1836 |
| Nashville Plantation | Plantation | Aroostook | 27 | 35.2 | 91 | 1895 |
| Glenwood Plantation | Plantation | Aroostook | 5 | 38.1 | 99 | 1863 |

== Former municipalities ==
| Former municipality | Now part of | County | Year disincorporated |
|---|---|---|---|
| Drew Plantation | Drew UT | Penobscot | 2023 |
| Magalloway Plantation | North Oxford UT | Oxford | 2021 |
| Atkinson | Southeast Piscataquis UT | Piscataquis | 2019 |
| Cary Plantation | South Aroostook UT | Aroostook | 2019 |
| Codyville Plantation | North Washington UT | Washington | 2019 |
| Oxbow | Northwest Aroostook UT | Aroostook | 2017 |
| Bancroft | Bancroft UT | Aroostook | 2015 |
| Centerville | North Washington UT | Washington | 2004 |
| Madrid | East Central Franklin UT | Franklin | 2000 |
| Greenfield | East Central Penobscot UT | Penobscot | 1993 |
| E Plantation | Central Aroostook UT | Aroostook | 1990 |
| Prentiss | Prentiss UT | Penobscot | 1990 |
| Benedicta | South Aroostook UT | Aroostook | 1987 |
| Cathance | East Central Washington UT | Washington | 1986 |
| Blanchard | Blanchard UT | Piscataquis | 1984 |
| Elliottsville | Northeast Piscataquis UT | Piscataquis | 1983 |
| Big Lake | North Washington UT | Washington | 1983 |
| Barnard | Northeast Piscataquis UT | Piscataquis | 1982 |
| Grand Falls | East Central Penobscot UT | Penobscot | 1981 |
| Dead River | Northwest Somerset UT | Somerset | 1951 |
| Flagstaff | Northwest Somerset UT | Somerset | 1951 |
| Connor | Connor UT | Aroostook | 1945 |
| Orneville | Southeast Piscataquis UT | Piscataquis | 1945 |
| Trescott | East Central Washington UT | Washington | 1945 |
| Kingman | Kingman UT | Penobscot | 1945 |
| Salem | East Central Franklin UT | Franklin | 1945 |
| Milton Plantation | Milton UT | Oxford | 1944 |
| Unity Plantation | Unity UT | Kennebec | 1942 |
| Brookton | North Washington UT | Washington | 1942 |
| Silver Ridge | South Aroostook UT | Aroostook | 1941 |
| Williamsburg | Northeast Piscataquis UT | Piscataquis | 1940 |
| Bigelow | Northwest Somerset UT | Somerset | 1940 |
| Lexington | Central Somerset UT | Somerset | 1940 |
| Concord | Central Somerset UT | Somerset | 1939 |
| Marion | East Central Washington UT | Washington | 1939 |
| Argyle | Argyle UT | Penobscot | 1938 |
| Freeman | East Central Franklin UT | Franklin | 1938 |
| Edmunds | East Central Washington UT | Washington | 1938 |
| Albany | South Oxford UT | Oxford | 1937 |
| Mayfield | Northeast Somerset UT | Somerset | 1937 |
| Mason | South Oxford UT | Oxford | 1936 |
| Lang | North Franklin UT | Franklin | 1935 |
| Chesuncook | Northwest Piscataquis UT | Piscataquis | 1933 |
| Long Pond | Northeast Somerset UT | Somerset | 1929 |
| Criehaven | Criehaven UT | Knox | 1925 |
| Forest City | North Washington UT | Washington | 1924 |
| Grafton | North Oxford UT | Oxford | 1919 |
| Perkins | Perkins UT | Sagadahoc | 1918 |
| Muscle Ridge | Muscle Ridge Islands UT | Knox | 1916 |
| Fletchers Landing | Central Hancock UT | Hancock | 1913 |
| Mattamiscontis | North Penobscot UT | Penobscot | 1907 |
| Lambert Lake | North Washington UT | Washington | 1903 |
| Deering | Portland | Cumberland | 1899 |
| Kossuth | North Washington UT | Washington | 1895 |
| Berlin | West Central Franklin UT, Phillips | Franklin | 1878 |
| Danville | Auburn | Androscoggin | 1867 |
| Harlem | China | Kennebec | 1822 |

== See also ==
- List of places in Maine
  - List of census-designated places in Maine
  - List of counties in Maine
  - List of unorganized territories in Maine
- Minor civil division
- Township
- List of cities in the United States
- New England town
- List of New England towns
