= Maine School Administrative District 4 =

Maine School Administrative District 4 (MSAD 4) is an operating school district in the U.S. state of Maine, covering the towns of Abbot, Cambridge, Guilford, Parkman, Sangerville, and Wellington. Its schools are Piscataquis Community Secondary School and Piscataquis Community Elementary School.
