= Schoodic Lake =

Lake in Maine, United States

- Location within Maine
- Location: Piscataquis County, Maine
- Coordinates: 45°22′N 68°55′W
- Primary outflows: Schoodic Stream
- Basin countries: United States
- Max. length: 8.3 mi (13.4 km)
- Max. width: 2.7 mi (4.3 km)
- Surface area: 7,021 acres (2,841 ha)
- Max. depth: 188 feet (57 m)
- Water volume: 505,377 acre⋅ft (623,373,000 m^{3})
- Surface elevation: 430 ft (130 m)

Schoodic Lake is a deep Maine lake with a small drainage basin. The lake covers much of the western half of Lake View Plantation. Tributaries drain Orson Bog, Norton Pond, and Jaquith Pond in eastern Brownville. The south end of the lake overflows through Schoodic Stream 5 miles (8.0 km) to the Piscataquis River 13 miles (21 km) upstream of the Piscataquis confluence with the Penobscot River at Howland. The lake provides good habitat for togue, squaretail, and land-locked Atlantic salmon. Fishermen also find smallmouth bass, white sucker and round whitefish.
