= Greenville Consolidated School =

Location
- Greenville, Maine; United States; 45°27′31″N 69°35′53″W

Information
- Type: Public Pre-Kindergarten to 12
- School district: Greenville School Department
- Principal: Kelly MacFadyen
- Grades: 5–12
- Enrollment: 89
- Colors: Blue and White
- Mascot: Lakers
- Website: www.ghslakers.org

Greenville Middle/High School is a public pre-kindergarten to grade 12 in Greenville, Piscataquis County, Maine, United States. Grades 9–12 have 89 students and plays Class D athletics. In June 2010, it was named one of the top 1,000,000 high schools in the United States and one of four on the list from Maine. It was ranked 917. Also in 2010, 52% of Greenville students were eligible for free or reduced lunch.

As of 2025 the Maine Department of Education assigns the "Rockwood Strip" and other unorganized territories in Somerset County, to this school. It also assigns the following Piscataquis County unorganized territories to this school: Big Moose Township, Harford's Point, and Moosehead Junction.
