= James Cameron (artist) =

Scottish-born American portrait and landscape painter

- Born: 19 September 1816; Greenock, Scotland
- Died: 5 January 1882 (aged 65); Oakland, California

James Cameron (19 Sep 1816 - 5 Jan 1882) was a Scottish-born American portrait and landscape painter, born in Greenock, Renfrewshire, Scotland, the son of a surgeon, Dr. William Cameron and wife Agnes. Cameron's family immigrated to the United States in about 1833 when Cameron was 16 and settled in Philadelphia, where Cameron met and married Emma Alcock. Cameron traveled with his new wife to Italy where he pursued his studies in landscape painting. Upon returning to the United States, Cameron moved to Nashville, Tennessee, where he met Col. James A. Whiteside from Chattanooga, who was deeply interested in the development of the city and persuaded Cameron and his wife to relocate to Chattanooga.

Cameron enjoyed the artistic possibilities of the Tennessee Valley and decided to make Chattanooga his permanent home. He purchased the area around Cameron Hill and built a one-story stucco home there. His most significant paintings feature portions of the Tennessee Valley around Chattanooga and Knoxville, TN.

Belle Isle from Lyon's View is a location near Knoxville, TN, to which James Cameron returned several times. At least four versions of this painting are known; two versions of the painting can be found at the Knoxville Museum of Art and the Tennessee State Museum.

During the Civil War, James Cameron sided with the Union, so he and his wife abandoned their home in Chattanooga and returned to Philadelphia. After the War, Cameron returned to Chattanooga to find his house devastated and his mother dead, so he and Emma moved to Maine where he gave up his art to become a Congregationalist minister, first in Greenville, Maine (1868-1872), where he had a mission to the lumbermen, then in Waterville (1872-1874). Cameron moved to California in 1874, because the climate of Maine "did not agree with him," where he founded a Presbyterian church, but he occasionally continued to exhibit his oil paintings. He died from accidental poisoning by his wife, who confused carbolic acid with a digestive tonic that Cameron had been prescribed. Directly before his death, Cameron and his wife had booked tickets on a steamship to move to Hawaii, where he planned to continue his ministerial work, and his wife and belongings were already shipped there at the time of his death.

The book Paintbrush for Hire by Frederick C. Moffatt provides a detailed synopsis of the travels and life of James and Emma Cameron.

View of Moccasin Bend, Chattanooga
