= Israel Dammon trial =

The Israel Dammon trial was a court case (State of Maine vs. Israel Dammon) that occurred 17-18 Feb 1845 in Dover, Maine. Israel Dammon (1811–1886), sometimes misspelled, e.g., Damman or Damon, was arrested during a loud, fanatical worship event at the farmhouse of James Ayer, Jr., in nearby Atkinson on 15 Feb.

== Event ==
That snowy, Saturday evening of 15 Feb 1845, most of the 50-60 attendees at Ayer's farmhouse were Millerite Adventists who, less than four months earlier, had experienced disappointment that Jesus had not returned to earth, as they had anticipated. Elder Dammon, a former sea captain from Exeter, presided at the event, that featured two young, female visionaries, Dorinda Baker of Orrington and 17-year old Ellen Harmon from Portland, along with other vising elders, including, Simeon Hall, James White, and Elder Wood.

After someone apparently complained to the authorities, deputy sheriff Joseph Moulton and three colleagues arrived to investigate. However, not being granted access, they broke open the door and attempted to arrest Dammon. But many of the women present jumped on him and prevented his arrest. Moulton called for backup but to no avail. Finally, after even more help arrived, they were able to take Dammon into custody.

== Trial ==
According to historian Frederick Hoyt, who first discovered and published the trial report from 7 Mar 1845 in the Piscataguis Farmer of Dover in Piscataquis County, "Dammon had been charged with being 'a vagabond and idle person, going about in the town of Atkinson ... from place to place, begging,' being 'a common railer or brawler, neglecting his calling or employment, misspending his earnings,' and failing to 'provide for the support of himself [or his] family, and against the peace of the State of Maine, and contrary to form of Statute in such cases made and provided.'"

Despite some contradictory testimony, the 38 sworn or affirmed witnesses for both sides agreed on most details concerning the event in question. It was loud and boisterous. There were trances and visions, shouting, crawling and rolling on the floor, washing and kissing feet, declarations that some were going to hell and that people should not work, and spiritual (holy) kissing between men and women. Ellen Harmon lay on the floor in vision and sat up to confront people with what she claimed to have seen regarding them. Some said she was known as "Imitation of Christ;" others disagreed. Dorinda Baker went into a bedroom with various men, although there was no consensus as to their identity. Some were baptized in the nearby, frigid stream. One witness stated, "I never saw such confusion, not even in a drunken frolic."

The court pronounced Dammon "guilty" and sentenced him to 10 days in prison, but his attorney appealed and managed to get the case dropped. He never served time.

== Aftermath ==
The trial of Israel Dammon would be an insignificant footnote in 19th century Maine history were it not for the fact that two participating people who were not arrested nor testified at trial eventually became two of the principal founders of the Seventh-day Adventist Church—the traveling team of James White and his eventual wife, Ellen Harmon. Aside from James' mute presence and uncertain involvement with Dorinda Baker, Ellen was the featured personality of the event, lying on the floor for hours receiving visions and periodically sitting up to deliver her messages that often called for various people immediately to be baptized so as not "to go to hell."

In 1860, she reflected on this trip with James in 1845, ostensibly to confront Millerite fanaticism throughout Maine. In this context, she discussed the events at Atkinson but gave a very different account compared what the trial report conveyed. The confusion and chaos of the event and her central ecstatic role in the reception of visions while lying on the floor and sharing the hell-fire messages with those present, all far from her supposed mission of confronting fanaticism, were conveniently ignored. Instead, she focused on how the power of God for about forty minutes prevented officials from arresting "Eld. D," who later kept his guard up all night with his "singing, and praying, and praising the Lord." Although she mentioned the trial, her account differed significantly from the newspaper report. Clearly, James' and her participation in the Atkinson event had become a major embarrassment to them and their colleagues in the nascent denomination.

This matter emerged periodically throughout the rest of Ellen's life. In 1874, Miles Grant, a spiritual descendant of William Miller, became a vocal critic of Ellen White. In a debate with Dudley Canright, still a Seventh-day Adventist at the time, Grant claimed that he had correspondence from Israel Dammon asserting that he had rejected the validity of White's visions. Canright countered by stating that her visions had exposed his fanaticism. A recent scholar has pointed to the uncharacteristic absence of Ellen's participation in a supposedly Dammon-related fanatical meeting in 1845 in Canright's later attack on Seventh-day Adventism as evidence that her 1860 account of the meeting is more credible than the contemporary newspaper report. Canright repeatedly used every argument he could against Ellen White, so although this is an argument from silence, it does provide nuance to the discussions and evidence that early Adventists were familiar with the Dammon incident but did not consider it credible enough to refute any further in their continued apologetic literature.

== See also ==
- Charismatic Adventism
- History of the Seventh-day Adventist Church
