= Kingsbury Plantation, Maine =

- Plantation
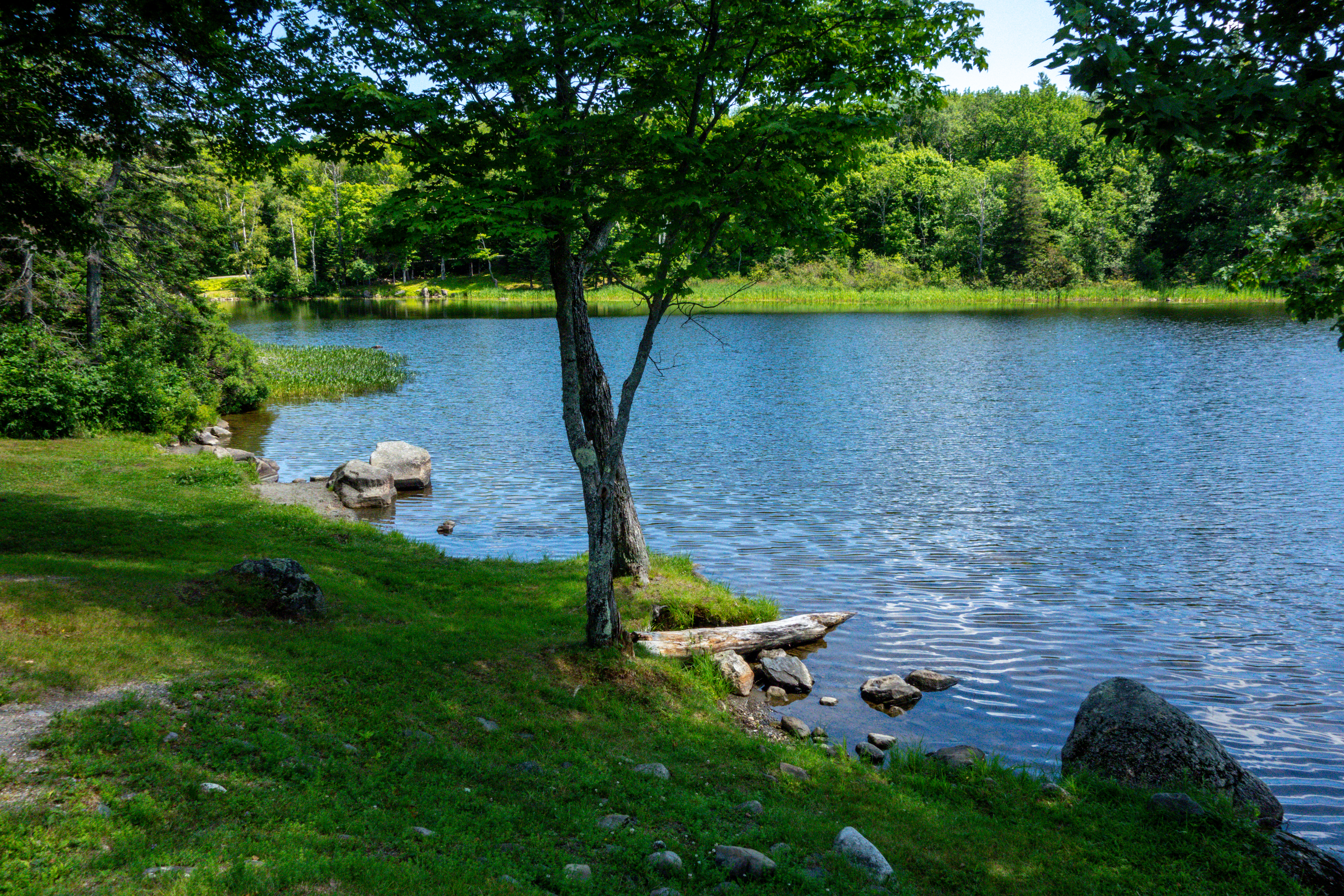
- Kingsbury Pond

- Location in Piscataquis County and the state of Maine
- Coordinates: 45°9′0″N 69°35′51″W
- Country: United States
- State: Maine
- County: Piscataquis

Area
  - Total: 44.6 sq mi (115.6 km^{2})
  - Land: 44.1 sq mi (114.3 km^{2})
  - Water: 0.46 sq mi (1.2 km^{2})
- Elevation: 890 ft (270 m)

Population (2020)
  - Total: 28
  - Density: 0.63/sq mi (0.24/km^{2})
- Time zone: UTC-5 (Eastern (EST))
  - Summer (DST): UTC-4 (EDT)
- ZIP Codes: 04406 (Abbot); 04942 (Harmony)
- Area code: 207
- FIPS code: 23-37095
- GNIS feature ID: 0582543

Kingsbury Plantation is a plantation in Piscataquis County, Maine, United States. The plantation was named for Judge Sanford Kingsbury, a landowner. As of the 2020 census, the plantation had a total population of 28.

== History ==
The area that now contains the plantation was originally part of the Bingham Purchase and was purchased by Judge Sanford Kingsbury in 1833 for $4,000. Kingsbury built two mills on Kingsbury Pond in 1835, and the area grew quickly enough that on March 22, 1836 it was incorporated as the town of Kingsbury. By the 1880s, the town had a store, hotel, church, and two schoolhouses. In 1886, the town disbanded, and it reorganized as a plantation in 1887. The reorganization as a plantation was validated by the state legislature in 1895.

== Geography ==
According to the United States Census Bureau, the plantation has a total area of 44.6 square miles (116 km^{2}), of which 44.1 square miles (114 km^{2}) is land and 0.5 square miles (1.3 km^{2}) (1.08%) is water. The plantation includes Foss Pond in the north, part of Whetstone Pond in the northeast, and part of Kingsbury Pond in the southwest. The 1,532-ft high Foss Mountain is located in the plantation.

== Demographics ==
Historical population
Census	Pop.	Note	%±
1840	227		—
1850	181		−20.3%
1860	191		5.5%
1870	174		−8.9%
1880	198		13.8%
1890	205		3.5%
1900	106		−48.3%
1910	108		1.9%
1920	63		−41.7%
1930	50		−20.6%
1940	63		26.0%
1950	35		−44.4%
1960	8		−77.1%
1970	7		−12.5%
1980	4		−42.9%
1990	13		225.0%
2000	9		−30.8%
2010	28		211.1%
2020	28		0.0%
U.S. Decennial Census

As of the census of 2000, there were 9 people, 6 households, and 1 family residing in the plantation. The population density was 0.2 inhabitants per square mile (0.077/km^{2}). There were 139 housing units at an average density of 3.1 per square mile (1.2/km^{2}). The racial makeup of the plantation was 8 White and 1 from two or more races.

There were 6 households, out of which 2 were married couples living together and 4 were non-families. 3 households were made up of individuals, and 3 had someone living alone who was 65 years of age or older. The average household size was 1.50 and the average family size was 2.00.

In the plantation the population was spread out, with 1 between 25 and 44, 3 from 45 to 64, and 5 ages 65 years of age or older. The median age was 70 years.
