= Bowerbank, Maine =

Town in Maine, United States

- Town
- Nickname: The True Heart of Maine
- Location in Piscataquis County and the state of Maine
- Coordinates: 45°18′43″N 69°15′13″W
- Country: United States
- State: Maine
- County: Piscataquis

Area
  - Total: 47.37 sq mi (122.69 km^{2})
  - Land: 41.90 sq mi (108.52 km^{2})
  - Water: 5.47 sq mi (14.17 km^{2})
- Elevation: 725 ft (221 m)

Population (2020)
  - Total: 136
  - Density: 3.4/sq mi (1.3/km^{2})
- Time zone: UTC-5 (Eastern (EST))
  - Summer (DST): UTC-4 (EDT)
- ZIP Codes: 04426 (Dover-Foxcroft); 04414 (Brownville)
- Area code: 207
- FIPS code: 23-06400
- GNIS feature ID: 0582362
- Website: townofbowerbank.com

Bowerbank is a town in Piscataquis County, Maine, United States. The population was 136 at the 2020 census.

== Geography ==
According to the United States Census Bureau, the town has a total area of 47.37 square miles (122.69 km^{2}), of which 41.90 square miles (108.52 km^{2}) is land and 5.47 square miles (14.17 km^{2}) is water.

== Demographics ==
Historical population
Census	Pop.	Note	%±
1830	49		—
1840	165		236.7%
1850	173		4.8%
1860	101		−41.6%
1870	83		−17.8%
1880	86		3.6%
1890	87		1.2%
1900	66		−24.1%
1910	76		15.2%
1920	41		−46.1%
1930	43		4.9%
1940	49		14.0%
1950	20		−59.2%
1960	17		−15.0%
1970	29		70.6%
1980	27		−6.9%
1990	72		166.7%
2000	123		70.8%
2010	116		−5.7%
2020	136		17.2%
U.S. Decennial Census

=== 2010 census ===
As of the census of 2010, there were 116 people, 63 households, and 37 families living in the town. The population density was 2.8 inhabitants per square mile (1.1/km^{2}). There were 380 housing units at an average density of 9.1 per square mile (3.5/km^{2}). The racial makeup of the town was 99.1% White and 0.9% Native American.

There were 63 households, of which 6.3% had children under the age of 18 living with them, 52.4% were married couples living together, 6.3% had a female householder with no husband present, and 41.3% were non-families. 31.7% of all households were made up of individuals, and 17.4% had someone living alone who was 65 years of age or older. The average household size was 1.84 and the average family size was 2.19.

The median age in the town was 61.5 years. 6.9% of residents were under the age of 18; 0.0% were between the ages of 18 and 24; 10.3% were from 25 to 44; 46.6% were from 45 to 64; and 36.2% were 65 years of age or older. The gender makeup of the town was 46.6% male and 53.4% female.

=== 2000 census ===
As of the census of 2000, there were 123 people, 54 households, and 42 families living in the town. The population density was 2.9 inhabitants per square mile (1.1/km^{2}). There were 327 housing units at an average density of 7.8 per square mile (3.0/km^{2}). The racial makeup of the town was 98.37% White, and 1.63% from two or more races.

There were 54 households, out of which 20.4% had children under the age of 18 living with them, 68.5% were married couples living together, 5.6% had a female householder with no husband present, and 20.4% were non-families. 18.5% of all households were made up of individuals, and 13.0% had someone living alone who was 65 years of age or older. The average household size was 2.28 and the average family size was 2.49.

In the town, the population was spread out, with 17.1% under the age of 18, 5.7% from 18 to 24, 25.2% from 25 to 44, 28.5% from 45 to 64, and 23.6% who were 65 years of age or older. The median age was 48 years. For every 100 females, there were 108.5 males. For every 100 females age 18 and over, there were 108.2 males.

The median income for a household in the town was $27,917, and the median income for a family was $31,875. Males had a median income of $36,250 versus $19,583 for females. The per capita income for the town was $20,946. There were 14.6% of families and 15.0% of the population living below the poverty line, including no under eighteens and 25.7% of those over 64.
