= Beaver Cove, Maine =

Town in Maine, United States

- Town
- Location in Piscataquis County and the state of Maine
- Coordinates: 45°32′05″N 69°32′45″W
- Country: United States
- State: Maine
- County: Piscataquis
- Incorporated (plantation): March 17, 1975
- Incorporated (town): January 31, 1978

Area
  - Total: 32.71 sq mi (84.72 km^{2})
  - Land: 31.85 sq mi (82.49 km^{2})
  - Water: 0.86 sq mi (2.23 km^{2})
- Elevation: 2,030 ft (620 m)

Population (2020)
  - Total: 133
  - Density: 4.1/sq mi (1.6/km^{2})
- Time zone: UTC-5 (Eastern (EST))
  - Summer (DST): UTC-4 (EDT)
- ZIP code: 04441
- Area code: 207
- FIPS code: 23-03740
- GNIS feature ID: 0582345
- Website: beavercoveme.com

Beaver Cove is a town in Piscataquis County, Maine, United States. The population was 133 at the 2020 census.

== Geography ==
According to the United States Census Bureau, the town has a total area of 32.71 square miles (84.72 km^{2}), of which 31.85 square miles (82.49 km^{2}) is land and 0.86 square miles (2.23 km^{2}) is water.

== Demographics ==
Historical population
Census	Pop.	Note	%±
1980	56		—
1990	104		85.7%
2000	91		−12.5%
2010	122		34.1%
2020	133		9.0%
U.S. Decennial Census

=== 2010 census ===
As of the census of 2010, there were 122 people, 61 households, and 43 families living in the town. The population density was 3.8 inhabitants per square mile (1.5/km^{2}). There were 269 housing units at an average density of 8.4 per square mile (3.2/km^{2}). The racial makeup of the town was 99.2% White and 0.8% from two or more races. Hispanic or Latino people of any race were 2.5% of the population.

There were 61 households, of which 16.4% had children under the age of 18 living with them, 65.6% were married couples living together, 3.3% had a female householder with no husband present, 1.6% had a male householder with no wife present, and 29.5% were non-families. 27.9% of all households were made up of individuals, and 11.5% had someone living alone who was 65 years of age or older. The average household size was 2.00 and the average family size was 2.33.

The median age in the town was 58.8 years. 12.3% of residents were under the age of 18; 1.7% were between the ages of 18 and 24; 14% were from 25 to 44; 45.1% were from 45 to 64; and 27% were 65 years of age or older. The gender makeup of the town was 50.8% male and 49.2% female.

=== 2000 census ===
At the 2000 census, there were 91 people, 46 households and 28 families living in the town. The population density was 2.9 per square mile (1.1/km^{2}). There were 224 housing units at an average density of 7.1 per square mile (2.7/km^{2}). The racial makeup of the town was 100.00% White.

There were 46 households, of which 13.0% had children under the age of 18 living with them, 58.7% were married couples living together, 2.2% had a female householder with no husband present, and 39.1% were non-families. 37.0% of all households were made up of individuals, and 13.0% had someone living alone who was 65 years of age or older. The average household size was 1.98 and the average family size was 2.57.

3.2% of the population were under the age of 18, 3.3% from 18 to 24, 19.8% from 25 to 44, 41.8% from 45 to 64, and 22.0% who were 65 years of age or older. The median age was 54 years. For every 100 females, there were 102.2 males. For every 100 females age 18 and over, there were 102.6 males.

The median household income was $23,500 and the median family income was $25,417. Males had a median income of $16,250 compared with $11,250 for females. The per capita income for the town was $11,751. There were 35.5% of families and 33.0% of the population living below the poverty line, including no under eighteens and 46.2% of those over 64.
