= Southeast Piscataquis, Maine =

- Unorganized territory
- Location in Piscataquis County and the state of Maine.
- Coordinates: 45°10′35″N 68°55′39″W
- Country: United States
- State: Maine
- County: Piscataquis

Area
  - Total: 38.1 sq mi (98.7 km^{2})
  - Land: 36.3 sq mi (93.9 km^{2})
  - Water: 1.9 sq mi (4.8 km^{2})
- Elevation: 302 ft (92 m)

Population (2020)
  - Total: 487
  - Density: 13.4/sq mi (5.19/km^{2})
- Time zone: UTC-5 (Eastern (EST))
  - Summer (DST): UTC-4 (EDT)
- ZIP Codes: 04426 (Dover-Foxcroft); 04463 (Milo)
- Area code: 207
- FIPS code: 23-70655
- GNIS feature ID: 582734

Southeast Piscataquis is an unincorporated area in Piscataquis County, Maine, United States. It comprises Orneville Township, and, since 2019, Atkinson Township. The population was 487 at the 2020 census.

== Geography ==
According to the United States Census Bureau, the unorganized territory has a total area of 77.1 square miles (199.8 km^{2}), of which 75.1 square miles (194.5 km^{2}) is land and 2.1 square miles (5.4 km^{2}) (2.7%) is water.

== Demographics ==
The population of the unorganized territory nearly doubled between 2010 and 2020, largely due to the disincorporation of Atkinson, which had a population of 326 at the 2010 census.

Historical population
Census	Pop.	Note	%±
1970	156		—
1980	183		17.3%
1990	247		35.0%
2000	254		2.8%
2010	253		−0.4%
2020	487		92.5%
U.S. Decennial Census

As of the census of 2000, there were 254 people, 101 households, and 73 families residing in the unorganized territory. The population density was 7.0 inhabitants per square mile (2.7/km^{2}). There were 317 housing units at an average density of 8.7 per square mile (3.4/km^{2}). The racial makeup of the unorganized territory was 98.82% White, 0.79% Native American and 0.39% Pacific Islander. Hispanic or Latino of any race were 0.39% of the population.

There were 101 households, out of which 31.7% had children under the age of 18 living with them, 58.4% were married couples living together, 1.0% had a female householder with no husband present, and 27.7% were non-families. 19.8% of all households were made up of individuals, and 9.9% had someone living alone who was 65 years of age or older. The average household size was 2.51 and the average family size was 2.78.

In the unorganized territory the population was spread out, with 22.8% under the age of 18, 7.1% from 18 to 24, 26.0% from 25 to 44, 33.1% from 45 to 64, and 11.0% who were 65 years of age or older. The median age was 41 years. For every 100 females, there were 106.5 males. For every 100 females age 18 and over, there were 113.0 males.

The median income for a household in the unorganized territory was $28,036, and the median income for a family was $33,958. Males had a median income of $26,250 versus $23,750 for females. The per capita income for the unorganized territory was $11,940. About 15.9% of families and 27.4% of the population were below the poverty line, including 41.1% of those under the age of 18 and 13.3% of those 65 or over.
