= Medford, Maine =

Town in Maine, United States

- Town
- Seal

- Location in Piscataquis County and the state of Maine.
- Coordinates: 45°16′38″N 68°50′57″W
- Country: United States
- State: Maine
- County: Piscataquis

Area
  - Total: 43.16 sq mi (111.78 km^{2})
  - Land: 42.31 sq mi (109.58 km^{2})
  - Water: 0.85 sq mi (2.20 km^{2})
- Elevation: 330 ft (100 m)

Population (2020)
  - Total: 230
  - Density: 5.4/sq mi (2.1/km^{2})
- Time zone: UTC-5 (Eastern (EST))
  - Summer (DST): UTC-4 (EDT)
- ZIP code: 04463
- Area code: 207
- FIPS code: 23-44830
- GNIS feature ID: 0582589
- Website: townofmedfordmaine.com

Medford is a town in Piscataquis County, Maine, United States. The population was 230 at the 2020 census.

== History ==
In 1808 James Grover was the first white settler in what is now Medford. In 1820, the state opened a road from the Piscataquis River, which helped increase settlement.

In 1820, John Parker Boyd, owner of the eastern half of the town, erected a combination sawmill and shingle mill on the Piscataquis River. In 1824, the town incorporated as Kilmarnock, the name chosen by Boyd.

An 1825 fire destroyed over three-quarters of the buildings in town, as well as the large stand of pine trees used to supply the sawmill and shingle mill. The mill was saved, but later closed because the burning of the nearby trees had deprived the business of a steady supply of wood.

The inhabitants of Kilmarnock petitioned to change the town's name to Medford in 1856. The town surrendered its charter in 1940, and was organized as a plantation in 1942. In 1967, Medford was again organized as a town.

== Geography ==
According to the United States Census Bureau, the town has a total area of 43.16 square miles (111.78 km^{2}), of which 42.31 square miles (109.58 km^{2}) is land and 0.85 square miles (2.20 km^{2}) is water.

== Demographics ==
Historical population
Census	Pop.	Note	%±
1860	353		—
1870	294		−16.7%
1880	398		35.4%
1890	306		−23.1%
1900	282		−7.8%
1910	262		−7.1%
1920	228		−13.0%
1930	251		10.1%
1940	213		−15.1%
1950	191		−10.3%
1970	146		—
1980	163		11.6%
1990	194		19.0%
2000	231		19.1%
2010	254		10.0%
2020	230		−9.4%
U.S. Decennial Census

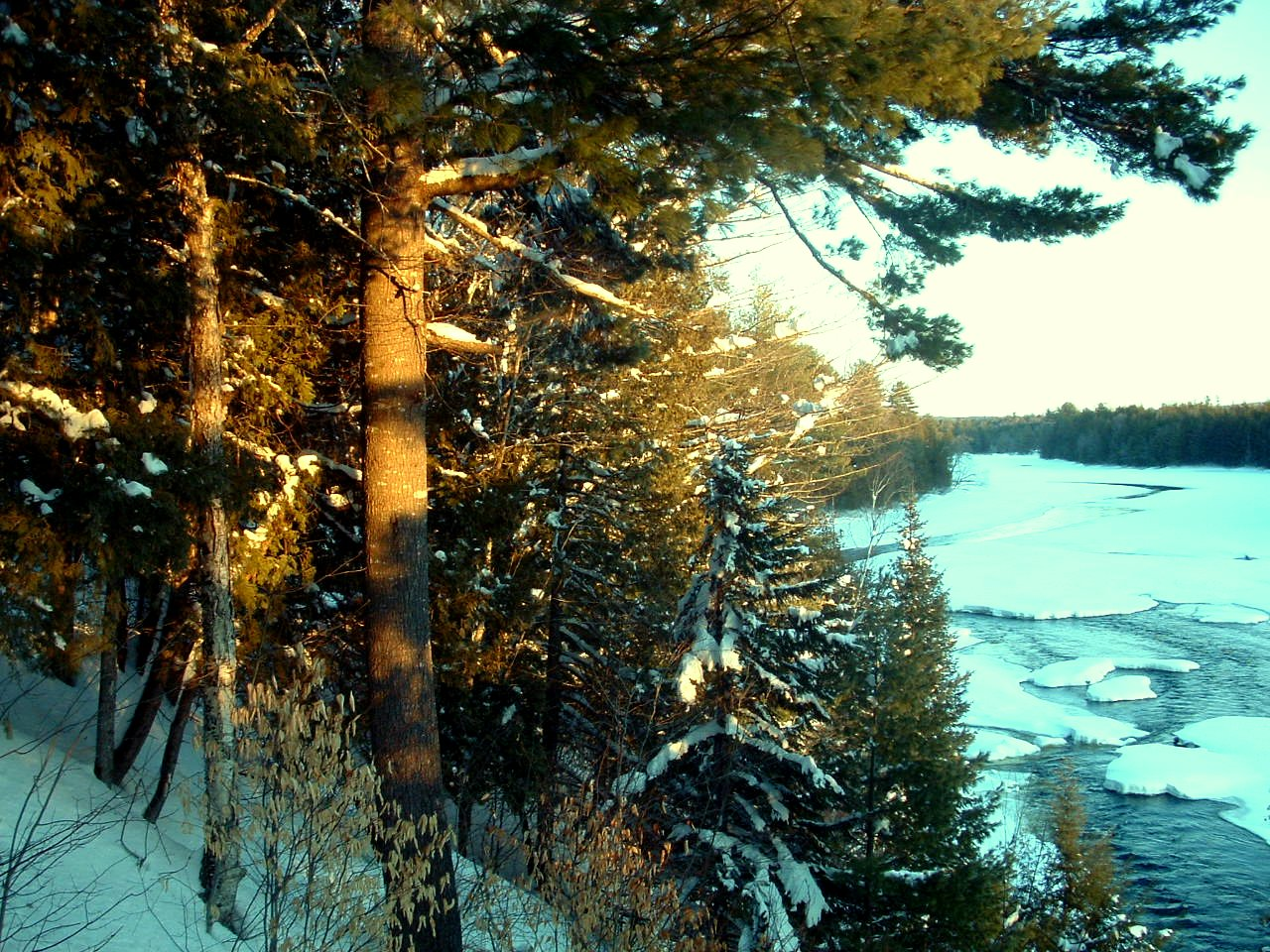
The Piscataquis River in Medford, Maine

=== 2010 census ===
As of the census of 2010, there were 254 people, 104 households, and 74 families residing in the town. The population density was 6.0 inhabitants per square mile (2.3/km^{2}). There were 164 housing units at an average density of 3.9 per square mile (1.5/km^{2}). The racial makeup of the town was 98.8% White, 0.8% African American, and 0.4% from two or more races. Hispanic or Latino of any race were 0.4% of the population.

There were 104 households, of which 24.0% had children under the age of 18 living with them, 60.6% were married couples living together, 5.8% had a female householder with no husband present, 4.8% had a male householder with no wife present, and 28.8% were non-families. 14.4% of all households were made up of individuals, and 2.9% had someone living alone who was 65 years of age or older. The average household size was 2.44 and the average family size was 2.61.

The median age in the town was 46.5 years. 18.1% of residents were under the age of 18; 8.6% were between the ages of 18 and 24; 20% were from 25 to 44; 42.2% were from 45 to 64; and 11% were 65 years of age or older. The gender makeup of the town was 53.5% male and 46.5% female.

=== 2000 census ===
As of the census of 2000, there were 231 people, 88 households, and 69 families residing in the town. The population density was 5.4 people per square mile (2.1/km^{2}). There were 135 housing units at an average density of 3.2 per square mile (1.2/km^{2}). The racial makeup of the town was 99.57% White, and 0.43% from two or more races. Hispanic or Latino of any race were 0.43% of the population.

There were 88 households, out of which 38.6% had children under the age of 18 living with them, 68.2% were married couples living together, 4.5% had a female householder with no husband present, and 20.5% were non-families. 19.3% of all households were made up of individuals, and 4.5% had someone living alone who was 65 years of age or older. The average household size was 2.63 and the average family size was 2.91.

In the town, the population was spread out, with 22.1% under the age of 18, 6.5% from 18 to 24, 37.2% from 25 to 44, 22.1% from 45 to 64, and 12.1% who were 65 years of age or older. The median age was 39 years. For every 100 females, there were 124.3 males. For every 100 females age 18 and over, there were 114.3 males.

The median income for a household in the town was $28,750, and the median income for a family was $30,000. Males had a median income of $21,667 versus $26,250 for females. The per capita income for the town was $12,609. About 10.0% of families and 15.0% of the population were below the poverty line, including 31.7% of those under the age of eighteen and none of those 65 or over.
