= Atkinson, Maine =

- Township
- Location in Piscataquis County and the state of Maine.
- Coordinates: 45°9′25″N 69°3′37″W
- Country: United States
- State: Maine
- County: Piscataquis

Area
  - Total: 39.05 sq mi (101.14 km^{2})
  - Land: 38.79 sq mi (100.47 km^{2})
  - Water: 0.26 sq mi (0.67 km^{2})
- Elevation: 318 ft (97 m)

Population (2010)
  - Total: 326
  - Estimate (2012): 321
  - Density: 8.3/sq mi (3.2/km^{2})
- Time zone: UTC-5 (Eastern (EST))
  - Summer (DST): UTC-4 (EDT)
- ZIP code: 04426
- Area code: 207
- FIPS code: 23-01920
- GNIS feature ID: 0582332

Atkinson is an unincorporated township and former town in Piscataquis County, Maine, United States, and part of the unorganized territory of Southeast Piscataquis, Maine. Its population was 326 at the 2010 census.

== History ==
The township was named after Judge Atkinson, a landholder. It was settled in 1804 and incorporated as a town on February 12, 1819.

Following three votes by the town to deorganize, the state legislature approved the town's efforts with a law taking effect on April 12, 2018. The town's residents confirmed their desire to deorganize by a vote of 187 of 19 on November 6, 2018. The town officially deorganized on July 1, 2019.

== Geography ==
According to the United States Census Bureau, the township has a total area of 39.05 square miles (101.14 km^{2}), of which 38.79 square miles (100.47 km^{2}) is land and 0.26 square miles (0.67 km^{2}) is water.

== Demographics ==
Historical population
Census	Pop.	Note	%±
1820	245		—
1830	418		70.6%
1840	704		68.4%
1850	895		27.1%
1860	897		0.2%
1870	810		−9.7%
1880	828		2.2%
1890	605		−26.9%
1900	495		−18.2%
1910	528		6.7%
1920	456		−13.6%
1930	394		−13.6%
1940	312		−20.8%
1950	400		28.2%
1960	280		−30.0%
1970	213		−23.9%
1980	306		43.7%
1990	332		8.5%
2000	323		−2.7%
2010	326		0.9%
2014 (est.)	318		−2.5%
U.S. Decennial Census

=== 2010 census ===
As of the census of 2010, there were 326 people, 135 households, and 91 families residing in the township. The population density was 8.4 inhabitants per square mile (3.2/km^{2}). There were 198 housing units at an average density of 5.1 per square mile (2.0/km^{2}). The racial makeup of the township was 96.9% White, 1.2% Native American, 0.3% Asian, 0.3% Pacific Islander, and 1.2% from two or more races. Hispanic or Latino of any race were 0.3% of the population.

There were 135 households, of which 24.4% had children under the age of 18 living with them, 61.5% were married couples living together, 2.2% had a female householder with no husband present, 3.7% had a male householder with no wife present, and 32.6% were non-families. 23.7% of all households were made up of individuals, and 11.1% had someone living alone who was 65 years of age or older. The average household size was 2.41 and the average family size was 2.89.

The median age in the township was 47.8 years. 20.2% of residents were under the age of 18; 5% were between the ages of 18 and 24; 21.9% were from 25 to 44; 35% were from 45 to 64; and 18.1% were 65 years of age or older. The gender makeup of the township was 53.7% male and 46.3% female.

=== 2000 census ===
As of the census of 2000, there were 323 people, 132 households, and 97 families residing in the township. The population density was 8.2 inhabitants per square mile (3.2/km^{2}). There were 198 housing units at an average density of 5.1 per square mile (2.0/km^{2}). The racial makeup of the township was 99.69% White, and 0.31% from two or more races. Hispanic or Latino of any race were 0.31% of the population.

There were 132 households, out of which 27.3% had children under the age of 18 living with them, 68.9% were married couples living together, 0.8% had a female householder with no husband present, and 25.8% were non-families. 18.9% of all households were made up of individuals, and 4.5% had someone living alone who was 65 years of age or older. The average household size was 2.45 and the average family size was 2.81.

In the township, the population was spread out, with 23.5% under the age of 18, 4.6% from 18 to 24, 30.3% from 25 to 44, 29.7% from 45 to 64, and 11.8% who were 65 years of age or older. The median age was 41 years. For every 100 females, there were 105.7 males. For every 100 females age 18 and over, there were 107.6 males.

The median income for a household in the township was $29,821, and the median income for a family was $32,083. Males had a median income of $30,469 versus $25,313 for females. The per capita income for the township was $14,755. About 8.9% of families and 17.9% of the population were below the poverty line, including 39.4% of those under age 18 and 5.3% of those age 65 or over.

== Education ==
The Maine Department of Education takes responsibility for coordinating school assignments in the unorganized territory. As of 2025 it lists SeDoMoCha Elementary and Middle School, operated by Regional School Unit 68; Woodland High School; and Foxcroft Academy.

== Notable people ==
- Edward Bunker, Mormon pioneer, founded Bunkerville, Nevada

== See also ==
- Israel Dammon trial
