= Sangerville, Maine =

Town in Maine, United States

- Town
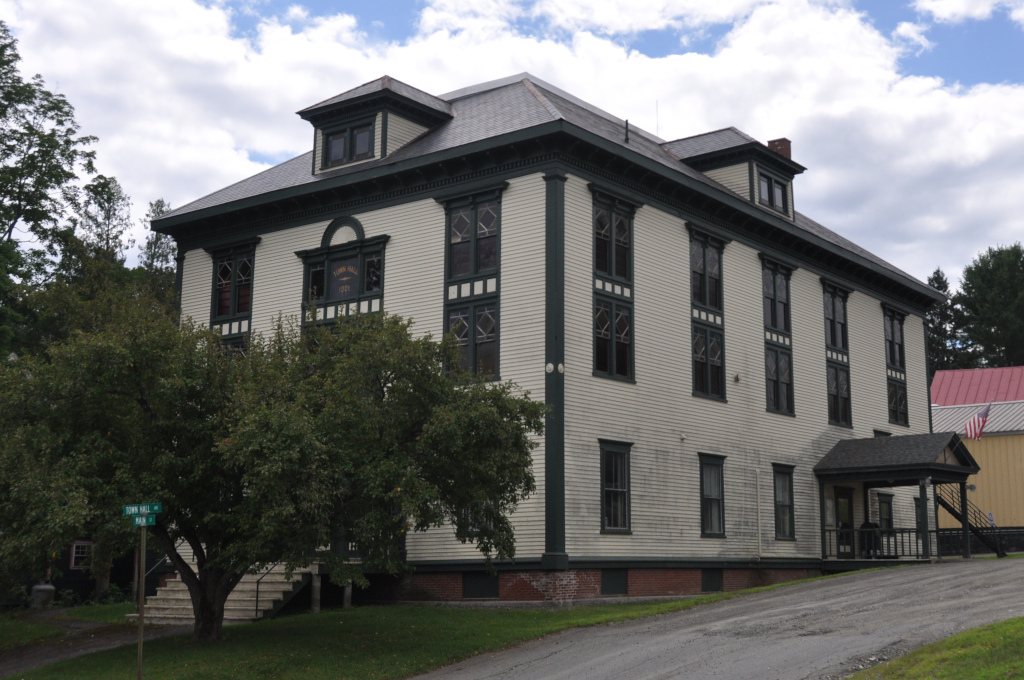
- Town hall

- Location in Piscataquis County and the state of Maine
- Coordinates: 45°7′26″N 69°18′37″W
- Country: United States
- State: Maine
- County: Piscataquis

Area
  - Total: 39.72 sq mi (102.87 km^{2})
  - Land: 38.42 sq mi (99.51 km^{2})
  - Water: 1.30 sq mi (3.37 km^{2})
- Elevation: 505 ft (154 m)

Population (2020)
  - Total: 1,306
  - Density: 34/sq mi (13.1/km^{2})
- Time zone: UTC-5 (Eastern (EST))
  - Summer (DST): UTC-4 (EDT)
- ZIP code: 04479
- Area code: 207
- FIPS code: 23-65865
- GNIS feature ID: 0582713
- Website: sangervilleme.com

Sangerville is a town in Piscataquis County, Maine, United States. The population was 1,306 at the 2020 census. The town was named after Colonel Calvin Sanger, a landowner.

On June 14, 2014, Sangerville celebrated its bicentennial.

== Geography ==
According to the United States Census Bureau, the town has a total area of 39.72 square miles (102.87 km^{2}), of which 38.42 square miles (99.51 km^{2}) is land and 1.30 square miles (3.37 km^{2}) is water.

=== Climate ===
This climatic region is typified by large seasonal temperature differences, with warm to hot (and often humid) summers and cold (sometimes severely cold) winters. According to the Köppen Climate Classification system, Sangerville has a humid continental climate, abbreviated "Dfb" on climate maps.

Climate data for Sangerville, Maine (1991–2020 normals, extremes 2009–present)
Month	Jan	Feb	Mar	Apr	May	Jun	Jul	Aug	Sep	Oct	Nov	Dec	Year
Record high °F (°C)	53 (12)	59 (15)	82 (28)	86 (30)	92 (33)	96 (36)	96 (36)	96 (36)	93 (34)	84 (29)	72 (22)	58 (14)	96 (36)
Mean maximum °F (°C)	48.0 (8.9)	46.4 (8.0)	57.4 (14.1)	72.2 (22.3)	81.8 (27.7)	86.6 (30.3)	90.5 (32.5)	87.3 (30.7)	84.9 (29.4)	73.5 (23.1)	62.8 (17.1)	51.3 (10.7)	91.8 (33.2)
Mean daily maximum °F (°C)	26.6 (−3.0)	29.4 (−1.4)	38.9 (3.8)	51.1 (10.6)	63.8 (17.7)	72.7 (22.6)	78.6 (25.9)	77.8 (25.4)	70.3 (21.3)	56.9 (13.8)	43.6 (6.4)	31.6 (−0.2)	53.4 (11.9)
Daily mean °F (°C)	16.9 (−8.4)	19.1 (−7.2)	28.7 (−1.8)	40.6 (4.8)	53.2 (11.8)	62.1 (16.7)	67.8 (19.9)	66.8 (19.3)	59.1 (15.1)	46.8 (8.2)	34.9 (1.6)	23.5 (−4.7)	43.3 (6.3)
Mean daily minimum °F (°C)	7.2 (−13.8)	8.8 (−12.9)	18.4 (−7.6)	30.1 (−1.1)	42.5 (5.8)	51.4 (10.8)	57.0 (13.9)	55.7 (13.2)	47.8 (8.8)	36.6 (2.6)	26.3 (−3.2)	15.4 (−9.2)	33.1 (0.6)
Mean minimum °F (°C)	−5.5 (−20.8)	−5.0 (−20.6)	0.5 (−17.5)	18.5 (−7.5)	30.7 (−0.7)	40.6 (4.8)	47.7 (8.7)	46.6 (8.1)	35.3 (1.8)	26.5 (−3.1)	12.8 (−10.7)	−0.1 (−17.8)	−9.0 (−22.8)
Record low °F (°C)	−17 (−27)	−21 (−29)	−8 (−22)	8 (−13)	24 (−4)	33 (1)	42 (6)	42 (6)	31 (−1)	20 (−7)	0 (−18)	−16 (−27)	−21 (−29)
Average precipitation inches (mm)	3.06 (78)	2.58 (66)	3.06 (78)	3.61 (92)	3.76 (96)	4.43 (113)	3.45 (88)	3.56 (90)	3.54 (90)	4.81 (122)	3.61 (92)	3.40 (86)	42.87 (1,089)
Average snowfall inches (cm)	16.5 (42)	21.9 (56)	14.3 (36)	5.1 (13)	0.0 (0.0)	0.0 (0.0)	0.0 (0.0)	0.0 (0.0)	0.0 (0.0)	1.7 (4.3)	7.6 (19)	23.7 (60)	90.8 (231)
Average precipitation days (≥ 0.01 in)	8.3	8.3	8.6	11.5	11.9	13.4	12.0	11.6	9.0	12.6	9.8	11.6	128.6
Average snowy days (≥ 0.1 in)	7.9	7.3	5.1	1.7	0.0	0.0	0.0	0.0	0.0	1.0	3.3	8.7	35
Source: NOAA

== Demographics ==
Historical population
Census	Pop.	Note	%±
1820	310		—
1830	776		150.3%
1840	1,197		54.3%
1850	1,267		5.8%
1860	1,314		3.7%
1870	1,140		−13.2%
1880	1,047		−8.2%
1890	1,236		18.1%
1900	1,294		4.7%
1910	1,319		1.9%
1920	1,246		−5.5%
1930	1,225		−1.7%
1940	1,194		−2.5%
1950	1,161		−2.8%
1960	1,157		−0.3%
1970	1,107		−4.3%
1980	1,219		10.1%
1990	1,398		14.7%
2000	1,270		−9.2%
2010	1,343		5.7%
2020	1,306		−2.8%
U.S. Decennial Census

=== 2010 census ===
As of the census of 2010, there were 1,343 people, 612 households, and 402 families living in the town. The population density was 35.0 inhabitants per square mile (13.5/km^{2}). There were 886 housing units at an average density of 23.1 per square mile (8.9/km^{2}). The racial makeup of the town was 96.8% White, 0.4% African American, 1.1% Native American, 0.2% Asian, 0.1% from other races, and 1.3% from two or more races. Hispanic or Latino people of any race were 0.4% of the population.

There were 613 households, of which 23.3% had children under the age of 18 living with them, 52.4% were married couples living together, 7.2% had a female householder with no husband present, 6.0% had a male householder with no wife present, and 34.4% were non-families. 28.9% of all households were made up of individuals, and 14.1% had someone living alone who was 65 years of age or older. The average household size was 2.19 and the average family size was 2.61.

The median age in the town was 48.6 years. 18.2% of residents were under the age of 18; 6% were between the ages of 18 and 24; 19.8% were from 25 to 44; 35.7% were from 45 to 64; and 20.3% were 65 years of age or older. The gender makeup of the town was 48.3% male and 51.7% female.

=== 2000 census ===
As of the census of 2000, there were 1,270 people, 554 households, and 361 families living in the town. The population density was 33.0 inhabitants per square mile (12.7/km^{2}). There were 787 housing units at an average density of 20.4 per square mile (7.9/km^{2}). The racial makeup of the town was 98.35% White, 0.55% African American, 0.47% Native American, 0.16% Asian, and 0.47% from two or more races. Hispanic or Latino people of any race were 0.39% of the population.

There were 554 households, out of which 26.4% had children under the age of 18 living with them, 53.1% were married couples living together, 8.5% had a female householder with no husband present, and 34.8% were non-families. 29.2% of all households were made up of individuals, and 14.3% had someone living alone who was 65 years of age or older. The average household size was 2.29 and the average family size was 2.80.

In the town, the population was spread out, with 22.0% under the age of 18, 5.4% from 18 to 24, 26.6% from 25 to 44, 28.8% from 45 to 64, and 17.2% who were 65 years of age or older. The median age was 42 years. For every 100 females, there were 101.3 males. For every 100 females age 18 and over, there were 99.0 males.

The median income for a household in the town was $28,036, and the median income for a family was $35,809. Males had a median income of $26,518 versus $19,353 for females. The per capita income for the town was $13,984. About 8.7% of families and 11.5% of the population were below the poverty line, including 12.5% of those under age 18 and 17.2% of those age 65 or over.

== Notable people ==
- Hiram Maxim, inventor of the first self-powered machine gun
- Sir Harry Oakes, 1st Baronet
