= Wellington, Maine =

Town in Maine, United States

- Town
- Location in Piscataquis County and the state of Maine
- Coordinates: 45°4′43″N 69°34′6″W
- Country: United States
- State: Maine
- County: Piscataquis

Area
  - Total: 39.93 sq mi (103.42 km^{2})
  - Land: 39.86 sq mi (103.24 km^{2})
  - Water: 0.069 sq mi (0.18 km^{2})
- Elevation: 735 ft (224 m)

Population (2020)
  - Total: 229
  - Density: 5.7/sq mi (2.2/km^{2})
- Time zone: UTC-5 (Eastern (EST))
  - Summer (DST): UTC-4 (EDT)
- ZIP Code: 04942
- Area code: 207
- FIPS code: 23-81405
- GNIS feature ID: 0579056
- Website: www.townofwellington.org

Wellington is a town in Piscataquis County, Maine, United States. The town was named for Arthur Wellesley, 1st Duke of Wellington. The population was 229 at the 2020 census.

== Geography ==
According to the United States Census Bureau, the town has a total area of 39.93 square miles (103.42 km^{2}), of which 39.86 square miles (103.24 km^{2}) is land and 0.07 square miles (0.18 km^{2}) is water.

== Demographics ==
Historical population
Census	Pop.	Note	%±
1830	639		—
1840	722		13.0%
1850	600		−16.9%
1860	694		15.7%
1870	681		−1.9%
1880	647		−5.0%
1890	584		−9.7%
1900	413		−29.3%
1910	393		−4.8%
1920	459		16.8%
1930	350		−23.7%
1940	261		−25.4%
1950	252		−3.4%
1960	231		−8.3%
1970	232		0.4%
1980	287		23.7%
1990	270		−5.9%
2000	258		−4.4%
2010	260		0.8%
2020	229		−11.9%
U.S. Decennial Census

=== 2010 census ===
As of the census of 2010, there were 260 people, 124 households, and 82 families living in the town. The population density was 6.5 inhabitants per square mile (2.5/km^{2}). There were 278 housing units at an average density of 7.0 per square mile (2.7/km^{2}). The racial makeup of the town was 97.3% White, 1.9% Pacific Islander, and 0.8% from two or more races.

There were 124 households, of which 18.5% had children under the age of 18 living with them, 54.0% were married couples living together, 8.1% had a female householder with no husband present, 4.0% had a male householder with no wife present, and 33.9% were non-families. 31.5% of all households were made up of individuals, and 11.3% had someone living alone who was 65 years of age or older. The average household size was 2.10 and the average family size was 2.54.

The median age in the town was 50.3 years. 15.4% of residents were under the age of 18; 4.2% were between the ages of 18 and 24; 21.9% were from 25 to 44; 34.5% were from 45 to 64; and 23.8% were 65 years of age or older. The gender makeup of the town was 50.0% male and 50.0% female.

=== 2000 census ===
As of the census of 2000, there were 258 people, 113 households, and 74 families living in the town. The population density was 6.5 people per square mile (2.5/km^{2}). There were 213 housing units at an average density of 5.3 per square mile (2.1/km^{2}). The racial makeup of the town was 99.61% White and 0.39% Native American. Hispanic or Latino people of any race were 1.55% of the population.

There were 113 households, out of which 21.2% had children under the age of 18 living with them, 53.1% were married couples living together, 8.0% had a female householder with no husband present, and 34.5% were non-families. 26.5% of all households were made up of individuals, and 13.3% had someone living alone who was 65 years of age or older. The average household size was 2.28 and the average family size was 2.68.

In the town, the population was spread out, with 20.9% under the age of 18, 5.8% from 18 to 24, 19.8% from 25 to 44, 36.0% from 45 to 64, and 17.4% who were 65 years of age or older. The median age was 47 years. For every 100 females, there were 115.0 males. For every 100 females age 18 and over, there were 108.2 males.

The median income for a household in the town was $17,083, and the median income for a family was $21,667. Males had a median income of $20,625 versus $16,875 for females. The per capita income for the town was $11,216. About 17.1% of families and 16.9% of the population were below the poverty line, including 5.3% of those under the age of eighteen and 26.0% of those 65 or over.
