= Greenville, Maine =

Town in Maine, United States

- Town
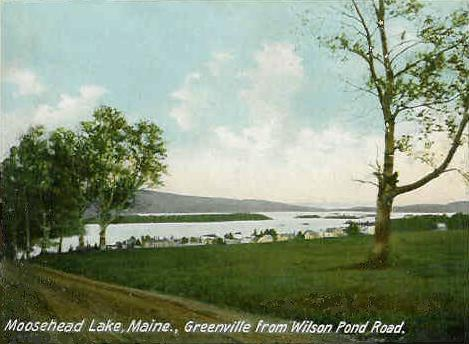
- Town view in 1907

- Seal

- Location in Piscataquis County and the state of Maine
- Coordinates: 45°28′40″N 69°33′53″W
- Country: United States
- State: Maine
- County: Piscataquis
- Incorporated: 1836

Area
  - Total: 46.13 sq mi (119.48 km^{2})
  - Land: 42.33 sq mi (109.63 km^{2})
  - Water: 3.80 sq mi (9.84 km^{2})
- Elevation: 1,394 ft (425 m)

Population (2020)
  - Total: 1,437
  - Density: 34/sq mi (13.1/km^{2})
- Time zone: UTC-5 (Eastern (EST))
  - Summer (DST): UTC-4 (EDT)
- ZIP Codes: 04441 (Greenville); 04442 (Greenville Junction)
- Area code: 207
- FIPS code: 23-29535
- GNIS feature ID: 0582502
- Website: greenvilleme.gov

Greenville is a town in Piscataquis County, Maine, United States. The population was 1,437 at the 2020 census. It contains a census-designated place of the same name. The town is centered on the lower end of Moosehead Lake, the largest body of fresh water in the state. Greenville is the historic gateway to the north country and a center for outdoor recreation in the area. Greenville High School, with 89 students, was ranked as the third best high school in Maine and one of the top 1,000 in the US in 2010.

== History ==
First called T9 R10 NWP (or Township 9, Range 10, North of the Waldo Patent), the land was granted about 1812 by the Massachusetts General Court to Thornton Academy in Saco. In 1824, Nathaniel Haskell of Westbrook bought the Thornton Academy Grant. With Oliver Young and John Smith, he began clearing trees that summer for farming near Wilson Pond, where the Wilson Stream would provide water power for mills.

In 1827, Haskell completed a house, and his family joined him. A sawmill was built on Wilson Stream in 1829, with a gristmill added the following year. In 1835, Henry Gower began clearing land beside Moosehead Lake for what would develop into Greenville village. There he erected the first hotel, a two-story building called the Seboomook House, and the first store. On February 6, 1836, Greenville was incorporated from Haskell Plantation, and named for its green forests. By 1846, Greenville village included two houses, two blacksmith shops and a schoolhouse. On August 10, 1848, the town annexed land from Wilson, the remainder of which was distributed to Shirley and Elliotsville.

A small steamboat was launched in 1836 to tow logs, and in 1838 the first large lake steamer began operation. In later years, a succession of steamers by the name of Katahdin plied the waters. The current S/S Katahdin was built in 1914. In July 1884, the Bangor and Piscataquis Railroad (later, the Bangor and Aroostook Railroad) arrived at Greenville Junction. The Canadian Pacific Railway's subsidiary the International Railway of Maine was built through the village in 1888. Tourists were attracted by the region's scenic beauty, hunting and fishing. Consequently, several inns and hotels were built, including the Piscataquis Exchange Hotel, the Squaw Mountain Inn and the Moosehead Inn. Steamboat service was available across Moosehead Lake to the grand Mount Kineo House on a peninsula at Mount Kineo. Today, Greenville remains a popular resort area.

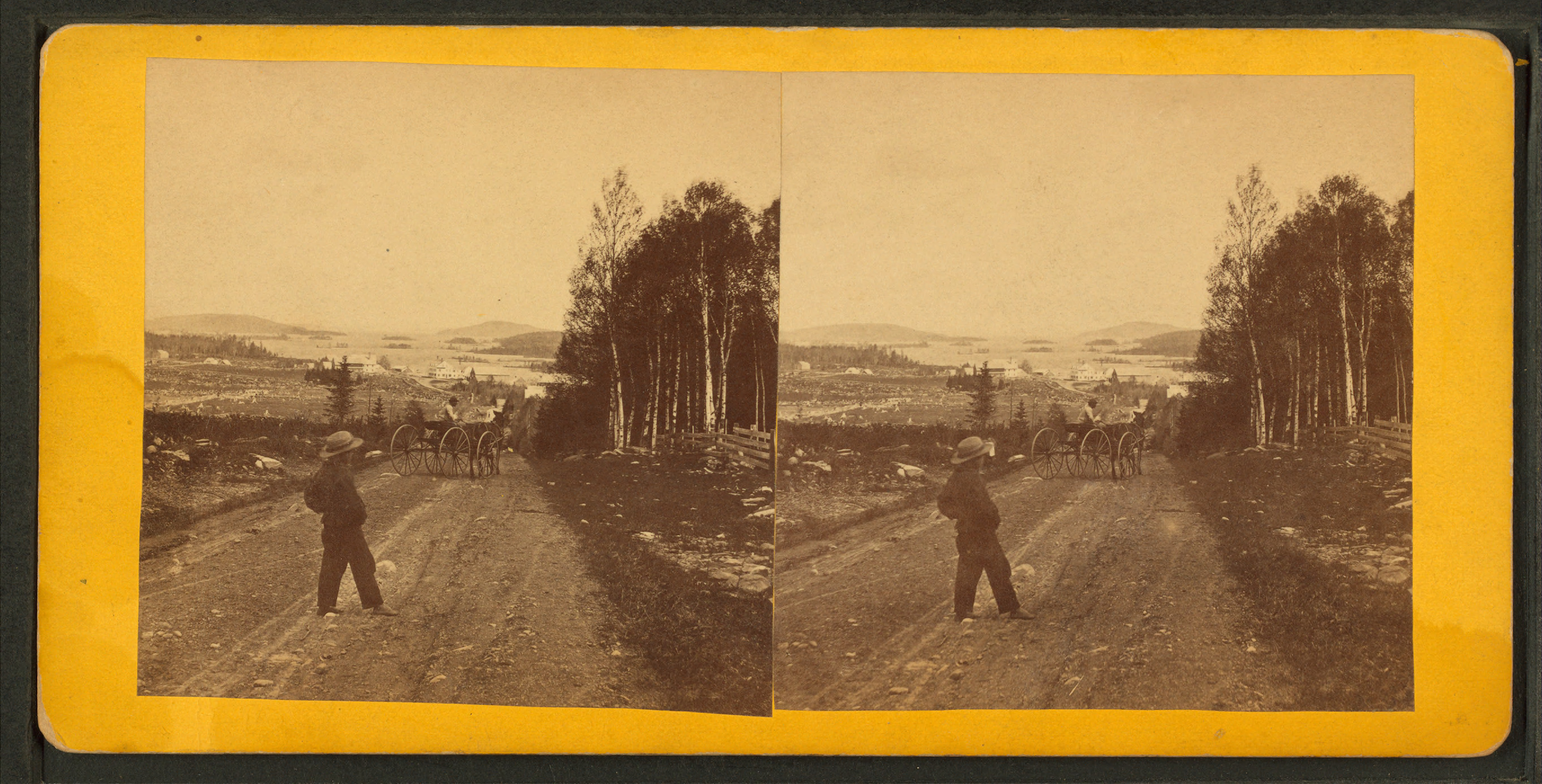
Moosehead Lake from Indian Hill c. 1875

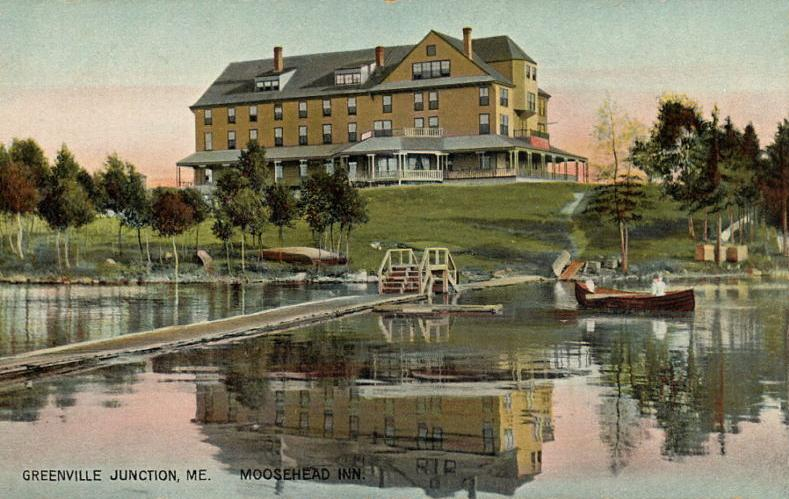
Moosehead Inn in 1908

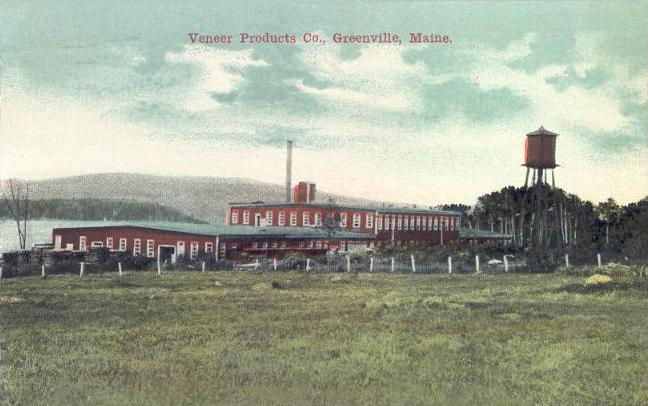
Veneer Products Co. in 1914

Greenville was in the path of totality of the total eclipse that occurred on April 8, 2024.

== Geography ==
According to the United States Census Bureau, the town has a total area of 46.13 square miles (119.48 km^{2}), of which 42.33 square miles (109.63 km^{2}) is land and 3.80 square miles (9.84 km^{2}) is water. Situated beside Moosehead Lake, Greenville is drained by Wilson Stream.

Located north of the 45th parallel on a line with Montreal, Greenville, in climate and vegetation, has more in common with the northernmost United States and southern Canada than it has with southern Maine.

=== Climate ===
This climatic region is typified by large seasonal temperature differences, with warm to hot (and often humid) summers and cold (sometimes severely cold) winters. According to the Köppen Climate Classification system, Greenville has a humid continental climate, abbreviated "Dfb" on climate maps.

Climate data for Greenville Municipal Airport, Maine (1037 ft); 1991–2020 normals, extremes 1920–present
Month	Jan	Feb	Mar	Apr	May	Jun	Jul	Aug	Sep	Oct	Nov	Dec	Year
Record high °F (°C)	58 (14)	55 (13)	76 (24)	85 (29)	90 (32)	95 (35)	95 (35)	96 (36)	92 (33)	84 (29)	74 (23)	59 (15)	96 (36)
Mean maximum °F (°C)	43.7 (6.5)	43.5 (6.4)	53.0 (11.7)	69.9 (21.1)	81.8 (27.7)	85.5 (29.7)	86.6 (30.3)	85.6 (29.8)	81.7 (27.6)	71.7 (22.1)	59.7 (15.4)	48.0 (8.9)	88.9 (31.6)
Mean daily maximum °F (°C)	22.9 (−5.1)	25.3 (−3.7)	34.4 (1.3)	46.4 (8.0)	61.5 (16.4)	70.2 (21.2)	75.4 (24.1)	74.1 (23.4)	66.1 (18.9)	52.5 (11.4)	39.3 (4.1)	28.3 (−2.1)	49.7 (9.8)
Daily mean °F (°C)	14.2 (−9.9)	16.3 (−8.7)	25.6 (−3.6)	38.0 (3.3)	51.4 (10.8)	60.7 (15.9)	66.3 (19.1)	64.8 (18.2)	57.2 (14.0)	44.9 (7.2)	32.9 (0.5)	21.5 (−5.8)	41.2 (5.1)
Mean daily minimum °F (°C)	5.4 (−14.8)	7.3 (−13.7)	16.8 (−8.4)	29.5 (−1.4)	41.3 (5.2)	51.2 (10.7)	57.2 (14.0)	55.5 (13.1)	48.3 (9.1)	37.3 (2.9)	26.5 (−3.1)	14.6 (−9.7)	32.6 (0.3)
Mean minimum °F (°C)	−13.4 (−25.2)	−10.5 (−23.6)	−4.5 (−20.3)	17.6 (−8.0)	30.3 (−0.9)	40.2 (4.6)	48.3 (9.1)	45.7 (7.6)	35.2 (1.8)	25.5 (−3.6)	11.5 (−11.4)	−4.1 (−20.1)	−16.5 (−26.9)
Record low °F (°C)	−36 (−38)	−42 (−41)	−27 (−33)	−8 (−22)	18 (−8)	24 (−4)	27 (−3)	30 (−1)	20 (−7)	10 (−12)	−6 (−21)	−32 (−36)	−42 (−41)
Average precipitation inches (mm)	2.98 (76)	2.41 (61)	3.19 (81)	3.59 (91)	3.59 (91)	4.04 (103)	4.01 (102)	3.96 (101)	3.44 (87)	5.00 (127)	3.96 (101)	4.33 (110)	44.50 (1,130)
Average precipitation days (≥ 0.01 in)	13.0	11.8	12.8	13.4	13.5	14.1	14.2	13.1	10.6	13.7	13.7	15.8	159.7
Source 1: NOAA
Source 2: National Weather Service

== Demographics ==
Historical population
Census	Pop.	Note	%±
1840	128		—
1850	326		154.7%
1860	310		−4.9%
1870	369		19.0%
1880	586		58.8%
1890	781		33.3%
1900	1,117		43.0%
1910	1,474		32.0%
1920	1,550		5.2%
1930	1,615		4.2%
1940	1,955		21.1%
1950	1,889		−3.4%
1960	2,025		7.2%
1970	1,894		−6.5%
1980	1,839		−2.9%
1990	1,884		2.4%
2000	1,623		−13.9%
2010	1,646		1.4%
2020	1,437		−12.7%
U.S. Decennial Census

=== 2010 census ===
As of the census of 2010, there were 1,646 people, 820 households, and 480 families residing in the town. The population density was 38.9 inhabitants per square mile (15.0/km^{2}). There were 1,661 housing units at an average density of 39.2 per square mile (15.1/km^{2}). The racial makeup of the town was 98.3% White, 0.4% Native American, 0.2% Asian, 0.3% from other races, and 0.7% from two or more races. Hispanic or Latino people of any race were 0.5% of the population.

There were 820 households, of which 19.4% had children under the age of 18 living with them, 48.4% were married couples living together, 7.0% had a female householder with no husband present, 3.2% had a male householder with no wife present, and 41.5% were non-families. 35.5% of all households were made up of individuals, and 15.3% had someone living alone who was 65 years of age or older. The average household size was 1.98 and the average family size was 2.51.

The median age in the town was 52.3 years. 15.9% of residents were under the age of 18; 4.1% were between the ages of 18 and 24; 18.4% were from 25 to 44; 37.7% were from 45 to 64; and 24.2% were 65 years of age or older. The gender makeup of the town was 48.3% male and 51.7% female.

=== 2000 census ===
As of the census of 2000, there were 1,623 people, 731 households, and 437 families residing in the town. The population density was 38.2 inhabitants per square mile (14.7/km^{2}). There were 1,378 housing units at an average density of 32.4 per square mile (12.5/km^{2}). The racial makeup of the town was 98.77% White, 0.12% Black or African American, 0.31% Native American, 0.25% Asian, 0.06% from other races, and 0.49% from two or more races. Hispanic or Latino people of any race were 0.25% of the population.

There were 731 households, out of which 29.5% had children under the age of 18 living with them, 48.6% were married couples living together, 8.1% had a female householder with no husband present, and 40.1% were non-families. 34.9% of all households were made up of individuals, and 20.5% had someone living alone who was 65 years of age or older. The average household size was 2.19 and the average family size was 2.82.

In the town, the population was spread out, with 24.0% under the age of 18, 4.0% from 18 to 24, 25.1% from 25 to 44, 26.7% from 45 to 64, and 20.1% who were 65 years of age or older. The median age was 43 years. For every 100 females, there were 91.6 males. For every 100 females age 18 and over, there were 89.4 males.

The median income for a household in the town was $30,365, and the median income for a family was $36,694. Males had a median income of $27,955 versus $19,712 for females. The per capita income for the town was $16,638. About 8.9% of families and 12.9% of the population were below the poverty line, including 14.9% of those under age 18 and 15.8% of those age 65 or over.
