= Lake View Plantation, Maine =

- Plantation
- Location in Piscataquis County and the state of Maine
- Coordinates: 45°21′46″N 68°53′20″W
- Country: United States
- State: Maine
- County: Piscataquis

Area
  - Total: 53.2 sq mi (137.7 km^{2})
  - Land: 41.5 sq mi (107.4 km^{2})
  - Water: 11.7 sq mi (30.3 km^{2})
- Elevation: 581 ft (177 m)

Population (2020)
  - Total: 150
  - Density: 3.6/sq mi (1.4/km^{2})
- Time zone: UTC-5 (Eastern (EST))
  - Summer (DST): UTC-4 (EDT)
- ZIP Codes: 04463 (Milo); 04414 (Brownville)
- Area code: 207
- FIPS code: 23-37970
- GNIS feature ID: 0582547
- Website: www.lakeviewpltme.org

Lake View Plantation is a plantation in Piscataquis County, Maine, United States. The population was 150 at the 2020 census.

== Geography ==
According to the United States Census Bureau, the plantation has a total area of 53.2 square miles (138 km^{2}) of which 41.5 square miles (107 km^{2}) is land and 11.7 square miles (30 km^{2}) (22.01%) is water.

== Demographics ==
Historical population
Census	Pop.	Note	%±
1900	173		—
1910	245		41.6%
1920	368		50.2%
1930	57		−84.5%
1940	70		22.8%
1950	23		−67.1%
1960	18		−21.7%
1970	16		−11.1%
1980	20		25.0%
1990	23		15.0%
2000	43		87.0%
2010	89		107.0%
2020	150		68.5%
U.S. Decennial Census

At the 2000 census, there were 43 people, 25 households and 12 families residing in the plantation. The population density was 1.0 inhabitant per square mile (0.39/km^{2}). There were 425 housing units at an average density of 10.2 per square mile (3.9/km^{2}). The racial makeup of the plantation was 97.67% White, and 2.33% from two or more races.

There were 25 households, of which 4.0% had children under the age of 18 living with them, 48.0% were married couples living together, and 52.0% were non-families. 40.0% of all households were made up of individuals, and 16.0% had someone living alone who was 65 years of age or older. The average household size was 1.72 and the average family size was 2.25.

2.3% of the population were under the age of 18, 4.7% from 18 to 24, 25.6% from 25 to 44, 48.8% from 45 to 64, and 18.6% who were 65 years of age or older. The median age was 52 years. For every 100 females, there were 138.9 males. For every 100 females age 18 and over, there were 133.3 males.

The median household income was $18,125 and the median family income for was $19,375. Males had a median income of $26,250 compared with $13,750 for females. The per capita income for the plantation was $19,403. There were no families and 6.9% of the population living below the poverty line, including no under eighteens and 22.2% of those over 64.
