= Piscataquis County, Maine =

County in Maine, United States

- County
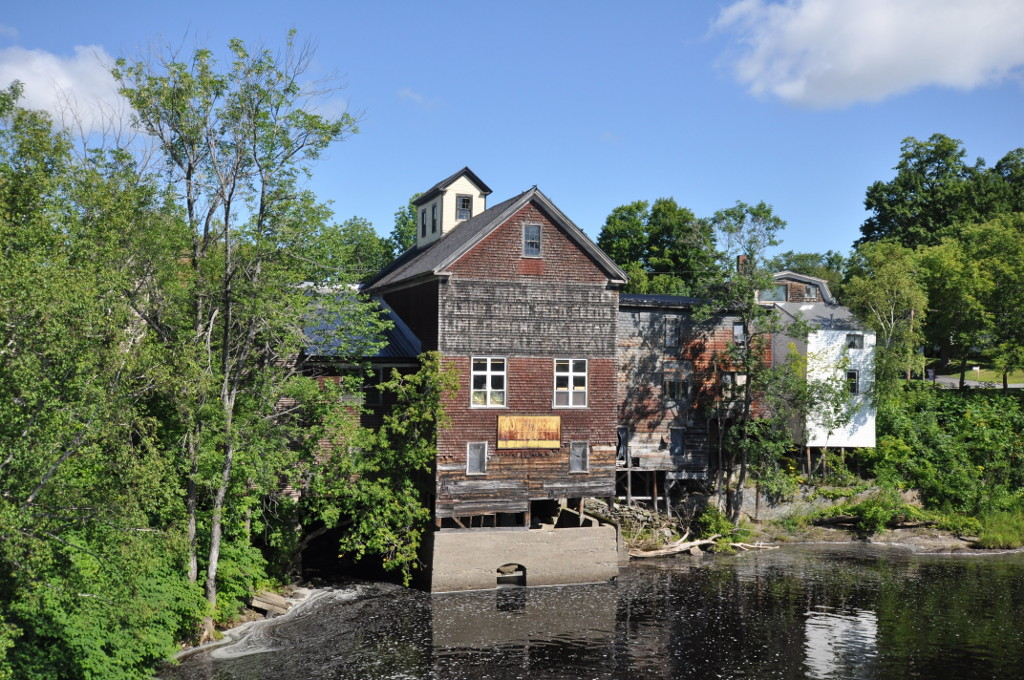
- American Woolen Company Foxcroft Mill

- Location within the U.S. state of Maine
- Coordinates: 45°33′55″N 69°20′01″W
- Country: United States
- State: Maine
- Founded: March 23, 1838
- Named for: Piscataquis River
- Seat: Dover-Foxcroft
- Largest town: Dover-Foxcroft

Area
  - Total: 4,378 sq mi (11,340 km^{2})
  - Land: 3,961 sq mi (10,260 km^{2})
  - Water: 417 sq mi (1,080 km^{2}) 9.5%

Population (2020)
  - Total: 16,800
  - Estimate (2025): 17,409 ▲
  - Density: 4.24/sq mi (1.64/km^{2})
- Time zone: UTC−5 (Eastern)
  - Summer (DST): UTC−4 (EDT)
- Congressional district: 2nd
- Website: piscataquis.us

Piscataquis County (/pɪˈskætəkwɪs/ pih-SKAT-ə-kwiss) is a county located in the U.S. state of Maine. As of the 2020 census, its population was 16,800, making it Maine's least-populous county. Its county seat is Dover-Foxcroft. The county was incorporated on March 23, 1838, taken from the western part of Penobscot County and the eastern part of Somerset County. It is named for an Abenaki word meaning "branch of the river" or "at the river branch."

Originally, the county extended north to the Canada–US border, but in 1844 its northern portion was annexed by Aroostook County. In terms of land area, Piscataquis is one of the largest U.S. counties east of the Mississippi River. It is also one of two counties in the Northeast (and seven counties east of the Mississippi River) (Note: The others are Lake County and Cook County in Minnesota, Ontonagon County and Keweenaw County in Michigan, Issaquena County in Mississippi, and Highland County in Virginia) that meet Frederick Jackson Turner's requirements for "frontier" country – that is, having fewer than six inhabitants per square mile, the other being Hamilton County, New York.

Baxter State Park, a large wilderness preserve, is located in Piscataquis County.

== History ==
In June 1799, near Piscataquis County's three major rivers, people started clearing land and settling there.

In 1883, the Monson Railroad, a two-foot gauge commoner railroad, began operating in the county. It would be the last operating railroad of its type in North America.

From the 1970s to the 1990s, paper companies' land in the county was heavily harvested.

== Geography ==
According to the U.S. Census Bureau, the county has a total area of 4,378 square miles (11,340 km^{2}), of which 3,961 square miles (10,260 km^{2}) is land and 417 square miles (1,080 km^{2}) (9.5%) is water. It is the second-largest county in Maine by area. The largest lake in the county is Moosehead Lake (the state's largest) at 120 square miles (310 km^{2}). The highest natural point in the county and the state of Maine is Mount Katahdin at 5,271 feet (1,607 meters), while the geographic center is Greeley Landing in the Town of Dover-Foxcroft.

=== Adjacent counties ===
- Aroostook County – north
- Penobscot County – southeast
- Somerset County – west

== Demographics ==
Historical population
Census	Pop.	Note	%±
1840	13,138		—
1850	14,735		12.2%
1860	15,032		2.0%
1870	14,403		−4.2%
1880	14,872		3.3%
1890	16,134		8.5%
1900	16,949		5.1%
1910	19,887		17.3%
1920	20,554		3.4%
1930	18,231		−11.3%
1940	18,467		1.3%
1950	18,617		0.8%
1960	17,379		−6.6%
1970	16,285		−6.3%
1980	17,634		8.3%
1990	18,653		5.8%
2000	17,235		−7.6%
2010	17,535		1.7%
2020	16,800		−4.2%
2025 (est.)	17,409	▲	3.6%
U.S. Decennial Census; 1790–1960 1900–1990; 1990–2000 2010–2016

=== 2020 census ===
As of the 2020 census, the county had a population of 16,800. Of the residents, 17.3% were under the age of 18 and 27.5% were 65 years of age or older; the median age was 52.0 years. For every 100 females there were 98.4 males, and for every 100 females age 18 and over there were 97.6 males. 0.0% of residents lived in urban areas and 100.0% lived in rural areas.

The racial makeup of the county was 92.7% White, 0.4% Black or African American, 0.7% American Indian and Alaska Native, 0.7% Asian, 0.0% Native Hawaiian and Pacific Islander, 0.7% from some other race, and 4.8% from two or more races. Hispanic or Latino residents of any race comprised 1.6% of the population.

There were 7,615 households in the county, of which 21.1% had children under the age of 18 living with them and 23.5% had a female householder with no spouse or partner present. About 32.4% of all households were made up of individuals and 17.8% had someone living alone who was 65 years of age or older.

There were 14,577 housing units, of which 47.8% were vacant. Among occupied housing units, 76.8% were owner-occupied and 23.2% were renter-occupied. The homeowner vacancy rate was 3.4% and the rental vacancy rate was 9.6%.

Piscataquis County, Maine – Racial and ethnic composition Note: the US Census treats Hispanic/Latino as an ethnic category. This table excludes Latinos from the racial categories and assigns them to a separate category. Hispanics/Latinos may be of any race.
Race / Ethnicity (NH = Non-Hispanic)	Pop 2000	Pop 2010	Pop 2020	% 2000	% 2010	% 2020
White alone (NH)	16,801	16,893	15,474	97.48%	96.33%	92.10%
Black or African American alone (NH)	36	52	57	0.20%	0.29%	0.33%
Native American or Alaska Native alone (NH)	89	90	102	0.51%	0.51%	0.60%
Asian alone (NH)	46	128	120	0.26%	0.72%	0.71%
Pacific Islander alone (NH)	3	7	7	0.01%	0.03%	0.04%
Other race alone (NH)	6	12	66	0.03%	0.06%	0.39%
Mixed race or Multiracial (NH)	165	184	713	0.95%	1.04%	4.24%
Hispanic or Latino (any race)	89	169	261	0.51%	0.96%	1.55%
Total	17,235	17,535	16,800	100.00%	100.00%	100.00%

=== 2010 census ===
As of the 2010 United States census, there were 17,535 people, 7,825 households, and 4,948 families residing in the county. The population density was 4.4 inhabitants per square mile (1.7 inhabitants/km^{2}). There were 15,340 housing units at an average density of 3.9 units per square mile (1.5 units/km^{2}). The racial makeup of the county was 96.9% white, 0.7% Asian, 0.5% American Indian, 0.3% black or African American, 0.3% from other races, and 1.2% from two or more races. Those of Hispanic or Latino origin made up 1.0% of the population. In terms of ancestry, 21.4% were English, 16.5% were Irish, 13.6% were American, 8.7% were German, 5.5% were Scottish, and 5.3% were French Canadian.

Of the 7,825 households, 23.6% had children under the age of 18 living with them, 50.1% were married couples living together, 8.5% had a female householder with no husband present, 36.8% were non-families, and 30.5% of all households were made up of individuals. The average household size was 2.21 and the average family size was 2.70. The median age was 48.1 years.

The median income for a household in the county was $34,016 and the median income for a family was $43,821. Males had a median income of $34,575 versus $28,014 for females. The per capita income for the county was $19,870. About 12.3% of families and 16.2% of the population were below the poverty line, including 24.9% of those under age 18 and 12.6% of those age 65 or over.

=== 2000 census ===
As of the 2000 census, there were 17,235 people, 7,278 households, and 4,854 families residing in the county. The population density was 4 people per square mile (1.5 people/km^{2}). There were 13,783 housing units at an average density of 4 per square mile (1.5/km^{2}). The racial makeup of the county was 97.84% White, 0.21% Black or African American, 0.52% Native American, 0.27% Asian, 0.02% Pacific Islander, 0.14% from other races, and 1.00% from two or more races. 0.52% of the population were Hispanic or Latino of any race. 23.6% were of English, 16.4% French, 15.3% United States or American and 11.5% Irish ancestry according to Census 2000. 96.9% spoke English and 2.0% French as their first language.

There were 7,278 households, out of which 28.60% had children under the age of 18 living with them, 54.10% were married couples living together, 8.40% had a female householder with no husband present, and 33.30% were non-families. 27.80% of all households were made up of individuals, and 14.00% had someone living alone who was 65 years of age or older. The average household size was 2.34 and the average family size was 2.83.

In the county, the population was spread out, with 23.40% under the age of 18, 5.70% from 18 to 24, 26.00% from 25 to 44, 27.50% from 45 to 64, and 17.40% who were 65 years of age or older. The median age was 42 years. For every 100 females there were 96.40 males. For every 100 females age 18 and over, there were 95.20 males.

The median income for a household in the county was $28,250, and the median income for a family was $34,852. Males had a median income of $28,149 versus $20,241 for females. The per capita income for the county was $14,374. About 11.20% of families and 14.80% of the population were below the poverty line, including 17.80% of those under age 18 and 13.90% of those age 65 or over.

=== Religion ===
Piscataquis County has one of the lowest rates of religious adherence in the United States. The county ranks at 3,085 of 3,148 counties (lowest 2%), with 20.5% of the population regularly attending congregations or claiming religious membership.

In Maine, Piscataquis County ranks tenth of the 16 counties in percentage of religious adherents. The State of Maine has the lowest percentage of religious adherents in the United States at 27%.

== Government and politics ==
=== County officials ===
The following individuals hold county offices:

- County Manager: Michael Williams
- County Treasurer: Tricia White
- Mayor: Paul Paydos
- Finance Administrator: Kathy Walsh
- Sheriff: Robert Young
- EMA Director: Debra Hamlin
- Probate Register: Donna Peterson
- Deeds Register: Gail Clark
- District Attorney: R. Chris Almy
- DA Administrative Assistant: Corinna Rackliff
- Facilities Director: Josh York
- Judge of Probate: Benjamin Cabot

=== County Commissioners and Districts ===
Piscataquis County is administered by three County Commissioners, each representing one of the three county districts. They are elected for four-year terms. A term of office begins on January 1 following the election in November. County Commissioner meetings are typically held on the 1st and 3rd Tuesdays of the month at the County Courthouse in Dover-Foxcroft. The meetings begin at 8:30 a.m. and continue until the agenda for the meeting has been addressed.

District 1 includes the towns of Abbot, Beaver Cove, Greenville, Guilford, Kingsbury Plt, Monson, Parkman, Shirley, Wellington and the Unorganized Territories of Blanchard, Elliotsville and Northwest Piscataquis. Eric P. Ward is the Commissioner.

District 2 includes the towns of Dover-Foxcroft, Sangerville and Willimantic. James D. Annis is the Commissioner.

District 3 includes the towns of Bowerbank, Brownville, Lake View Plt, Medford, Milo, Sebec and the Unorganized Territories of Atkinson, Barnard, Ebeeme, Katahdin Iron Works, Orneville, Williamsburg and Northeast Piscataquis County. Frederick Trask is the Commissioner.

=== Voter registration ===
Voter registration and party enrollment as of March 2024
Republican	4,884	42.18%
Unenrolled	3,330	28.76%
Democratic	2,545	21.98%
Green Independent	466	4.02%
No Labels	313	2.7%
Libertarian	42	0.36%
Total	11,580	100%

=== Elections ===
==== Governor ====
In the Maine gubernatorial election, 2010, Republican candidate Paul LePage received the most votes in Piscataquis County with 48.4%. Three Independent candidates ran in this election: Eliot Cutler received the second most Piscatquis votes with 36.5% of the total, Shawn Moody received 3.1% and Kevin Scott, 1%. Democratic candidate, Libby Mitchell received the third most votes in the county with 10.9% of the total. Paul LePage was elected governor. In the Maine gubernatorial election, 2006, Republican candidate Chandler Woodcock received the most votes in Piscataquis County with 37.7%. Democratic candidate, incumbent governor John Baldacci received 34.5%. Independent candidate Barbara Merrill received 19.7%, Green party candidate Pat LaMarche received 7.4%, and Phillip Morris NaPier received .63% of the Piscataquis vote. John Baldacci was reelected governor.

In the Maine gubernatorial election, 2002, Democratic candidate John Baldacci received the most votes in Piscataquis County with 50.4%. Republican candidate Peter Cianchette received 42.9% of the county vote and Green Party candidate, Jonathan Carter received 5.1%. John Baldacci was elected governor. In the Maine gubernatorial election, 1998, Independent candidate Angus King received the most votes in Piscataquis County with 50.2%. Republican candidate James Longley, Jr. received 26.6%, Democratic candidate Tom Connolly received 10.7%. Other candidates split 12.5% of the vote. Angus King was elected governor.

Gubernatorial election results for Piscataquis County, Maine
Year	Republican		Democratic		Third party(ies)	
Year	No.	%	No.	%	No.	%
2022	4,960	60.37%	3,098	37.71%	158	1.92%
2018	4,075	55.02%	2,868	38.73%	463	6.25%
2014	4,736	57.90%	2,810	34.36%	633	7.74%
2010	3,724	48.45%	837	10.89%	3,125	40.66%
2006	2,829	37.71%	2,591	34.54%	2,082	27.75%
2002	3,045	43.56%	3,583	51.26%	362	5.18%
1998	1,752	26.56%	708	10.73%	4,137	62.71%
1994	2,649	34.67%	2,206	28.87%	2,786	36.46%
1990	4,177	51.08%	3,213	39.29%	787	9.62%

==== US Senate ====
United States Senate election results for Piscataquis County, Maine1
Year	Republican		Democratic		Third party(ies)	
Year	No.	%	No.	%	No.	%
2024	4,943	48.92%	595	5.89%	4,566	45.19%
2018	3,579	47.75%	534	7.12%	3,383	45.13%
2012	3,522	40.08%	911	10.37%	4,354	49.55%

United States Senate election results for Piscataquis County, Maine2
Year	Republican		Democratic		Third party(ies)	
Year	No.	%	No.	%	No.	%
2020	6,603	67.64%	2,655	27.20%	504	5.16%
2014	6,174	76.77%	1,862	23.15%	6	0.07%

==== President ====
United States presidential election results for Piscataquis County, Maine
Year	Republican		Democratic		Third party(ies)	
Year	No.	%	No.	%	No.	%
1880	1,943	56.83%	1,330	38.90%	146	4.27%
1884	1,976	58.02%	1,169	34.32%	261	7.66%
1888	2,091	60.35%	1,297	37.43%	77	2.22%
1892	1,909	58.02%	1,249	37.96%	132	4.01%
1896	2,342	70.37%	904	27.16%	82	2.46%
1900	2,023	67.50%	824	27.49%	150	5.01%
1904	2,043	74.51%	616	22.47%	83	3.03%
1908	2,157	70.49%	828	27.06%	75	2.45%
1912	807	21.41%	1,210	32.10%	1,753	46.50%
1916	2,142	54.16%	1,763	44.58%	50	1.26%
1920	4,049	68.79%	1,788	30.38%	49	0.83%
1924	4,031	75.94%	974	18.35%	303	5.71%
1928	4,792	77.78%	1,353	21.96%	16	0.26%
1932	4,198	59.14%	2,849	40.13%	52	0.73%
1936	4,057	55.61%	3,051	41.82%	187	2.56%
1940	3,806	52.05%	3,499	47.85%	7	0.10%
1944	3,536	54.45%	2,957	45.53%	1	0.02%
1948	3,227	59.34%	2,181	40.11%	30	0.55%
1952	4,652	67.20%	2,261	32.66%	10	0.14%
1956	5,336	77.59%	1,541	22.41%	0	0.00%
1960	4,959	63.43%	2,859	36.57%	0	0.00%
1964	2,473	34.06%	4,781	65.84%	7	0.10%
1968	3,199	46.24%	3,561	51.47%	158	2.28%
1972	4,617	64.70%	2,518	35.29%	1	0.01%
1976	4,084	50.48%	3,727	46.07%	279	3.45%
1980	4,015	46.93%	3,550	41.50%	990	11.57%
1984	5,427	63.98%	3,016	35.56%	39	0.46%
1988	4,788	58.27%	3,323	40.44%	106	1.29%
1992	2,970	29.61%	3,323	33.13%	3,738	37.26%
1996	2,815	31.56%	4,343	48.69%	1,762	19.75%
2000	4,845	52.34%	3,745	40.46%	666	7.20%
2004	5,299	53.31%	4,409	44.36%	232	2.33%
2008	4,785	50.72%	4,430	46.96%	219	2.32%
2012	4,530	50.59%	4,149	46.33%	276	3.08%
2016	5,406	58.88%	3,098	33.74%	678	7.38%
2020	6,143	62.00%	3,517	35.50%	248	2.50%
2024	6,487	63.57%	3,510	34.39%	208	2.04%

Piscataquis County is one of the most reliably Republican counties in New England, only voting for a someone other than the Republican candidate five times since 1880 — voting for Bull Moose Party nominee Theodore Roosevelt (a former Republican) in 1912, Democrats Lyndon B. Johnson and Hubert Humphrey in 1964 and 1968 respectively, independent Ross Perot in 1992, and Democrat Bill Clinton in 1996.

Since 2000, Piscataquis County has maintained its strong Republican lean, continuing to be the most reliably Republican county in Maine, and New England. In 2008, Piscataquis was the only county in New England to vote for John McCain, who won the county by a margin of 355 votes or 3.8% over Barack Obama, with Obama winning Maine by a 17.3% margin over McCain. In 2012, Piscataquis was only one of five counties in New England to support Republican candidate Mitt Romney, and the only county in Maine to do so. Romney received the most votes in Piscataquis County with 50.6%. Democratic incumbent Barack Obama received 46.3%. Libertarian candidate Gary Johnson received 1.5% and Green Independent candidate Jill Stein received 1.24%. There were a total of 30 "write in" votes; 29 of these were for Ron Paul and 1 for Rocky Anderson. Barack Obama was reelected President. This makes the county the only one in New England to reject President Obama in both of his successful campaigns. Republican candidate Donald Trump carried the county in 2016 while greatly improving on Romney's performance. He won it again in 2020 with 62% of the vote, marking the first time a presidential candidate from any party won Piscataquis County with over 60% of the vote since Ronald Reagan in 1984.

== Communities ==
=== Towns ===
- Abbot
- Beaver Cove
- Bowerbank
- Brownville
- Dover-Foxcroft (county seat)
- Greenville
- Guilford
- Medford
- Milo
- Monson
- Parkman
- Sangerville
- Sebec
- Shirley
- Wellington
- Willimantic

=== Plantations ===
- Kingsbury Plantation
- Lake View Plantation

=== Census-designated places ===
- Brownville Junction
- Dover-Foxcroft
- Greenville
- Guilford
- Milo

=== Survey Townships ===
- T1-R9 WELS

=== Unorganized territories ===
- Atkinson
- Blanchard
- Southeast Piscataquis
- Northeast Piscataquis
- Northwest Piscataquis

== Education ==
School districts include:

- Beaver Cove School District
- Bowerbank School District
- Greenville School District
- Kingsbury Plantation School District
- Lake View Plantation School District
- Medford School District
- Shirley School District
- Willimantic School District
- School Administrative District 04
- School Administrative District 41
- School Administrative District 68

Some portions are in the Piscataquis Unorganized Territory, which is not in any municipality. The Maine Department of Education takes responsibility for coordinating school assignments in the unorganized territory. The department operates one school, Kingman Elementary School, in Kingman.

== Notable people ==
- Berenice Abbott, photographer
- David Mallett, singer-songwriter
- Sir Hiram Stevens Maxim, inventor
- Sir Harry Oakes, philanthropist
- Roxanne Quimby, businesswoman
- Max Schubel, composer
- Oswald Tippo, botanist

== See also ==
- National Register of Historic Places listings in Piscataquis County, Maine
