= Abbot, Maine =

Town in Maine, United States

- Town
- Location in Piscataquis County and the state of Maine
- Coordinates: 45°12′6″N 69°27′44″W
- Country: United States
- State: Maine
- County: Piscataquis

Area
  - Total: 35.70 sq mi (92.46 km^{2})
  - Land: 34.53 sq mi (89.43 km^{2})
  - Water: 1.17 sq mi (3.03 km^{2})
- Elevation: 482 ft (147 m)

Population (2020)
  - Total: 650
  - Density: 19/sq mi (7.3/km^{2})
- Time zone: UTC-5 (Eastern (EST))
  - Summer (DST): UTC-4 (EDT)
- ZIP code: 04406
- Area code: 207
- FIPS code: 23-00100
- GNIS feature ID: 0582314

Abbot is a town in Piscataquis County, Maine, United States. The population was 650 at the 2020 census. It was named for the treasurer of Bowdoin College, John Abbot.

== Geography ==
According to the United States Census Bureau, the town has a total area of 35.70 square miles (92.46 km^{2}), of which 34.53 square miles (89.43 km^{2}) is land and 1.17 square miles (3.03 km^{2}) is water.

== Demographics ==
Historical population
Census	Pop.	Note	%±
1830	405		—
1840	661		63.2%
1850	747		13.0%
1860	796		6.6%
1870	712		−10.6%
1880	695		−2.4%
1890	622		−10.5%
1900	716		15.1%
1910	705		−1.5%
1920	572		−18.9%
1930	525		−8.2%
1940	466		−11.2%
1950	462		−0.9%
1960	404		−12.6%
1970	453		12.1%
1980	576		27.2%
1990	677		17.5%
2000	630		−6.9%
2010	714		13.3%
2020	650		−9.0%
U.S. Decennial Census

=== 2010 census ===
As of the census of 2010, there were 714 people, 311 households, and 214 families living in the town. The population density was 20.7 inhabitants per square mile (8.0/km^{2}). There were 572 housing units at an average density of 16.6 per square mile (6.4/km^{2}). The racial makeup of the town was 98.3% White, 0.1% African American, 0.1% Native American, 0.1% Asian, and 1.3% from two or more races. Hispanic or Latino people of any race were 0.6% of the population.

There were 311 households, of which 23.5% had children under the age of 18 living with them, 56.6% were married couples living together, 8.0% had a female householder with no husband present, 4.2% had a male householder with no wife present, and 31.2% were non-families. 24.8% of all households were made up of individuals, and 10% had someone living alone who was 65 years of age or older. The average household size was 2.25 and the average family size was 2.62.

The median age in the town was 49.3 years. 17.2% of residents were under the age of 18; 4.9% were between the ages of 18 and 24; 20.3% were from 25 to 44; 39.1% were from 45 to 64; and 18.5% were 65 years of age or older. The gender makeup of the town was 48.3% male and 51.7% female.

=== 2000 census ===
As of the census of 2000, there were 630 people, 272 households, and 196 families living in the town. The population density was 18.1 people per square mile (7.0/km^{2}). There were 461 housing units at an average density of 13.3 per square mile (5.1/km^{2}). The racial makeup of the town was 98.25% White, 0.16% African American, 0.63% Native American, 0.16% Pacific Islander, 0.48% from other races, and 0.32% from two or more races.

There were 272 households, out of which 24.6% had children under the age of 18 living with them, 58.8% were married couples living together, 8.1% had a female householder with no husband present, and 27.9% were non-families. 21.7% of all households were made up of individuals, and 9.9% had someone living alone who was 65 years of age or older. The average household size was 2.32 and the average family size was 2.68.

In the town, the population was spread out with 19.5% under the age of 18, 4.4% from 18 to 24, 27.8% from 25 to 44, 32.5% from 45 to 64, and 15.7% who were 65 years of age or older. The median age was 44 years. For every 100 females, there were 98.7 males. For every 100 females age 18 and over, there were 99.6 males.

The median income for a household in the town was $33,229, and the median income for a family was $36,827. Males had a median income of $29,000 versus $22,955 for females. The per capita income for the town was $16,001. About 6.4% of families and 10.2% of the population were below the poverty line, including 10.8% of those under age 18 and 20.5% of those age 65 or over.

Voter registration

Voter registration and party enrollment as of November 2012
Party	Total voters	Percentage
Republican	195	39.6%
Unenrolled	171	34.8%
Democratic	112	22.8%
Green Independent	14	2.8%
Total	492	100%
