= List of museums in Maine =

This list of museums in Maine is a list of museums, defined for this context as institutions (including nonprofit organizations, government entities, and private businesses) that collect and care for objects of cultural, artistic, scientific, or historical interest and make their collections or related exhibits available for public viewing. Non-profit and university art galleries are also included. Museums that exist only in cyberspace (i.e., virtual museums) are not included.

== Museums ==
Name	Location	County	Region	Type	Website, Notes
1811 Lincoln County Museum and Old Jail	Wiscasset	Lincoln	Mid Coast	Prison	Operated by the Lincoln County Historical Association
Kennebunkport Maritime Museum	Kennebunkport	York	Southern Maine Coast	Maritime	Formerly the boathouse of Booth Tarkington
Abbe Museum	Bar Harbor	Hancock	Down East	Native American	History, culture and crafts of the Wabanaki, two locations
Abbot Historical Society Museum	Abbot	Piscataquis	Maine Highlands	Local history	Museum in the former Knights of Pythias Hall
Abbott Museum	Dexter	Penobscot	Maine Highlands	Local history	Operated by the Dexter Historical Society (information)
Acadian Village	Van Buren	Aroostook	Maine Lake Country	Open air	Historic village buildings reflect the cultural heritage of the Acadians, open seasonally
Alexander-Crawford Historical Society	Alexander	Washington	Down East	Local history	Open by appointment (information)
Alfred Shaker Museum	Alfred	York	Southern Maine Coast	Religion	Run by the Friends of the Alfred Shaker Museum, ongoing restoration of the Shaker Wood, Lumber Storage, and Carriage House
Allagash Historical Museum	Allagash	Aroostook	Maine Lake Country	Local history	Operated by the Allagash Historical Society, open weekends in summer
Androscoggin Historical Society	Auburn	Androscoggin	Kennebec Valley	Local history	Includes the Davis-Wagg Museum (website)
Aroostook County Historical and Art Museum	Houlton	Aroostook	Maine Lake Country	Local history	Includes a historic kitchen, military artifacts, photographs by (Edward) E. B. White and other photographers taken between 1885 and 1920, and displays about the area WWII prison camp
Ashland Logging Museum	Ashland	Aroostook	Maine Lake Country	Industry	Includes logging equipment, vehicles, replica log cookroom and scaler's office, blacksmith shop
Bangor Museum and Center for History	Bangor	Penobscot	Maine Highlands	History	Local history, photographs, clothing, Civil War artifacts. Located in the Thomas A. Hill House and Civil War Museum, operated by the Bangor Historical Society. (website)
Bangor Police Museum	Bangor	Penobscot	Maine Highlands	Law enforcement	Open by appointment (website)
Bar Harbor Historical Society Museum	Bar Harbor	Hancock	Down East	Local history	Includes area memorabilia, maps, antique clothing and photos
Bar Harbor Whale Museum	Bar Harbor	Hancock	Down East	Natural history	Whales and seals common to the Gulf of Maine; seeking new location (website)
Barracks Museum	Eastport	Washington	Down East	History	History of Fort Sullivan, fishing industry, local history
Bates College Museum of Art	Lewiston	Androscoggin	Kennebec Valley	Art	Collection includes many Maine artists and Marsden Hartley
Baxter House Museum	Gorham	Cumberland	Southern Maine Coast	Historic house	
Belfast Museum	Belfast	Waldo	Mid Coast	History	Operated by the Belfast Historical Society. Local and maritime history, art. (website)
Benjamin C. Wilder House	Washburn	Aroostook	Maine Lake Country	Historic house	Operated by the Salmon Brook Historical Society. Property also houses Aroostook Agricultural Museum, a barn displaying 1850-1910 farm equipment and tools
Biddeford Mills Museum	Biddeford	York	Southern Maine Coast	Local history	Offering mill tours and outreach events, preserving the legacy and history of textile mills in the Biddeford/Saco region,
Blacksmith Shop Museum	Dover-Foxcroft	Piscataquis	Maine Highlands	Industry	Operated by the Dover-Foxcroft Historical Society
Blaine House	Augusta	Kennebec	Kennebec Valley	Historic house	Maine's Governor's Mansion
Blue Hill Historical Society	Blue Hill	Hancock	Down East	Historic house	Located at Holt House (website)
Bowdoin College Museum of Art	Brunswick	Cumberland	Mid Coast	Art	Collections include American, European and non-Western paintings, sculpture, works on paper and decorative arts
Boothbay Railway Village	Boothbay	Lincoln	Mid Coast	Railway	Authentic steam locomotive surrounded by historic Maine buildings preserved in a recreated village, and a collection of 60 antique autos. (website)
Boothbay Region Historical Society	Boothbay Harbor	Lincoln	Mid Coast	Local history	website
Brick Store Museum	Kennebunk	York	Southern Maine Coast	History	Local history, art and culture museum housed in five 19th-Century buildings focusing on the Kennebunks and southern Maine.
Brooklin Keeping Historical Society	Brooklin	Hancock	Down East	Local history	website
Brooksville Historical Society Museum	Brooksville	Hancock	Down East	Local history	website
Bryant Stove & Music Museum	Thorndike	Waldo	Mid Coast	Collectibles	Antique stoves, antique toy cars, player pianos, music boxes and doll circus with miniature animated units. (website)
Bucksport Historical Society Museum	Bucksport	Hancock	Down East	History	Local history
Burnham Tavern Museum	Machias	Washington	Down East	Historic house	Late 18th-century period tavern with ties to the American Revolutionary War
Burnt Coat Harbor Light	Swan's Island	Hancock	Down East	Maritime	Keeper's house open in summer, tower open for climbing several times a week
Burnt Island Light	Boothbay	Lincoln	Mid Coast	Maritime	Boat trip to island lighthouse with living history docent portraying 1950s keeper's life
Caribou Historical Center & Museum	Caribou	Aroostook	Maine Lake Country	Local history	
Castine Historical Society	Castine	Hancock	Down East	Local history	Located in the Abbot School. (website)
Castle Tucker	Wiscasset	Lincoln	Mid Coast	Historic house	Operated by Historic New England, late 19th-century period house
Center for Maine Contemporary Art	Rockport	Knox	Mid Coast	Art	Contemporary art
Center for Moosehead History & Moosehead Aviation Museum	Greenville	Piscataquis	Maine Highlands	Multiple	Includes region's aviators, vintage aircraft and memorabilia, Native American influence and artifacts, medical care, Greenville High School, life in the area during the 1800s, local history. (website)
Cherryfield-Narrag Historical Society Museum	Cherryfield	Washington	Down East	Local history	website
Children's Discovery Museum of Maine	Augusta	Kennebec	Kennebec Valley	Children's	website
Children's Museum of Maine	Portland	Cumberland	Southern Maine Coast	Children's	
Clewley Museum	Brewer	Penobscot	Maine Highlands	Local history	Operated by the Brewer Historical Society, open by appointment. (website)
Clifton Historical Society Complex	Clifton	Penobscot	Maine Highlands	Local history	Includes Clifton Town Hall Museum and the Harold Allan Schoolhouse
Coastal Children's Museum	Rockland	Knox	Mid Coast	Children's	website
Colburn House State Historic Site	Pittston	Kennebec	Kennebec Valley	Historic house	Managed by the Arnold Expedition Historical Society and owned by the Maine Bureau of Parks and Lands. 18th-century house with ties to the American Revolutionary War.
Colby College Museum of Art	Waterville	Kennebec	Kennebec Valley	Art	Part of Colby College, specializes in American and contemporary art
Cole Land Transportation Museum	Bangor	Penobscot	Maine Highlands	Transportation	Land transportation equipment including tractors, farm equipment, fire trucks, motorcycles, bicycles, snowplows and cabooses
Colonial Pemaquid State Historic Site	New Harbor	Lincoln	Mid Coast	Multiple	Museum with excavated artifacts from Fort William Henry, an early 20th-century reconstruction of a late 17th-century fort, and the excavated remains of 17th- and 18th-century village buildings
Conway Homestead & Cramer Museum	Rockport	Knox	Mid Coast	Open air	Operated by the Camden-Rockport Historical Society, includes the historic house, history museum, barn with carriages, sleighs and tools, a blacksmith shop and maple sugaring house
Corinna Historical Society Museum	Corrina	Penobscot	Maine Highlands	Local history	
Corinth Historical Society Museum	Corinth	Penobscot	Maine Highlands	Local history	2 floors of displays, guided tours, Corinth History and Genealogy archives. Admission free, under 13 must be accompanied by adult. (website )
Counting House Museum	South Berwick	York	Southern Maine Coast	Local history	Home of the Old Berwick Historical Society, former textile mill office, exhibits about rural life in coastal New England, from tidewater farms to maritime trade
Country Store Museum	Bass Harbor	Hancock	Down East	Local history	Operated by the Tremont Historical Society, 19th-century country store with displays of local historic artifacts and photographs. (website)
Cushing's Point Museum at Bug Light Park	South Portland	Cumberland	Southern Maine Coast	Local history	Operated by the South Portland Historical Society
Davistown Museum	Liberty	Waldo	Mid Coast	Multiple	website, hand tools used in Maine and New England's maritime culture, art, history, Native Americans, environment
Dead River Area Historical Society	Eustis	Franklin	Maine Lake Country	Local history	Located in Stratton, near Eustis (website)
Deer Isle-Stonington Historical Society Museum	Deer Isle	Hancock	Down East	Local history	website
Dennys River Historical Society	Dennysville	Washington	Down East	Historical society	Vestry Museum
Depot House Museum	Pittsfield	Somerset	Somerset	Local history	Operated by the Pittsfield Historical Society
Desert of Maine	Freeport	Cumberland	Mid Coast	Multiple	40-acre (160,000 m^{2}) tract of exposed glacial silt, includes a sand museum and agriculture museum
Dixfield Historical Society Museum	Dixfield	Oxford	Western Maine Mountains	Local history	website
Dr. Job Holmes Cottage & Museum	Calais	Washington	Down East	Historic house	Operated by the St Croix Historical Society, restored as an 1850 doctor’s home and office
Dry Mills Schoolhouse Museum	Gray	Cumberland	Southern Maine Coast	Education	Mid-19th-century period one-room schoolhouse
Eagle Island State Historic Site	Eagle Island	Cumberland	Southern Maine Coast	Historic house	Island with retirement home of Admiral Robert Peary, the polar explorer
Ellsworth Historical Society Museum	Ellsworth	Hancock	Down East	Historic house	Mid 19th-century Victorian sheriff's house, office and original cell block and jail
Fairfield History House	Fairfield	Somerset	Somerset	Local history	Located in the Cotton-Smith House, operated by the Fairfield Historical Society
Falmouth Heritage Museum	Falmouth	Cumberland	Southern Maine Coast	History	Operated by the Falmouth Historical Society (website)
Farnsworth Art Museum	Rockland	Knox	Mid Coast	Art	American art
Fawcett's Antique Toy & Art Museum	Waldoboro	Lincoln	Mid Coast	Toy	Collection of antique toys and original comic art (website)
Fifth Maine Regiment Museum	Peaks Island	Cumberland	Southern Maine Coast	Military	Civil War and local history exhibits
Fishermen’s Museum at Pemaquid	Bristol	Lincoln	Mid Coast	Maritime	Artifacts of Pemaquid Point Light and area maritime history
Fort Kent State Historic Site	Fort Kent	Aroostook	Maine Lake Country	Military	Reconstructed early 19th-century log blockhouse
Fort Kent Historical Society Museum	Fort Kent	Aroostook	Maine Lake Country	Railroad	Area railroad history
Fort Knox	Prospect	Waldo	Mid Coast	Military	Restored mid-19th-century fort and visitor center
Fort McClary State Historic Site	Kittery Point	York	Southern Maine Coast	Military	Mid-19th-century blockhouse with exhibits, open in summer
Frenchboro Historical Society	Frenchboro	Hancock	Down East	Local history	website
Friendship Museum	Friendship	Knox	Mid Coast	Local history	website
Frontier Heritage Historical Society	Fort Fairfield	Aroostook	Maine Lake Country	Multiple	Operates Fort Fairfield Railroad Museum, Blockhouse Museum, McIntosh One-Room School House, Friends Church
Fryeburg Fair Farm Museum	Fryeburg	Oxford	Western Maine Mountains	Agriculture	Open during the Fryeburg Fair, historic farm vehicles, equipment, crafts and trades. (website)
Fryeburg Historical Society Museum	Fryeburg	Oxford	Western Maine Mountains	Local history	website
General Henry Knox Museum	Thomaston	Knox	Mid Coast	Historic house	House known as Montpelier, life and times of Henry Knox (website)
Georgetown Historical Society Museum	Georgetown	Sagadahoc	Mid Coast	Local history	website
George B. Dorr Museum of Natural History	Bar Harbor	Hancock	Down East	Natural history	Part of College of the Atlantic (website)
Gibbs Avenue Museum	Bridgton	Cumberland	Southern Maine Coast	Local history	Operated by the Bridgton Historical Society in a former fire station (website)
Governor Brann School	Van Buren	Aroostook	Maine Lake Country	School	Historic one room school
Gray Historical Society Museum	Gray	Cumberland	Southern Maine Coast	Historical society	Museum is open on special Open House days and on request (website)
Great Harbor Maritime Museum	Northeast Harbor	Hancock	Down East	Maritime	Located in the old town firehouse
Green Water Tank Museum	Frenchville	Aroostook	Maine Lake Country	Railway	Operated by the Frenchville Historical Society
Grindle Point Sailor's Museum and Lighthouse	Islesboro	Waldo	Mid Coast	Maritime	Maritime museum in the keeper's house, lighthouse tower open for tours in the summer
Grist Mill Museum	Dexter	Penobscot	Maine Highlands	Local history	Operated by the Dexter Historical Society, former 19th-century mill, miller's house and schoolhouse with local history displays (website)
Guilford Historical Society Museum	Guilford	Piscataquis	Maine Highlands	Local history	website
Hamilton House	South Berwick	York	Southern Maine Coast	Historic house	Operated by Historic New England, late 19th-century period house and garden
Hamlin Memorial Library and Museum	Paris	Oxford	Western Maine Mountains	Local history	website
Hampden Historical Society	Hampden	Penobscot	Maine Highlands	Local history	Located in the 1794 Kinsley House
Harmon Museum	Old Orchard Beach	York	Southern Maine Coast	Local history	Home to Old Orchard Beach Historical Society (website)
Harpswell Historical Society Museum	Harpswell	Cumberland	Mid Coast	Local history	website
Harrigan Learning Center and Museum	Milo	Piscataquis	Maine Highlands	Fossils, minerals & Native American artifacts	website Owned by the Three Rivers Kiwanis of Milo/Brownville
Harriman School Museum	Sebec	Piscataquis	Maine Highlands	Local history	Home to the Sebec Historical Society
Harrington House	Freeport	Cumberland	Southern Maine Coast	Local history	Home to Freeport Historical Society (website)
Haystack Historical Society	Mapleton	Aroostook	Maine Lake Country	History	Displays of everyday historical artifacts including household and farming implements
Hendricks Hill Museum	Southport	Lincoln	Mid Coast	Local history	website
Holmes-Crafts Homestead	Jay	Franklin	Maine Lake Country	Historic house	Operated by the Jay Historic Society, by appointment only
Hope Historical Society House and Museum	Hope	Knox	Mid Coast	Historic house	website
Hose 5 Fire Museum	Bangor	Penobscot	Maine Highlands	Fire	Historic firefighting vehicles and equipment
Hudson Museum	Orono	Penobscot	Maine Highlands	Anthropology	Part of the University of Maine, cultural art and artifacts with emphasis on Native American and South American artifacts
International Cryptozoology Museum	Portland	Cumberland	Southern Maine Coast	Natural history	Exhibits related to the search for animals whose existence has not been proven (website)
Islesboro Historical Society Museum	Islesboro	Waldo	Down East	Local history	website
Islesford Historical Museum	Little Cranberry Island	Hancock	Down East	Local history	History of Little Cranberry Island, within the boundaries of Acadia National Park
James Leavitt House	Waterboro	York	Southern Maine Coast	Historic house	
Jonathan Fisher House	Blue Hill	Hancock	Down East	Historic house	Early 19th-century homestead, legacy of Reverend Jonathan Fisher
Joshua L. Chamberlain Museum	Brunswick	Cumberland	Mid Coast	Historic house	Maintained by the Pejepscot Historical Society, 19th-century Victorian home
Kennebunkport History Center	Kennebunkport	York	Southern Maine Coast	Open air	Operated by Kennebunkport Historical Society, includes Pasco Exhibit Center, town house school, Clark Shipyard office, old jail cells, Benson blacksmith shop (website)
Kenneth E. Stoddard Shell Museum	Boothbay	Lincoln	Mid Coast	Natural history	information
Kingfield Historical House	Kingfield	Franklin	Maine Lake Country	Historic house	Operated by the Kingfield Historical Society, displays of local history
Kittery Historical & Naval Museum	Kittery	York	Southern Maine Coast	Maritime	Area maritime, military and local history (website)
Lagerstrom House	Woodland	Aroostook	Maine Lake Country	Historic house	Late 19th-century house, operated by the Woodland Historical Society
L. C. Bates Museum	Hinckley	Somerset	Somerset	Natural history	Natural history, archaeology, art and Americana, between Fairfield and Skowhegan
Limington Historical Society	Limington	York	Southern Maine Coast	Local history	Barn museum open seasonally (website)
Lincolnville Historical Society School House Museum	Lincolnville	Waldo	Mid Coast	Local history	website
Lindbergh Crate Museum	Canaan	Somerset	Somerset	Collectible	Open by appointment, collection of Lindberghabilia displayed inside the packing crate in which Lindbergh's plane, the Spirit of St. Louis, was shipped back to America after Lindbergh completed the first human, solo transatlantic flight in 1927
Loring Military Heritage Center	Limestone	Aroostook	Maine Lake Country	Military	History of the former Loring Air Force Base
Lubec Historical Society Museum	Lubec	Washington	Down East	History	Early 20th-century general store
Lovell Historical Society Museum	Lovell	Oxford	Western Maine Mountains	Local history	Also known as the Kimball-Stanford House
Madrid Schoolhouse Museum	Madrid	Franklin	Maine Lake Country	Local history	Located in a historic schoolhouse with school and local history displays, open on a limited basis, operated by the Madrid Historical Society
Maine Air Museum	Bangor	Penobscot	Maine Highlands	Aviation	Located at Bangor International Airport
Maine Art Glass Butterfly and Insect Museum	Lisbon Falls	Androscoggin	Kennebec Valley	Natural history	Mounted butterflies and insects in diorama cases, located in a stained glass workshop and gallery
Maine Coast Sardine History Museum	Jonesport	Washington	Down East	Industry	Area sardine canning industry, tools, machines (website)
Maine Discovery Museum	Bangor	Penobscot	Maine Highlands	Children's	
Maine Forest & Logging Museum	Bradley	Penobscot	Maine Highlands	Industry	History of forestry in the state, authentic reconstruction of a logging and milling community of the 1790s
Maine Forestry Museum	Rangeley	Franklin	Maine Lake Country	Industry	Includes 72-acre trail system, vintage logging equipment, chainsaw carvings, oil paintings that depict life in the logging camps from 1915 to 1928, logging dioramas, photographs (website)
Maine Granite Industry Museum	Mount Desert	Hancock	Down East	Industry	Operated by the Maine Granite Industry Historical Society, tools, photos, company ledgers, books, Union badges and constitutions (website)
Maine Historical Society Museum	Portland	Cumberland	Southern Maine Coast	History	Changing exhibits about Maine's history, art and culture
Maine Lighthouse Museum	Rockland	Knox	Mid Coast	Lighthouse	Collection of lighthouse lenses, lighthouse artifacts and Coast Guard memorabilia (website)
Maine Maritime Museum	Bath	Sagadahoc	Mid Coast	Maritime	Includes a historic shipyard with five original 19th-century buildings and a Victorian-era shipyard owner's home
Maine Military Historical Society	Augusta	Kennebec	Kennebec Valley	Military	State's military history (website)
Maine Military Museum and Learning Center	South Portland	Cumberland	Southern Maine Coast	Military	website, every aspect of military service from the Revolutionary War to Afghanistan and Iraq
Maine Mineral and Gem Museum	Bethel	Oxford County	Western Maine Mountains	Geology	website, state rocks, mineral, and gems, as well as meteors and fossils.
Maine Narrow Gauge Railroad Museum	Portland	Cumberland	Southern Maine Coast	Railroad	Rolling stock and artifacts from the 2 ft (610 mm) gauge narrow gauge railroads
Maine Ski and Snowboard Museum	Carrabassett Valley	Franklin	Maine Lake Country	Sports	Ski and Snowboard equipment, artifacts and memorabilia
Maine State Aquarium	Boothbay Harbor	Lincoln	Mid Coast	Aquarium	website, depicts local marine life in 13 tank exhibits and 2 live touch tanks
Maine State Building	Poland	Androscoggin	Kennebec Valley	Art	Operated by the Poland Spring Preservation Society, changing art exhibits in a building that was originally at the 1893 World's Columbian Exposition in Chicago
Maine State Museum	Augusta	Kennebec	Kennebec Valley	Multiple	State history and culture, Native American culture, natural history, industry
Maine's Paper and Heritage Museum	Livermore Falls	Androscoggin	Kennebec Valley	Industry	website, cultural heritage of the paper-making towns and mills along the Androscoggin River
Margaret Chase Smith Library	Skowhegan	Somerset	Somerset	Biographical	website, includes museum with artifacts from life of Senator Margaret Chase Smith
Marrett House	Standish	Cumberland	Southern Maine Coast	Historic house	Operated by Historic New England, 19th-century period house
Matthews Museum of Maine Heritage	Union	Knox	Mid Coast	Agriculture	website, open in summer, lifestyles in the 18th century, including carriages, agricultural tools, musical instruments, books, collections of photo prints
McCurdy Smokehouse	Lubec	Washington	Down East	Industry	Former traditional smoked-herring facility with exhibits about the area fishing industry, also includes an art gallery, operated by Lubec Landmarks
McLellan-Sweat Mansion	Portland	Cumberland	Southern Maine Coast	Historic house	Part of the Portland Museum of Art, 19th-century house featuring 19th-century American paintings and decorative arts
Meetinghouse Museum	Wells	York	Southern Maine Coast	History	website, home of Historical Society of Wells & Ogunquit
Mexico Historical Society Museum	Mexico	Oxford	Western Maine Mountains	Local history	website
Milbridge Historical Museum	Milbridge	Washington	Down East	Local history	website, operated by the Millbridge Historical Society
Millinocket Historical Society	Millinocket	Penobscot	Maine Highlands	Local history	website, developing the Millinocket Town Museum
Milo Historical Society Museum	Milo	Piscataquis	Maine Highlands	Local history	Located in a historic church, permanent exhibits of local history, industry and cultural life
Monhegan Museum	Monhegan	Lincoln	Mid Coast	Multiple	Natural, social, industrial, cultural, and artistic history of Monhegan, located in a lighthouse complex
Monmouth Museum	Monmouth	Kennebec	Kennebec Valley	Open air	website, 19th-century rural life, complex includes a blacksmith shop, the Blossom House, stencil shop, carriage house, freight shed, corn crib, cobbler's shop and country store
Moosehead Historical Museum	Greenville	Piscataquis	Maine Highlands	Historic house	website, housed in the Victorian-period Eveleth-Crafts-Sheridan House, carriage house features the Lumberman's Museum with logging tools and equipment
Moosehead Marine Museum	Greenville	Piscataquis	Maine Highlands	Maritime	Features cruises on the steamboat Katahdin
Morrell-Sherburne House	North Berwick	York	Southern Maine Coast	Historic house	website, home of the North Berwick Historical Society
Mount Desert Oceanarium	Bar Harbor	Hancock	Down East	Industry	website, includes Maine Lobster Museum and lobster hatchery
Mount Desert Oceanarium	Southwest Harbor	Hancock	Down East	Industry	website, includes marine aquarium and Fisherman's Museum
Musée Culturel du Mont-Carmel	Lille	Aroostook	Maine Lake Country	History	Historic wooden Catholic church, collection of Acadian, Catholic and Québecois artifacts
Museum L-A	Lewiston	Androscoggin	Kennebec Valley	Industry	Textile and area industry and labor heritage
Museum of African Culture	Portland	Cumberland	Southern Maine Coast	Culture	Sub-Saharan African tribal art
Museum of Chebeague History at the District 9 Schoolhouse	Chebeague Island	Cumberland	Southern Maine Coast	Local history	Operated by the Chebeague Island Historical Society
Museums of Old York	York	York	Southern Maine Coast	Open air	website, nine historic museum buildings including the Old York Gaol, John Hancock Warehouse, Old Schoolhouse (York, Maine), Elizabeth Perkins House, Jefferds Tavern, the Steedman Woods nature preserve, a contemporary art gallery and restored gardens
Museums of the Bethel Historical Society	Bethel	Oxford	Western Maine Mountains	History	Eight exhibit galleries and nine period rooms spread throughout two buildings - the 1821 O'Neil Robinson House and the 1813 Dr. Moses Mason House
Naples Historical Society Museum	Naples	Cumberland	Southern Maine Coast	Local history	website
Narramissic	Bridgton	Cumberland	Southern Maine Coast	Historic house	website, operated by the Bridgton Historical Society, also known as the Peabody-Fitch Farm
Nathan Gates House	Machiasport	Washington	Down East	Historic house	Home of Machiasport Historical Society, photographs, period furniture, housewares and other memorabilia
National Museum of the Morgan Horse	New Gloucester	Cumberland		Natural history	Operated by the American Morgan Horse Association, history of the Morgan horse
Neal Dow Memorial	Portland	Cumberland	Southern Maine Coast	Historic house	19th-century headquarters of the Maine Woman's Christian Temperance Union
New Sweden Historical Society Museum	New Sweden	Aroostook	Maine Lake Country	History	
Nickels-Sortwell House	Wiscasset	Lincoln	Mid Coast	Historic house	Operated by Historic New England, 19th-century house with Colonial Revival furnishings
Nobleboro Historical Center	Nobleboro	Lincoln	Mid Coast	Local history	website, operated by the Nobleboro Historical Society
Nordica Homestead	Farmington	Franklin	Maine Lake Country	Historic house	Birthplace of diva Lillian Nordica
Norridgewock Historical Society Museum	Norridgewock	Somerset	Somerset	Local history	
Northeast Historic Film	Bucksport	Hancock	Down East	Media	Exhibits in the Alamo Theatre including the cinema's history, social history of moviegoing, amateur filmmaking equipment
Northern Maine Museum of Science	Presque Isle	Aroostook	Maine Lake Country	Natural history	Part of the University of Maine at Presque Isle, exhibits include biology, mathematics, physical science, astronomy, chemistry, geology, forestry, agriculture
Northern Timber Cruisers Antique Snowmobile Museum	Millinocket	Penobscot	Maine Highlands	Transportation	website, snowmobiles from the 1960s and a 1943 Toboggan
Nowetah's American Indian Museum and Gift Store	New Portland	Somerset	Somerset	Native American	website, includes over 600 old Maine Indian baskets and bark containers
Nylander Museum	Caribou	Aroostook	Maine Lake Country	Natural history	website, fossils, rocks, plants, insects, butterflies, mammals, birds
Oakfield Railroad Museum	Oakfield	Aroostook	Maine Lake Country	Railway	Bangor and Aroostook Railroad artifacts and history
Observer Building Museum	Dover-Foxcroft	Piscataquis	Maine Highlands	Local history	Operated by the Dover-Foxcroft Historical Society
Ogunquit Museum of American Art	Ogunquit	York	Southern Maine Coast	Art	American art, open only in summer
Ogunquit Heritage Museum	Ogunquit	York	Southern Maine Coast	Local history	Located at the Captain James Winn House
Old Fort Western	Augusta	Kennebec	Kennebec Valley	History	18th-century log fort with house and store, costumed interpreters
Old Post Office	Liberty	Waldo	Mid Coast	Local history	Operated by the Liberty Historical Society on Saturdays in the summer
Old Town Museum	Old Town	Penobscot	Maine Highlands	Local history	website
Olson House	Cushing	Knox	Mid Coast	Historic house	Subject of numerous works of art by Andrew Wyeth, including Christina's World, operated by the Farnsworth Art Museum
Orland Historical Society Museum	Orland	Hancock	Down East	Local history	website
Owls Head Transportation Museum	Owls Head	Knox	Mid Coast	Transportation	website, includes airplanes, automobiles, bicycles, carriages, engines and motorcycles
Page Farm & Home Museum	Orono	Penobscot	Maine Highlands	Historic house	Owned by University of Maine, industry, agriculture, economy and home life of the late nineteenth and early twentieth centuries
Patten Lumbermen's Museum	Patten	Penobscot	Maine Highlands	Industry	website, Maine logging history
Peary–MacMillan Arctic Museum	Brunswick	Cumberland	Mid Coast	Anthropological	Part of Bowdoin College, Inuit art and artifacts from the Arctic explorations of Robert Peary and Donald Baxter MacMillan
Pejepscot Museum	Brunswick	Cumberland	Mid Coast	Local history	Operated by the Pejepscot Historical Society, history of Brunswick, Topsham and Harpswell
Pelletier-Marquis House	St. Agatha	Aroostook	Maine Lake Country	Historic house	Operated by the St. Agathe Historical Society
Penobscot Marine Museum	Searsport	Waldo	Mid Coast	Maritime	19th-century village buildings with displays of boats, fishing artifacts, 19th-century Victorian period house, ship models, scrimshaw, marine art
Penobscot Nation Museum	Old Town	Penobscot	Maine Highlands	Native American	website, located on Indian Island, cultural heritage of the Penobscot and Wabanaki people, contemporary Wabanaki art
Pettengill Farm	Freeport	Cumberland	Southern Maine Coast	Historic house	website, owned by the Freeport Historical Society, early 1800s saltbox farmhouse is open by appointment, trails and grounds open daily
Phillips Historical Society Museum	Phillips	Franklin	Maine Lake Country	Railway	Located in the Capt. Joel Whitney House, includes collection of Portland Glass, period home furnishings, genealogical information and newspaper runs
Poland Spring Museum and Environmental Education Center	Poland	Androscoggin	Kennebec Valley	Industry	Company history and bottling operations
Portland Fire Museum	Portland	Cumberland	Southern Maine Coast	Fire	Operated by the Portland Veteran Firemen's Association, historic firefighting vehicles and equipment
Portland Head Light	Cape Elizabeth	Cumberland	Southern Maine Coast	Lighthouse	Museum with lighthouse lenses and interpretative displays, adjacent to Fort Williams Park
Portland Museum of Art	Portland	Cumberland	Southern Maine Coast	Art	American and European fine and decorative arts, and the L. D. M. Sweat Memorial Galleries
Preble-Marr Historical Museum	Great Cranberry Island	Hancock	Down East	Local history	website, operated by the Great Cranberry Island Historical Society in the Cranberry House
Presque Isle Air Museum	Presque Isle	Aroostook	Maine Lake Country	Aviation	History of Presque Isle Air Force Base, located at Northern Maine Regional Airport at Presque Isle
Presque Isle Historical Society	Presque Isle	Aroostook	Maine Lake Country	Historical society	website, operates two museums: Maysville Museum (in a restored historically significant building that served simultaneously as the Maysville Town Hall, Maysville Grange and Maysville School) at 165 Caribou Road (US Rte 1) and is open during the summer Monday - Saturday from 10 - 2 with no admission; and The 1875 Vera Estey House Museum at 16 Third Street, a small two-story Victorian house. Admission is $5 per person; open during regularly scheduled tour - see website - or by appointment for groups.
Project Puffin Visitor Center	Rockland	Knox	Mid Coast	Natural history	Features a live video display of puffins and other seabirds from Seal Island National Wildlife Refuge, natural history displays, the seabird conservation work done by the National Audubon Society and others
Public Safety Museum	Brewer	Penobscot	Maine Highlands	Multiple	website, operated by the city, historic displays from the Brewer Fire and Police Departments
Quoddy Dam Model Museum	Eastport	Washington	Down East	Technology	website, operated by the Border Historical Society, working scale model of the Passamaquoddy Bay Tidal Power Project; also known as Quoddy Maritime Museum
Rangeley Outdoor Sporting Heritage Museum	Rangeley	Franklin	Maine Lake Country	Sports	website, outdoor sports including fly fishing, boating, Paleo Native American artifacts, antique sporting equipment, a working silk fly line making machine, art
Raye's Mustard Mill Museum	Eastport	Washington	Down East	Industry	website, working mustard mill museum and mustard shop
Raymond-Casco Historical Society Museum	Casco	Cumberland	Southern Maine Coast	Local history	website
Readfield Historical Society Museum	Readfield	Kennebec	Kennebec Valley	Local history	website
Redington Museum	Waterville	Kennebec	Kennebec Valley	Historic house	Operated by the Waterville Historical Society, 19th-century house with collections of furniture, accessories, household artifacts, toys, tools, and weapons
Robert S. Peacock Fire Museum	Lubec	Washington	Down East	Firefighting	
Rockwell Kent Cottage and Studio	Monhegan	Lincoln	Mid Coast	Historic house	Home and studio of artist Rockwell Kent
Rufus Porter Museum	Bridgton	Cumberland	Southern Maine Coast	Art	Home of folk artist Rufus Porter
Ruggles House	Columbia Falls	Washington	Down East	Historic house	19th-century period house with many original family furnishings
Rumford Historical Society Museum	Rumford	Oxford	Western Maine Mountains	Local history	website, also known as the Lufkin School Museum
Sabbathday Lake Shaker Village	New Gloucester	Cumberland	Southern Maine Coast	Religious	Includes Shaker Museum
Saco Museum	Saco	York	Southern Maine Coast	Multiple	Regional museum of fine and decorative arts and historic artifacts, also known as Dyer Library/Saco Museum, formerly known as the York Institute
Sail Power and Steam Museum	Rockland	Knox	Mid Coast	Maritime	website
Sandy River & Rangeley Lakes Railroad	Phillips	Franklin	Maine Lake Country	Railway	Heritage railroad and equipment
Sarah Orne Jewett House	South Berwick	York	Southern Maine Coast	Historic house	Operated by Historic New England, features a blend of 18th-century architecture, antiques, and old wallpapers with furnishings showing the influence of the Arts and Crafts movement
Sayward-Wheeler House	York Harbor	York	Southern Maine Coast	Historic house	Operated by Historic New England, 18th-century period house
Scarborough Historical Society Museum	Scarborough	Cumberland	Southern Maine Coast	Local history	Located in a former power substation of the Portland Railroad Company
Seal Cove Auto Museum	Seal Cove	Hancock	Down East	Automotive	website, antique cars and motorcycles with a special emphasis on the Brass Era car (1895-1917)
Seashore Trolley Museum	Kennebunkport	York	Southern Maine Coast	Railway	Mass transit vehicles including trolley cars, rapid transit trains, trolley buses and motor buses
Sebago Historical Society Museum	Sebago	Cumberland	Southern Maine Coast	Local history	
Sedgwick-Brooklin Historical Society Museum	Sedgwick	Hancock	Down East	History	website, located in the Rev. Daniel Merrill House (1795)
Skolfield-Whittier House	Brunswick	Cumberland	Mid Coast	Historic house	Maintained by the Pejepscot Historical Society, 19th-century Victorian home
Skowhegan History House	Skowhegan	Somerset	Somerset	Local history	website
Skyline Farm	North Yarmouth	Cumberland	Southern Maine Coast	Transportation	website, living carriage museum with an antique carriage & sleigh collection, open for events and by appointment
Snowman School House	Woodland	Aroostook	Maine Lake Country	Local history	One room schoolhouse with local history artifacts
Somesville Historical Museum	Mount Desert Island	Hancock	Down East	Local history	website, operated by Mount Desert Island Historical Society
Sound School House Museum	Mount Desert Island	Hancock	Down East	History	website, operated by Mount Desert Island Historical Society
South Bristol Historical Society Museum	South Bristol	Lincoln	Mid Coast	Local history	website
Southern Aroostook Agricultural Museum	Littleton	Aroostook	Maine Lake Country	Agriculture	website, farm tools and equipment, household items, memorabilia from the past two centuries
Stanley Museum	Kingfield	Franklin	Maine Lake Country	History	website, Stanley Steamer cars, air-brush portraits, paintings, photographs
Stanwood Homestead	Ellsworth	Hancock	Down East	Historic house	19th-century home of ornithologist Cordelia Stanwood and the Richmond Nature Center, 200-acre wildlife sanctuary
Stockholm Historical Society Museum	Stockholm	Aroostook	Maine Lake Country	Local history	Located in a historic general store building, open by appointment
Tante Blanche Museum	Madawaska	Aroostook	Maine Lake Country	Local history	website, operated by the Madawaska Historical Society
Tate House Museum	Portland	Cumberland	Southern Maine Coast	Historic house	Mid 18th-century period house
The Telephone Museum	Ellsworth	Hancock	Down East	Industry	website, working telephones, switchboards and switching systems, operated by The New England Museum of Telephony, Inc.
Thomaston Historical Society Museum	Thomaston	Knox	Mid Coast	Local history	website, houses a library and museum
Tides Institute and Museum of Art	Eastport	Washington	Down East	Art	website, art, architecture and history, collections include paintings, prints, photographs, sculpture, Passamaquoddy and Micmac basketry, architectural documentation and artifacts, ship models, maps, furniture, musical instruments
Turner Museum	Turner	Androscoggin	Kennebec Valley	Local history	Operated by the Turner Museum and Historical Association, located on the fourth floor of the Leavitt Institute Building
Umbrella Cover Museum	Peaks Island	Cumberland	Southern Maine Coast	Collectible	Features over 600 umbrella covers
Union Historical Society	Union	Knox	Mid Coast	Historic house	website, headquartered in the Robins House
University of Maine Museum of Art	Bangor	Penobscot	Maine Highlands	Art	Focuses on American mid-20th-century works on paper
University of Southern Maine Art Gallery	Portland	Cumberland	Southern Maine Coast	Art	
University of Southern Maine Art Gallery	Gorham	Cumberland	Southern Maine Coast	Art	
University of Southern Maine Atrium Art Gallery	Lewiston	Androscoggin	Kennebec Valley	Art	website, exhibits highlight Maine artists with solo and group exhibitions of painting, drawing, photography, sculpture and contemporary crafts
Victoria Mansion	Portland	Cumberland	Southern Maine Coast	Historic house	Also known as Morse-Libby House, late 19th-century Victorian mansion
Vinalhaven Historical Society Museum	Vinalhaven	Knox	Mid Coast	History	website
Wadsworth-Longfellow House	Portland	Cumberland	Southern Maine Coast	Historic house	Operated by the Maine Historical Society, home of poet Henry Wadsworth Longfellow
Waldoborough Historical Society Museum	Waldoboro	Lincoln	Mid Coast	Local history	website
Waponahki Tribal Museum	Passamaquoddy Pleasant Point Reservation	Washington	Down East	Native American	website, Maine Native tools, baskets, beaded artifacts, historic photos, and arts and crafts
Washburn-Norlands Living History Center	Livermore	Androscoggin	Kennebec Valley	Living	Mid 19th-century period mansion, farm and schoolhouse
Wendell Gilley Museum	Southwest Harbor	Hancock	Down East	Art	Wooden bird carvings by Wendell Gilley and other artists
West Quoddy Head Light House Visitor Center	Lubec	Washington	Down East	Maritime	History of the lighthouse
White Columns	Kennebunkport	York	Southern Maine Coast	Historic house	website, operated by Kennebunkport Historical Society, 1853 Greek Revival house museum with restored period rooms, features First Families Kennebunkport Museum, also known as Nott House
Wilhelm Reich Museum	Rangeley	Franklin	Maine Lake Country	Biographical	Also known as Orgonon, home of scientist Wilhelm Reich
Willowbrook Museum Village	Newfield	York	Southern Maine Coast	Open air	Restored country village with two historic houses and their barns, a reproduction schoolhouse and bandstand, trade shops and carriages
Wilson Museum	Castine	Hancock	Down East	Multiple	Exhibits include history, natural history, cultural, and historic houses John Perkins House, Blacksmith Shop and Hearse House
Wilton Farm & Home Museum	Wilton	Franklin	Maine Lake Country	History	Operated by the Wilton Historical Society, displays include farm tools, Maine bottles, homemaking, military uniforms, clothing, bedrooms
Winslow Homer Studio	Scarborough	Cumberland	Southern Maine Coast	Historic house	House and studio of artist Winslow Homer, tours by the Portland Museum of Art
Wiscasset, Waterville, and Farmington Railway Museum	Alna	Lincoln	Mid Coast	Railway	2 ft (0.61 m) (610 mm) gauge heritage railway and museum
Woodlawn Museum	Ellsworth	Hancock	Down East	Historic house	Collections reflect three generations of the Black family from 1802 to 1928
Woolwich History Museum	Woolwich	Sagadahoc	Mid Coast	History	19th-century rural life museum operated by the Woolwich Historical Society (website)
Yarmouth History Center	Yarmouth	Cumberland	Southern Maine Coast	Local history	website, operated by the Yarmouth Historical Society

== Defunct Museums ==
- Downeast Heritage Museum, Calais, closed in 2008
- Johnson Hall Museum, Wells, contents auctioned off in 2015, future uncertain
- Jones Museum of Glass and Ceramic, Sebago,
- Mainely Critters Wildlife Museum, Dixfield, destroyed in 2000 due to fire
- Museum of Lighthouse History, Wells, lighthouse collection relocated to the Maine Lighthouse Museum,
- Musical Wonder House, Wiscasset, closed in 2014
- Portland Harbor Museum, Portland, merged with the Maine Maritime Museum in June 2010
- Rier Sardine Museum, Lubec
- Shore Village Museum, Rockland, lighthouse collection relocated to the Maine Lighthouse Museum,
- Webb Museum of Vintage Fashion, Island Falls
- Wells Auto Museum, Wells, closed in 2013

== See also ==
- Botanical gardens in Maine (category)
- List of historical societies in Maine
- Nature Centers in Maine
