= White Memorial Building =

White Memorial Building may refer to:

- White Memorial Building (Houlton, Maine), listed on the NRHP in Maine
- White Memorial Building (Syracuse, New York), listed on the NRHP
