= List of historical societies in Maine =

The following is a list of historical societies in the state of Maine, United States.

== Organizations ==
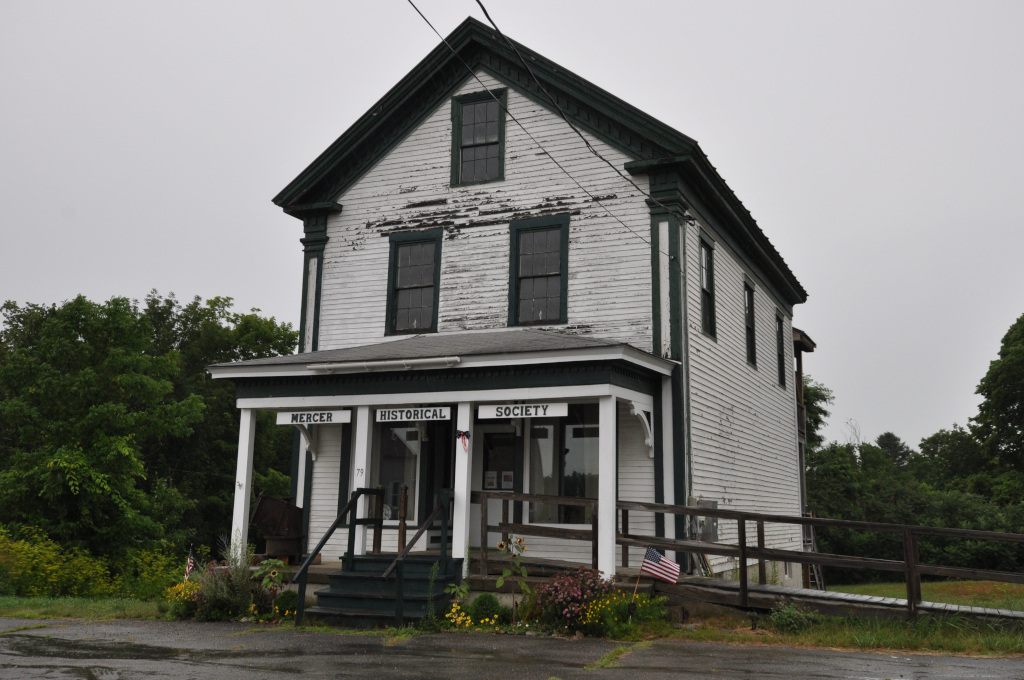
Mercer Historical Society building in Maine (photo 2022)

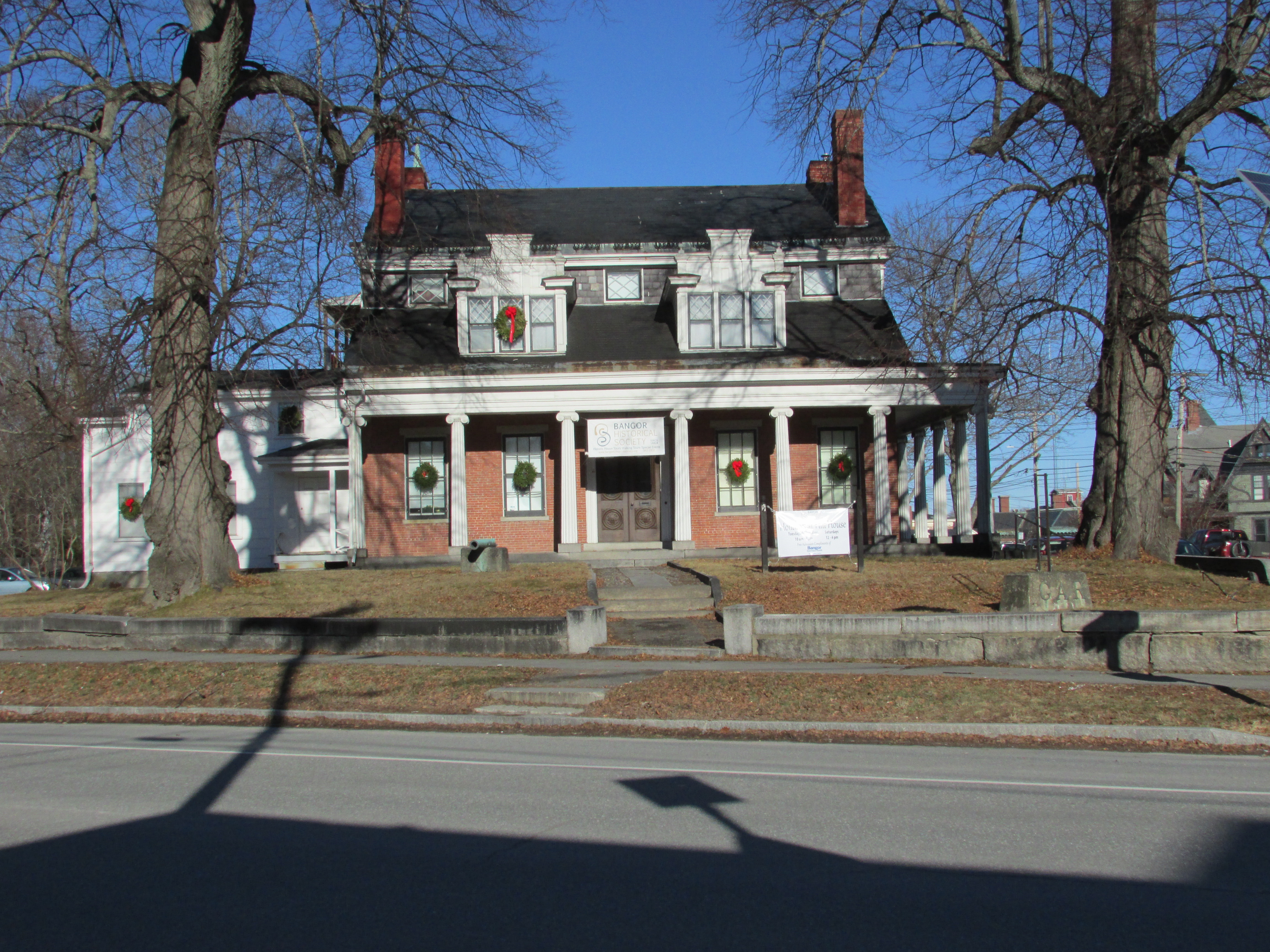
Bangor Historical Society building in Maine (photo 2018)

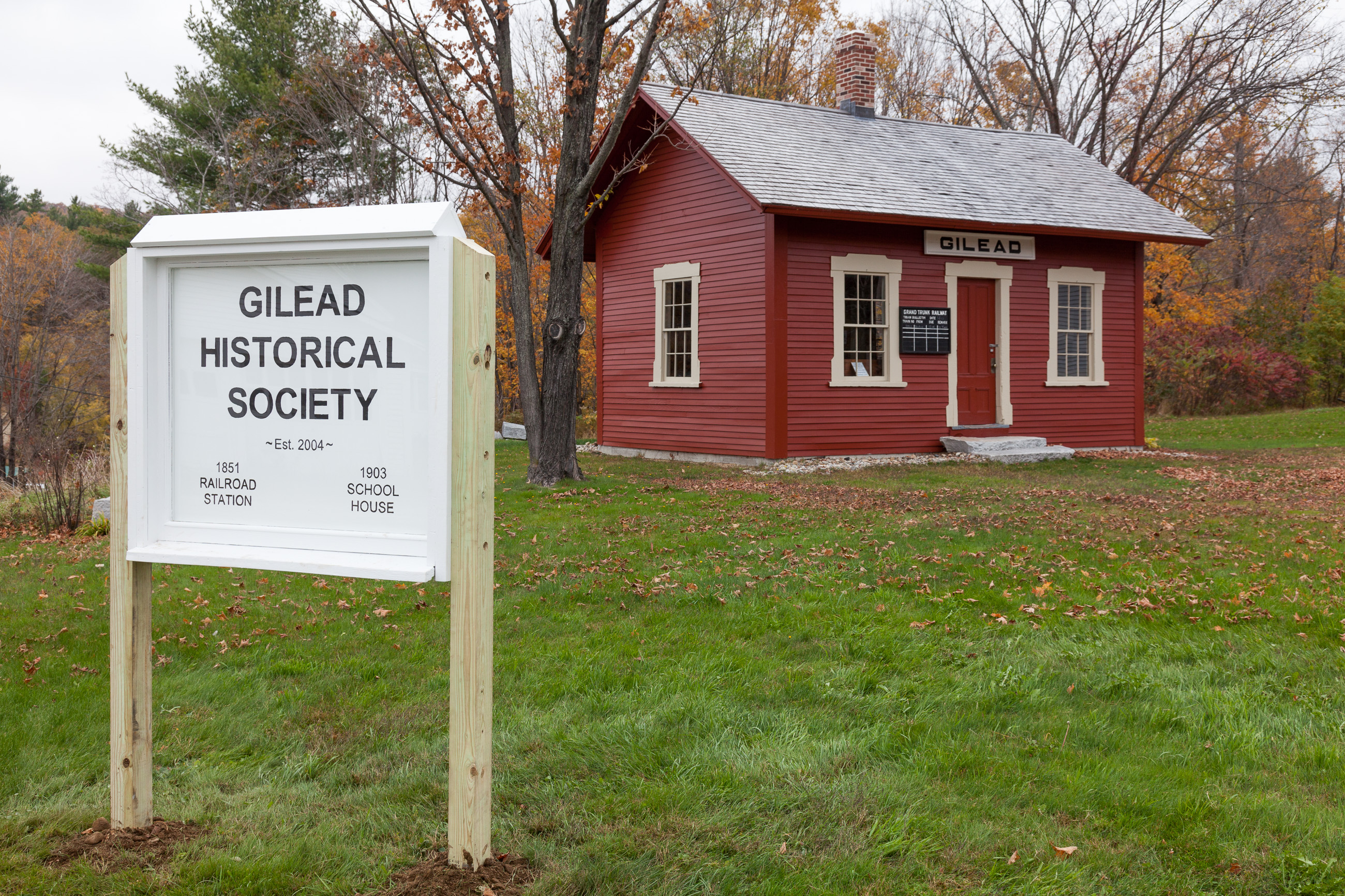
Gilead Historical Society sign and building in Maine (photo 2013)

- Bangor Historical Society
- Bar Harbor Historical Society
- Belfast Historical Society
- Bethel Historical Society
- Bradford Heritage: Museum and Historical Society
- Bustins Island Historical Society
- Camden Historical Society
- China Historical Society
- Clinton Historical Society (Maine)
- East Madison Historical Association
- Freeport Historical Society
- Gilead Historical Society
- Grand Lake Stream Historical Society
- Islands Association of Museums and Historical Societies
- Isle Au Haut Historical Society
- Kittery Historical Society
- Knox Memorial Association
- Leeds Historical Commission
- Lincolnville Historical Society
- Lyman Historical Society
- Maine Historical Society
- Maine Military Historical Society Inc
- Mercer Historical Society
- Minot Historical Society
- New England Electric Railway Historical Society
- North Yarmouth Historical Society
- Oakfield Historical Society
- Old Canada Road Historical Society
- Old Carratunk Historical Society
- Old Town Penobscot National Historical Society
- Paris Cape Historical Society
- Parkman Historical Society
- Peaks Island Historical Society
- Pejepscot Historical Society, Brunswick, Topsham & Harpswell history
- Perham Historical Society
- Pittsfield Historical Society
- Presque Isle Historical & Genealogical Society
- Prouts Neck Historical Society
- Rangeley Lakes Region Historical Society
- Salem Historical Community Association
- Scarborough Historical Society (Maine)
- Sanford Historical Committee
- South Portland Historical Society
- Southern Aroostook Historical Society
- Southport Historical Society
- Spruce Head Community Hall and Historical Association
- Starks Historical Society
- Ste Agathe Historical Society
- Sullivan-Sorrento Historical Society
- Swans Island Historical Society
- Vanceboro Historical Society
- Verona Island Historical Society
- West Branch Historical Preservation Committee
- Westbrook - Wilton Historical Society
- Winslow Historical Society

== See also ==
- History of Maine
- List of museums in Maine
- National Register of Historic Places listings in Maine
- List of historical societies in the United States
