= George J. Varney =

American author

- Born: 1836
- Died: 1901 (aged 64–65)
- Occupations: Author, historian

George Jones Varney (1836–1901) was an American author and historian. He wrote several books, mainly on the history of New England states, including gazetteers of Massachusetts and Maine.

== Life and career ==
Varney was born in Maine in 1836. In the 1870s, he was living in Brunswick, Maine, while a decade later he was writing in Boston.

He was a member of the Maine Historical Society.

== Selected bibliography ==
Varney was the author of the following books:

- The Young People's History of Maine (1873)
- A Gazetteer of the State of Maine (1881)
- Acadia in the Revolution (1882)
- History of Thomaston, Maine (1886)
- A Brief History of Maine (1888)
- Gazetteer of Massachusetts (1890)
- The Story of Patriot's Day, Lexington and Concord, April 19, 1775 (1895)
- The Story of Jonah (1897)

His 1881 work, Gazetteer of the State of Maine, was published by B. B. Russell in Cornhill, Boston.

A Brief History of Maine included the earlier Young People's History of Maine and six additional chapters, bridging the gap from 1842 to 1888.

== Death ==
Varney died in 1901, aged 64 or 65.
