= Rufus Cutler Libby =

American photographer

- Born: October 3, 1861; Portland, Maine, U.S.
- Died: January 29, 1934 (aged 72); Portland, Maine, U.S.
- Resting place: Evergreen Cemetery, Portland, Maine, U.S.
- Known for: Photography

Rufus Cutler Libby (known professionally as R. Cutler Libby; October 3, 1861 – January 29, 1934) was an American photographer active in the late 19th and early 20th centuries. His large collection of works, many of which are of now-demolished buildings, is now in the archives of Maine Historical Society.

== Early life ==
Libby was born in Portland, Maine, in 1861 to Deacon Arthur Libby, a furniture dealer, and Elizabeth Ann Dresser.

== Career ==
He began working as an insurance agent, initially with North British & Mercantile at 28 Exchange Street, a career in which he remained for over fifty years. He was later based out of an office at 38 Exchange Street. In 1907, he was working for Pennsylvania Fire. In 1913, he joined Turner, Barker & Company at 48 Exchange Street. He became known as an amateur photographer; his collection numbered in the hundreds, and is now in possession of Maine Historical Society.

== Personal life ==
On December 30, 1885, he married Amelia Frances Brewer. Around a decade later, the couple were the first owners of 34 Congress Street, at the corner of Morning Street. Their son, Herman, inherited the home in 1934.

== Death ==
Libby died in 1934, aged 72, after a brief illness. He was interred in Portland's Evergreen Cemetery, alongside his wife who predeceased him by eleven months.
