= Bar Harbor Historical Society =

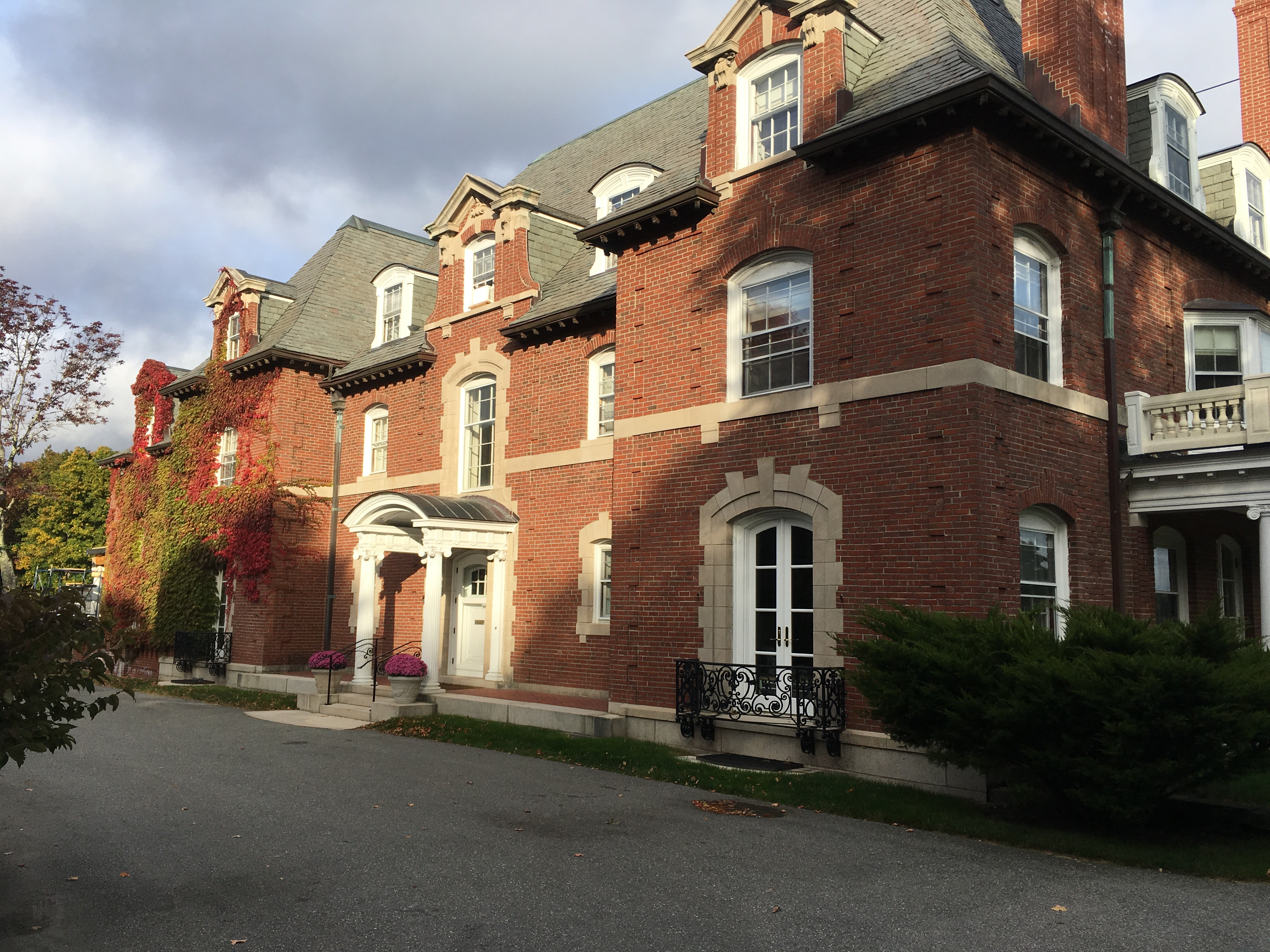
La Rochelle, at 127 West Street in Bar Harbor, to which the society moved in 2019

The Bar Harbor Historical Society is the principal historical society of Bar Harbor, Maine and Mount Desert Island. The society's museum is located in the La Rochelle mansion at 127 West Street in Bar Harbor, having moved from 33 Ledgelawn Avenue in early 2019.

== History ==
The Bar Harbor Historical Society was founded on August 19, 1946. The first physical location of the Historical Society was at this time established; making use of a small room under the stairs of the Jesup Library.

In 1997, the Bar Harbor Historical Society purchased its own building, acquiring 33 Ledgelawn Avenue, the former St. Edward’s Convent. This allowed the Historical Society to house its growing collection, and additionally, display the collection by opening a seasonal museum space on the building's first floor.

In 2019, the Bar Harbor Historical Society purchased La Rochelle, 41-room, 13,000 square foot brick estate built in 1902 on Bar Harbor's historical West Street. In that same year, the Historical Society successfully moved its archives and collections to their new building.

In 2026, the Society's board made all five members of its payrolled staff redundant, despite previously stating that would not happen.

== La Rochelle ==
The 41-room, 13,000 square foot mansion was built in 1902 for George Bowdoin (1833–1913), by architects Andrews and Rantoul of Boston. Occupants of the mansion before the historical society include Ruth and Tristram Colket and the Maine Seacoast Mission.

== Gallery ==
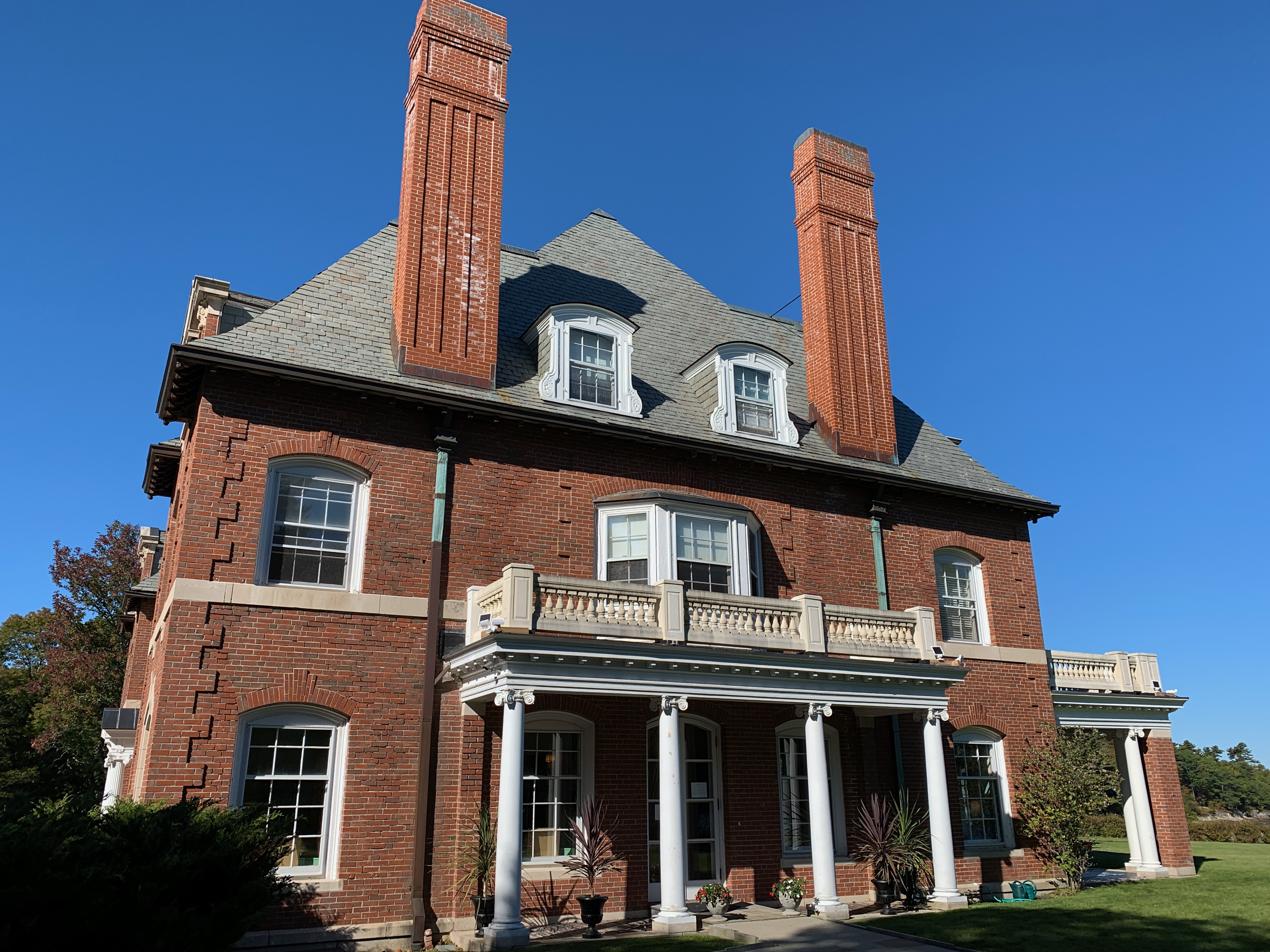
The eastern façade of La Rochelle

== See also ==
- List of historical societies in Maine
