= West Street Historic District =

Historic district in Maine, United States

- U.S. National Register of Historic Places
- U.S. Historic district
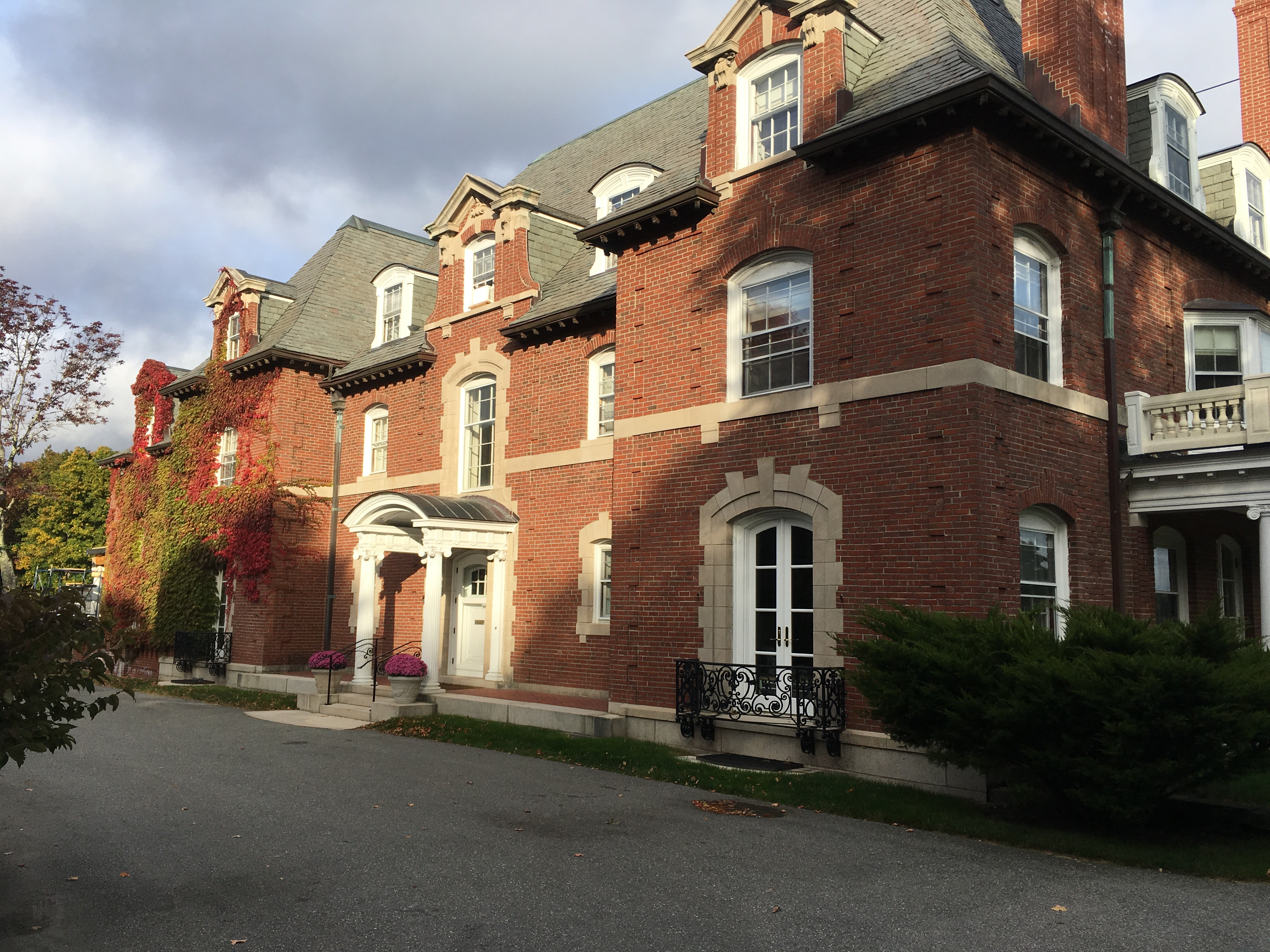
- "La Rochelle", completed in 1902

- Location within Maine Location within the United States
- Location: West St. between Billings Ave. and Eden St., Bar Harbor, Maine
- Coordinates: 44°23′26″N 68°12′36″W
- Area: 25 acres (10 ha)
- Architect: Multiple
- Architectural style: Late 19th And 20th Century Revivals, Late Victorian
- NRHP reference No.: 80000226
- Added to NRHP: May 6, 1980

The West Street Historic District is a residential historic district just adjacent to the main village of Bar Harbor, Maine. Extending from Eden Street to Billings Avenue, it encompasses a well-preserved concentration of summer "cottages" built during Bar Harbor's heyday as a resort for the wealthy in the early 20th century. The district was listed on the National Register of Historic Places in 1980.

== Description and history ==
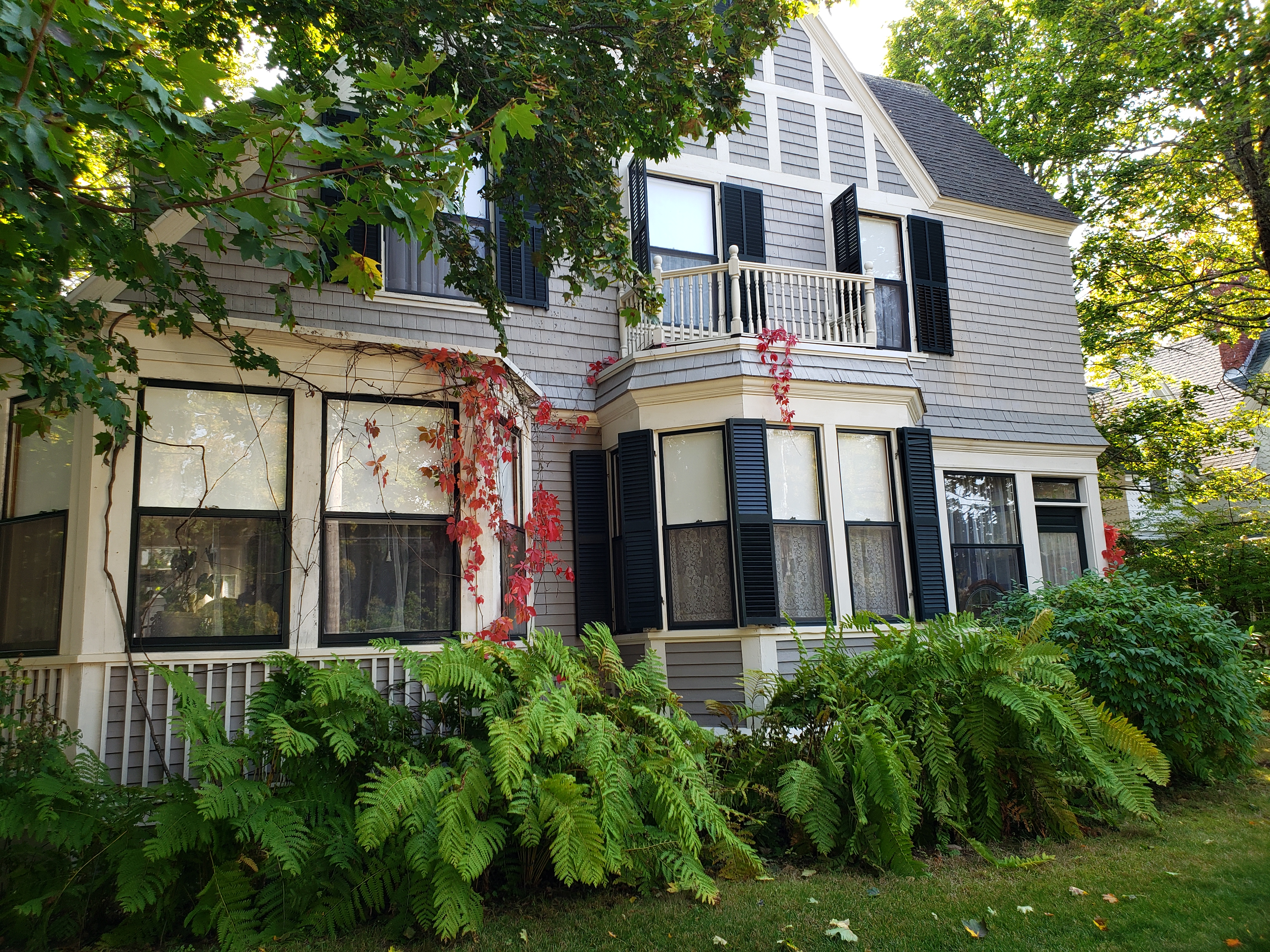
"Chantier", 116 West Street

The main village of Bar Harbor is set at the northeastern end of Mount Desert Island on the central coast of Maine. It occupies a nub of land that projects slightly from the surrounding coast, and has coastlines that run east–west and north–south. The central business district is located near the center of this nub, focused on the junction of Mt. Desert Street and Main Street. West Street runs parallel to Mt. Desert Street, providing access to the north portion of the coastline. The district extends along West Street from its western junction with Eden Street (where it abuts the Harbor Lane–Eden Street Historic District) to Billings Avenue in the east. Lining the street on both sides are seventeen historically significant summer houses, all built between 1870 and the 1910s, representative of the period when Bar Harbor grew to its height as an exclusive summer resort community. It is home to one of the best concentrations of these summer houses to survive the island's 1947 fire, which destroyed a significant number of such properties.

The oldest house in the district, "The Kedge", is a relatively modest Second Empire house that was built for A. Veazie (for whom it was formerly named) in 1871 and moved to the West Street area in 1886, when the street was formally laid out. It was modified in 1969 by Frederick Lincoln Savage when William Sterling was its occupant. "Petunia Cottage" (1877) was the first building to be built on what became West Street; it is a Queen Anne Victorian that was one of the first houses to be built as a rental property. Following the layout of the road there was a boom in construction, with a significant number of architect-designed properties built lining the waterfront. Stylistically these early houses are all reflective of the Shingle, Queen Anne, or Colonial Revival, which were popular at the time. Three houses were designed by the noted Boston firm Rotch and Tilden, and two were designed by New York architect William A. Potter.

In the early 20th century the houses began to increase in scale and elegance. The 41-room "La Rochelle", completed in 1902, is a lavish brick mansion in the style of a French chateau, and was one of the area's showpiece houses. It was purchased for around $4.5 million from the Maine Seacoast Mission by the Bar Harbor Historical Society in 2019. The Mission had named the building The Colket Center, after Campbell's Soup heirs Tristram and Ruth Colket, who donated the building to the organization in 1972, but "La Rochelle", which is carved into the masonry of the main gates, is the official name.

The principal non-residential property, the Bar Harbor Club, is a large Tudor Revival building erected in 1929-30; its early membership included many of society's elites. While some of these summer estates remain in private ownership, a number of them are now owned by Maine Seacoast Mission, a social service agency.

In 2017, the town of Bar Harbor revised its list of historic properties, which meant that those property owners will have imposed on them additional requirements should they wish to demolish or renovate said property. The West Street properties on the list:

- Manor House Inn, 106 West Street
- Foster Cottage, 108
- Petunia Cottage, 110
- The Bar Harbor Club, 111
- "Rosebriar", 111
- "The Kedge", 112
- "The Sunset", 115
- "Chantier", 116
- "Maisonette", 118
- "The Tides", 119
- "Westfield", 120
- "Saltair", 121
- "Greenlawn", 123
- "The Breezes", 125
- Charles Marinke Residence, 130

=== Gallery ===
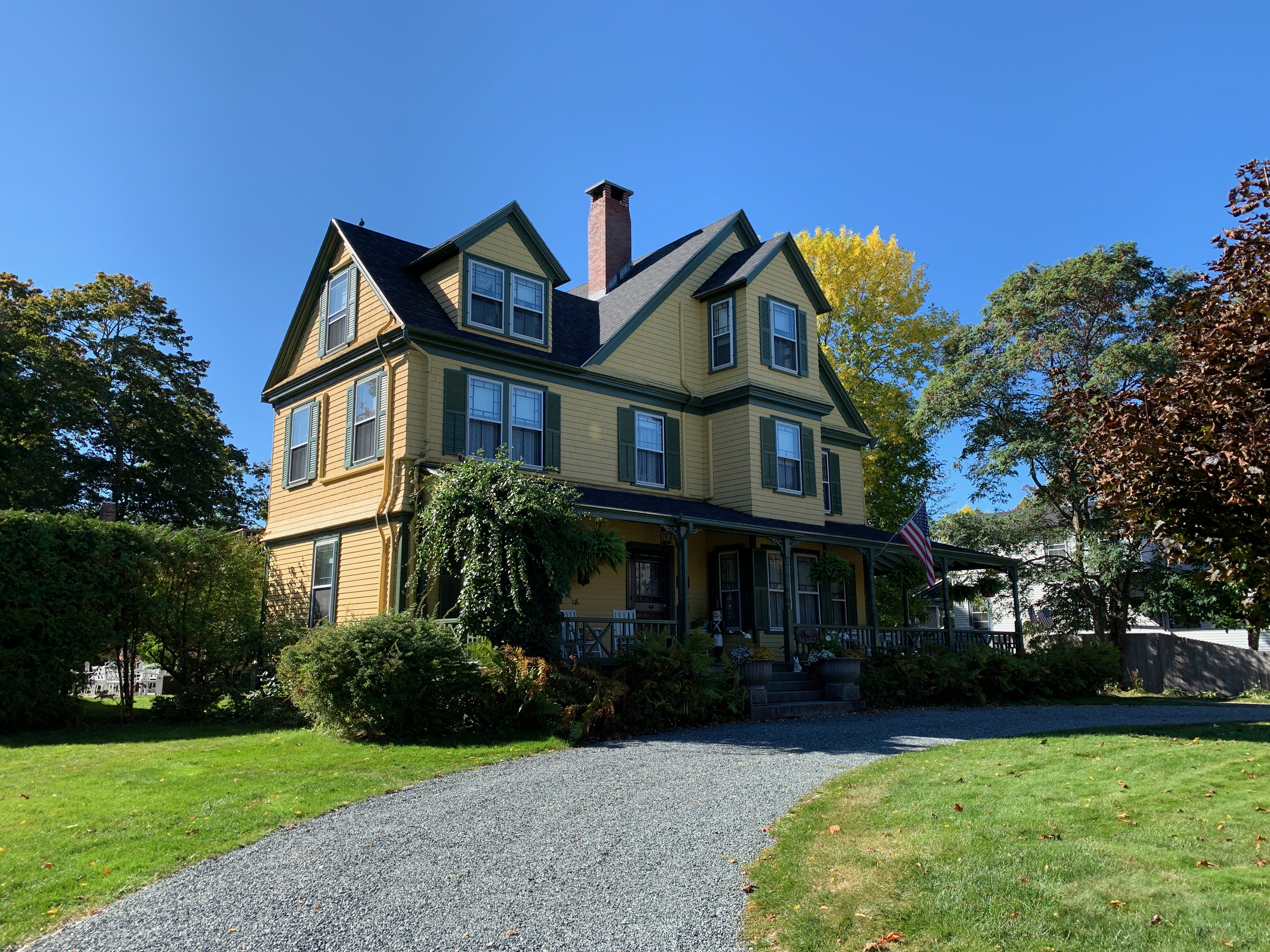
Manor House Inn

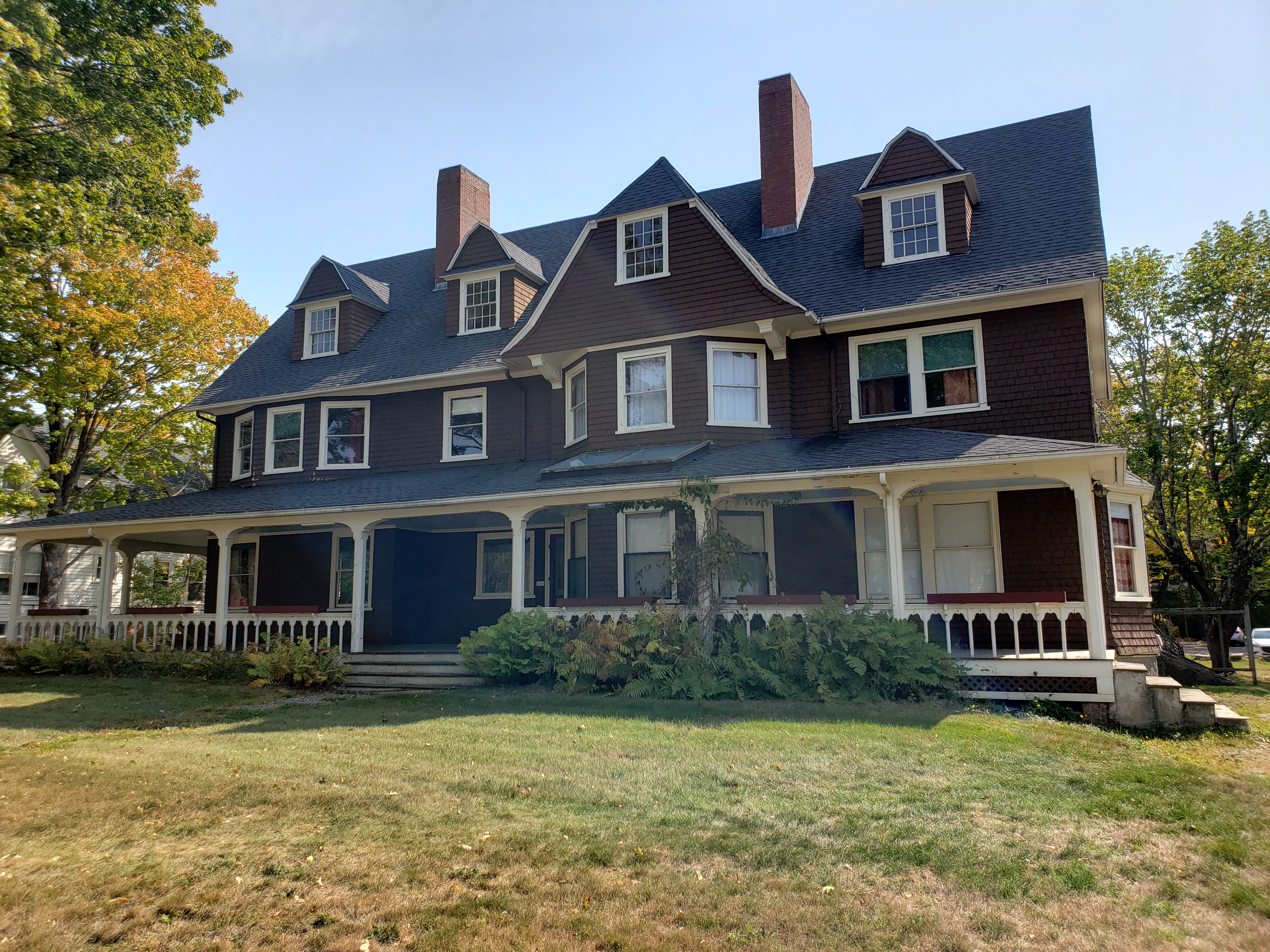
"Westfield"

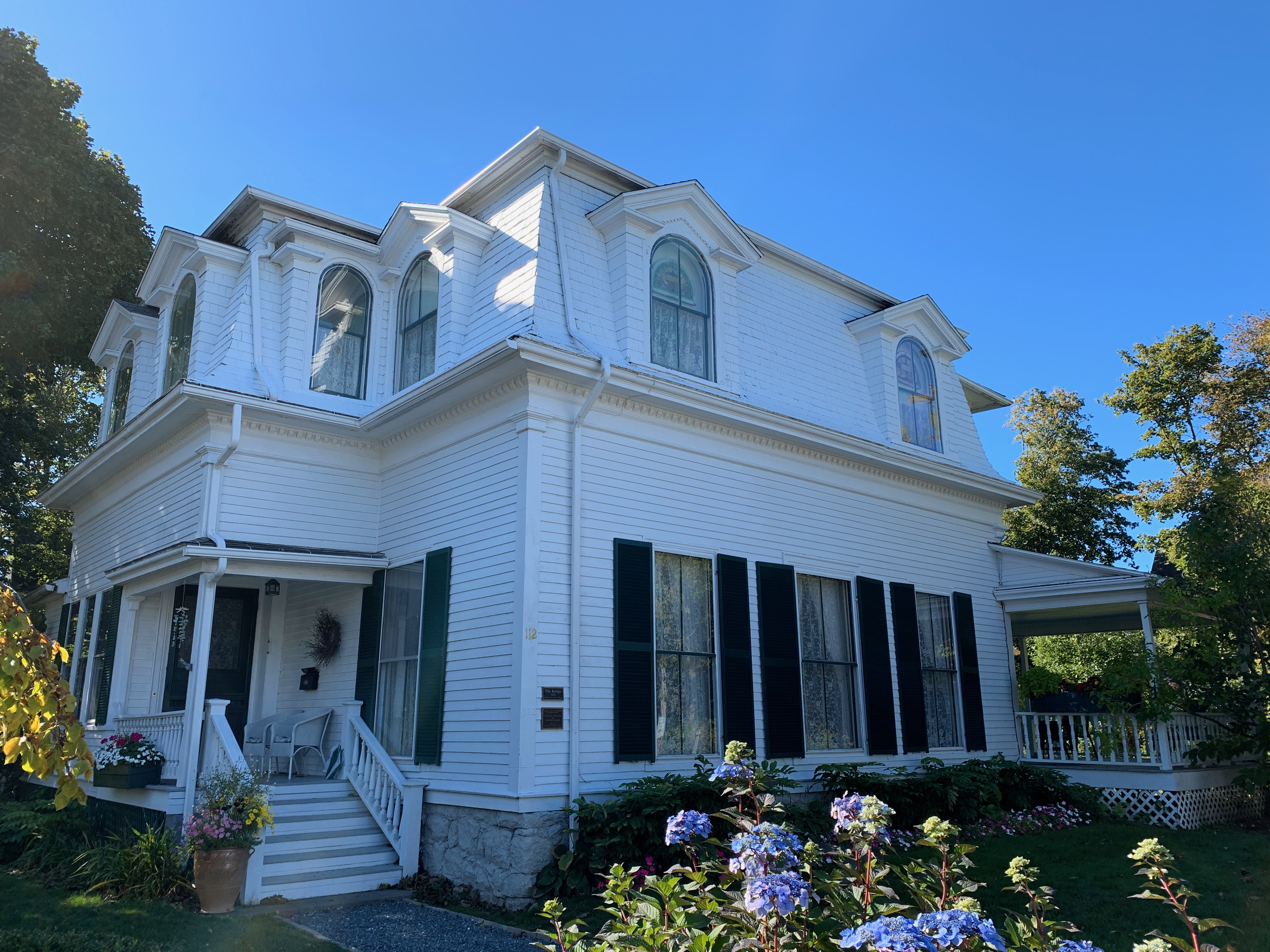
"The Kedge"

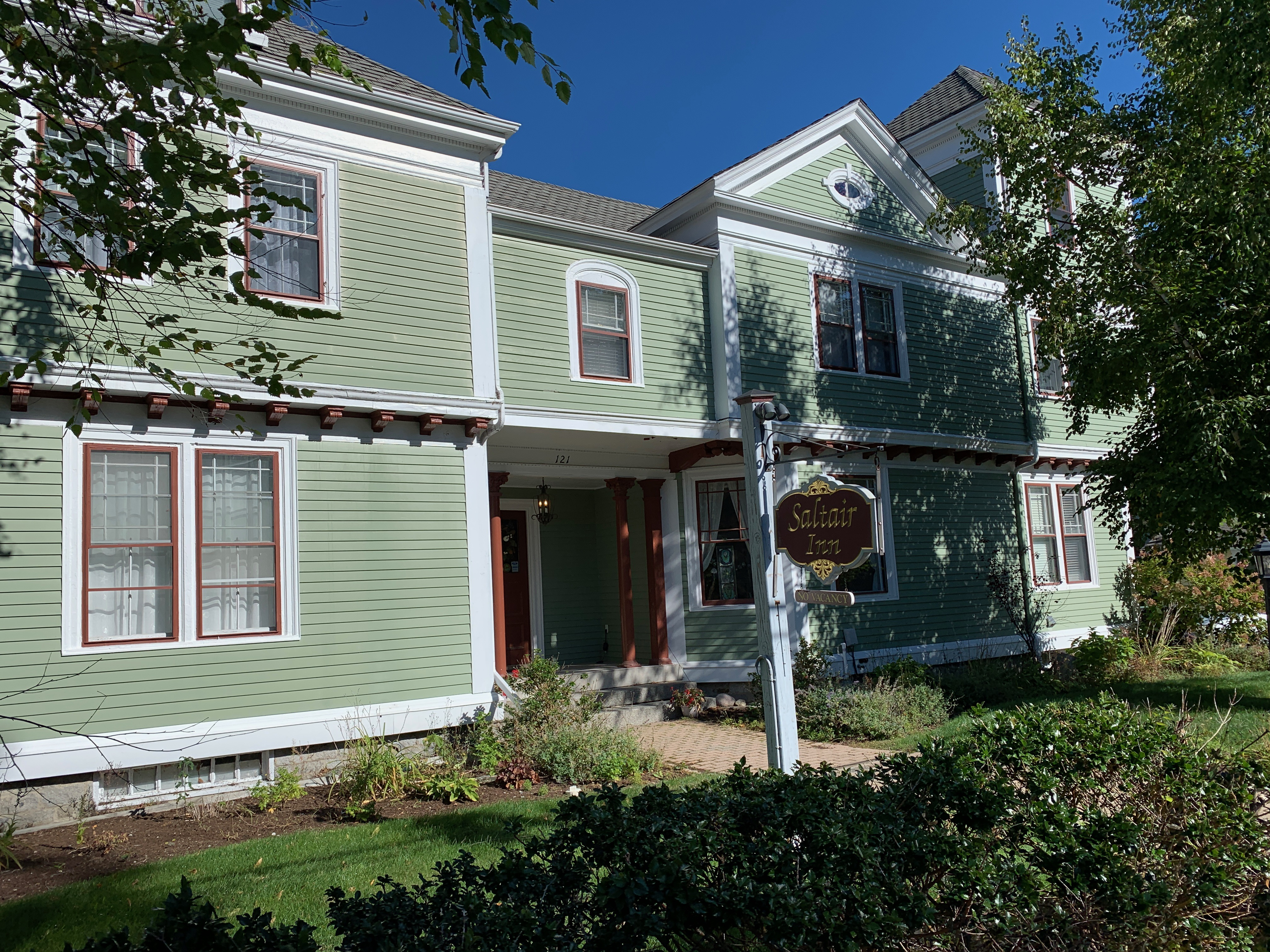
"Saltair"

== See also ==
- National Register of Historic Places listings in Hancock County, Maine
