= Ransford W. Shaw =

American politician (1857–1945)

Ransford W. Shaw (1857-March 13, 1945) was an American lawyer. Born in the border village of Centreville, New Brunswick, Shaw lived most of his life in Aroostook County, Maine. Shaw grew up in Mars Hill, Maine and attended Houlton Academy as a boarding student. Unable to pay tuition needed to attended Bates College, Shaw instead read law in a Houlton attorney's office and passed the bar exam in 1888. He served in the Maine Senate from 1893 to 1896. Shaw later served as the 36th Maine Attorney General from 1921 to 1924 alongside governor Percival P. Baxter. In 1937, he founded the Aroostook County Historical and Art Museum. When he died in 1945 at the age of 88, Shaw was still president of the Aroostook County Bar Association.
