= Birdsacre Sanctuary =

Historic house in Maine, United States

- Stanwood Homestead
- U.S. National Register of Historic Places
- Location within Maine Location within the United States
- Location: 289 High Street (Maine State Route 3), Ellsworth, Maine
- Coordinates: 44.3142°N 68.2418°W
- Area: 40 acres (16 ha)
- NRHP reference No.: 73000110
- Added to NRHP: January 19, 1973

Birdsacre Sanctuary, also known as Stanwood Wildlife Sanctuary, is an historic house museum and wildlife sanctuary at 289 High Street in Ellsworth, Maine, United States. The core of the property is a 40-acre (16 ha) parcel owned by the pioneering Maine ornithologist Cordelia Stanwood, whose home was opened as a museum in 1960, and is listed on the National Register of Historic Places in 1973. Stanwood's homestead was extensively damaged by an arsonist-set fire in 2014. The sanctuary, now 200 acres (81 ha), includes trails, an orchard, and a nature center that showcases a fine art and nature collection, including Cordelia J. Stanwood's avian field-notes and extensive photographic collection.

== Description and history ==
The Birdsacre Sanctuary is set south of Ellsworth's central business district, on the west side of Maine State Route 3, which connects Ellsworth to Bar Harbor. The Stanwood homestead, standing near the road, is a modest c. 1850 Cape style wood-frame house, which housed much original material, including artifacts of Cordelia Stanwood, prior to the 2014 fire. Stanwood was a self-taught ornithologist and naturalist who devoted 50 years of her life to studying the birds and nature of the area around her homestead. Following her death in 1958, community activists joined to acquire her property, which was opened as a museum and sanctuary in 1960. The efforts of the activists were led by Chandler S. Richmond who became the first curator of the sanctuary and museum.

The wildlife sanctuary, now enlarged to about 200 acres (81 ha), has a network of trails, some of which were laid out by Stanwood, and feature a variety of landscapes and habitats in which different types of birds may be observed. A nature center, built in 1990, houses a collection of mounted birds and mammals, as well as a collection of eggs and nests. Some parts of this collection are more than 100 years old.

The Stanwood homestead was devastated by a fire set on March 6, 2014, destroying much of the building's historic fabric, and a significant number of artifacts from Stanwood's life, including her camera and typewriter. Some artifacts, including many of her field notes, were spared by the flames.

== See also ==
- National Register of Historic Places listings in Hancock County, Maine
