= Maine Historical Society =

Historical society in Maine, US

- U.S. National Register of Historic Places
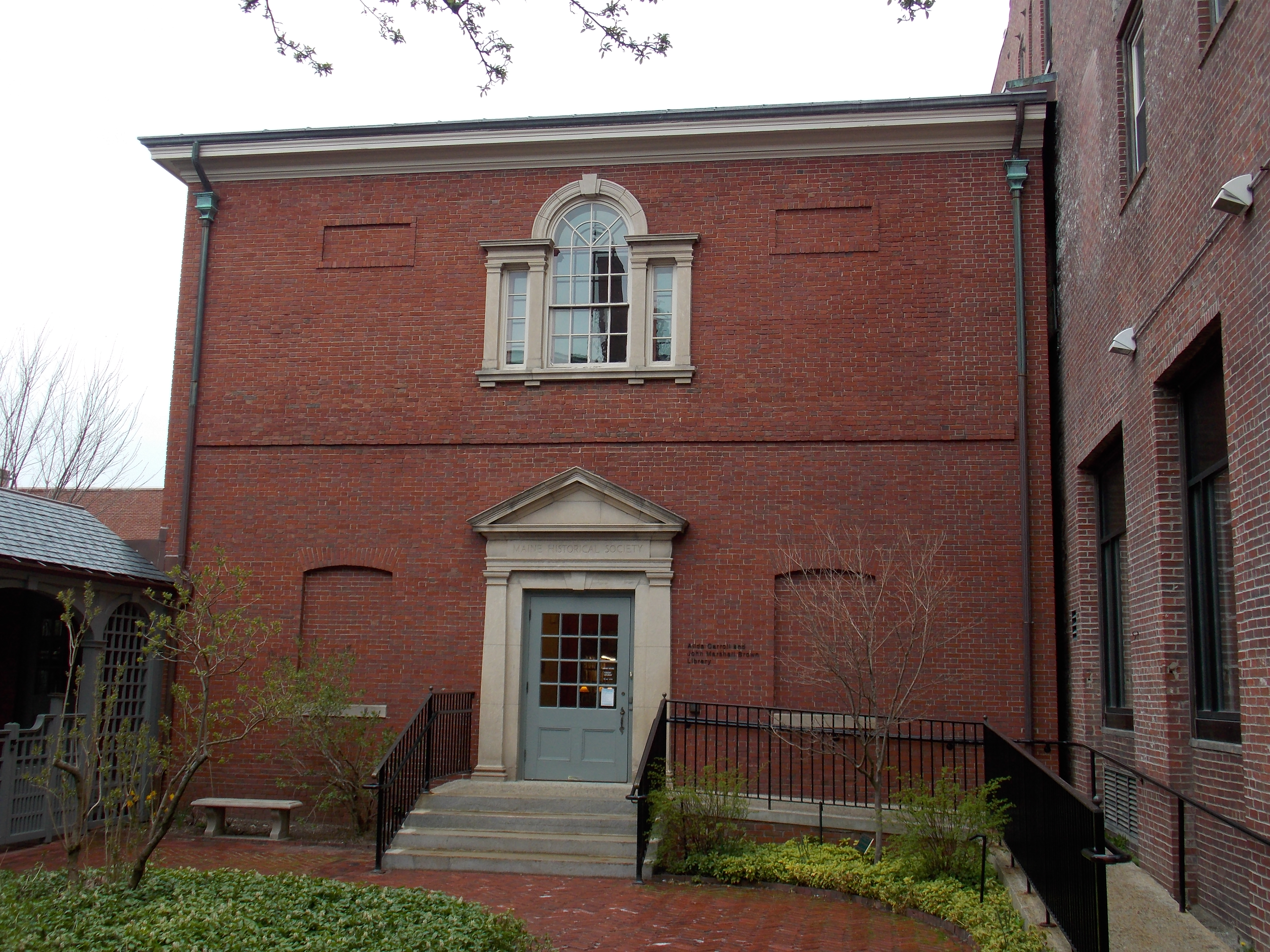
- The front of the Maine Historical Society

- Location within Maine Location within the United States
- Location: 485 Congress St; Portland, Maine
- Coordinates: 43°39′24″N 70°15′37″W
- Built: 1907
- Architect: Alexander Wadsworth-Longfellow, Francis H. Fasset
- NRHP reference No.: 80000230
- Added to NRHP: November 17, 1980

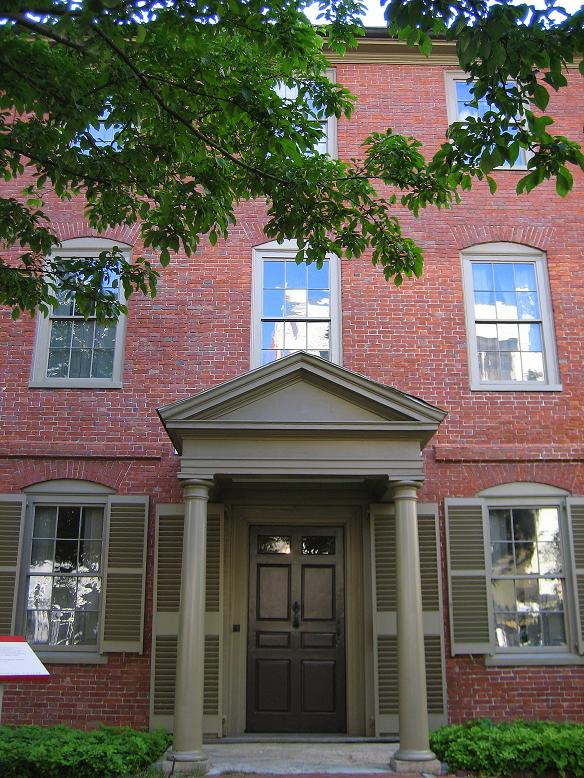
Wadsworth-Longfellow House, ca. 1785

The Maine Historical Society (MHS) is the official historical society of the U.S. state of Maine. It is located at 489 Congress Street in downtown Portland. The Society currently operates the Wadsworth-Longfellow House, a National Historic Landmark, Longfellow Garden, the Maine Historical Society Museum and Store, the Brown Research Library, as well as the Maine Memory Network, an online database of documents and images that includes resources from many of state's local historical societies.

== History ==
The Maine Historical Society was founded in 1822 and is the third-oldest state historical society after the Massachusetts Historical Society and New York Historical Society. Influential members of the Maine Historical Society included many of Maine's Yankee businessmen, intellectuals, philanthropists, and political figures, including James Phinney Baxter, Josiah Crosby and George J. Varney.

=== Presidents ===
William Willis, mayor of Portland, was the president of the Maine Historical Society from 1856 to 1865. James Phinney Baxter was president from 1889 to 1921. Earle G. Shettleworth Jr., state historian of Maine, was president of MHS from 1977 to 1979.

== Brown Library ==
The research library at the Maine Historical Society is named for John Marshall Brown and his wife Alida (Carroll) Brown. The current library building was built in 1907 (replacing the Morton Block), designed by Alexander Wadsworth Longfellow, nephew of the poet Henry Wadsworth Longfellow, and is listed on the National Register of Historic Places. The library underwent an extensive renovation in 2007, at which time it was named for the Browns. Since 1822, the Maine Historical Society has maintained a library collection. The holdings are dedicated to the history of Maine and include books, archival material, maps, newspapers, photographs, as well as engineering and architectural drawings. The library also collects on family history, specifically Maine, early New England and eastern Canada.

== Museum ==
The Maine Historical Society Museum is located at the Society's headquarters at 489 Congress Street, Portland. Topics for the changing exhibits include Maine's history, politics, culture, sports, religion, art, and business.

== See also ==
- History of Maine
- List of historical societies in Maine
- National Register of Historic Places listings in Portland, Maine
- William Hutchinson Rowe, former board member
- Rufus Cutler Libby, photographer
