= Cordelia Stanwood =

American ornithologist

Cordelia Johnson Stanwood
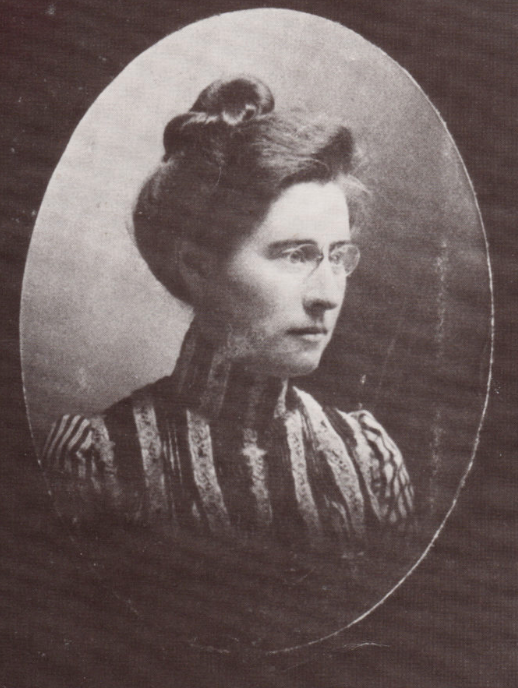
- Stanwood in 1900
- Born: January 8, 1865; Ellsworth, Maine USA
- Died: November 20, 1958 (aged 93); Ellsworth, Maine USA
- Education: Massachusetts College of Art and Design
- Known for: Founding of Birdsacre Sanctuary; Systematic investigations of bird behavior
- Scientific career
- Fields: Ornithology; Wildlife Photography

Cordelia J. Stanwood (1865 – 1958) was an American ornithologist, wildlife photographer, artisan, and writer. One of her primary achievements was the creation of Birdsacre Sanctuary, also known as the Stanwood Wildlife Sanctuary. During the course of her ornithological career, she made scientific observations of the behavior of approximately 100 bird species, at a time when there had previously been few scientific studies of bird behavior.

Prior to her career as an ornithological-photographer, Stanwood was a teacher and a school principal, teaching grammar and art. Her writings appeared in popular magazines and included 20 scholarly articles in ornithological journals.

== Early life and education ==
Stanwood was the first of five children born to parents who were a wealthy merchant's daughter and a sea captain in Ellsworth, Maine. Her father was Roswell Leland Stanwood and her mother was Margaret Susan Stanwood (née Brown). Stanwood was named after her aunt Cordelia Johnson. At times, the family sailed with the father Roswell Leland Stanwood.

Cordelia Stanwood was homeschooled until the age of 14, at which point she went to live with her aunt Cordelia Johnson, residing in Providence, Rhode Island. Stanwood often was known as "Cordie", a nickname she carried throughout her life. Growing up, her grandmother taught her various types of artisanship.

In 1886, Stanwood graduated from an all-girls' high school in Providence. For the next year, she trained to become a teacher at the Providence Training School for Teachers, which was a normal school. She graduated in 1887, and her first teaching job was at Messer Street Training School. Stanwood desired to become a Critic Teacher at the school, to supervise the training of student teachers. To this end, Stanwood studied at the Martha's Vineyard Summer Arts Institute for a summer. This was where she first met Henry Bailey, a botanical artist who eventually became a mentor and friend. to Stanwood. Five years after being hired as a teacher, Bailey persuaded Stanwood to attend the Normal Arts School, later known as the Massachusetts College of Art and Design in Boston, Massachusetts. Stanwood was also a principal at this time. Unable to find employment in Boston following graduation, she returned to Providence, Rhode Island, to resume teaching. Through the year 1900, Stanwood taught elsewhere in schools in Massachusetts and New York.

Stanwood passed several summers studying at the Martha's Vineyard Summer Arts Institute. Her experiences there re-kindled her interest in nature. She had opportunities to work with trained scientists, and she learned to combine the use of art and illustration in scientific observation, a skill that became instrumental in her career as an ornithologist. Stanwood deepened these skills in 1893 when she studied at the Massachusetts Normal Art School (later the Massachusetts College of Art)

== Ornithology ==
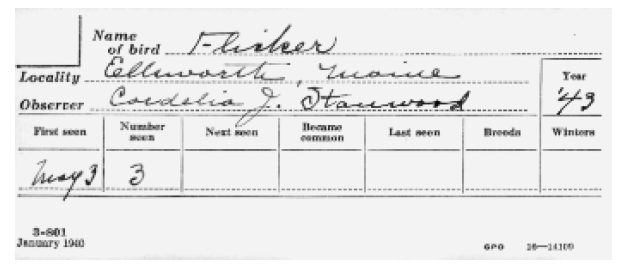
Report of a Migration Sighting of a Northern Flicker, by Cordelia J. Stanwood

At age 39, Stanwood had a "nervous breakdown", or neurasthenia, necessitating that she stop teaching, and was for several months at the Adams-Nervine Asylum. One historian reported that reasons for her neurasthenia included professional and financial pressures. As she recovered, Stanwood returned to her family home in Ellsworth, Maine, without resuming her teaching career.

As she was recovering from her illness, Stanwood began birdwatching. She photographed and wrote about various bird species, emphasizing behavior observations, of which little was previously known. As her scientific observations developed, Stanwood corresponded with leading naturalists of the time, including John Burroughs and Frank Chapman. She published her findings in ornithological journals and various popular publications such as: "The Boys Scouts’ Yearbook, House Beautiful, Farm Mechanics, American Poultry Journal, and Nature Magazine."

Although she was born into a home of financial means, Stanwood had little financial resources remaining at that stage of life. As she desired to be financially able to provide for herself, she thereby carried out various farm chores and selling her homemade crafts to earn an income. Her crafts included picture frames and woven products such as ornate baskets and rugs. Articles she wrote that were published in farming magazines and various popular magazines provided further income. Naturalist and writer Marcia Bonta states in her biography of Stanwood: "Too proud to accept help from anyone, even her siblings, she was reduced in her old age to selling greeting cards from door to door."

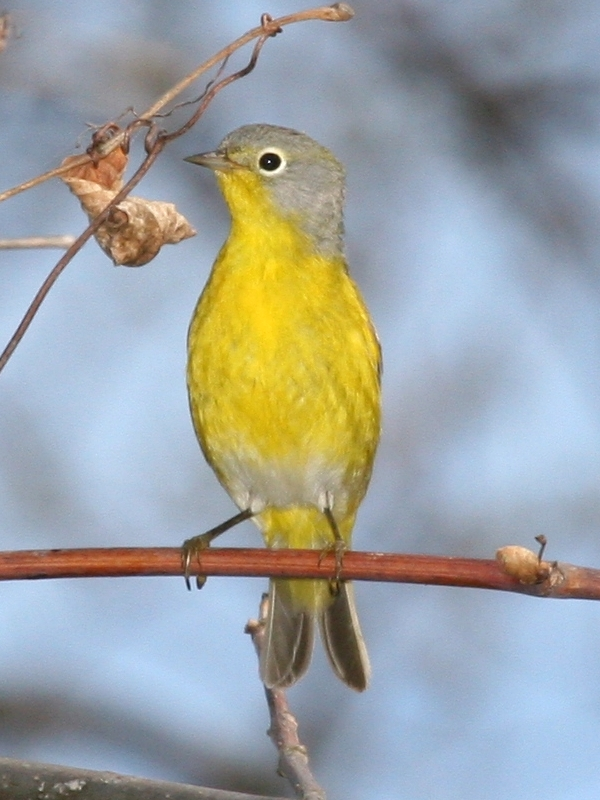
Nashville Warbler, a species described extensively by Stanwood

A particular area of expertise for Stanwood was the Wood warbler of Maine, more properly known as the Nashville warbler.

=== Wildlife photography ===
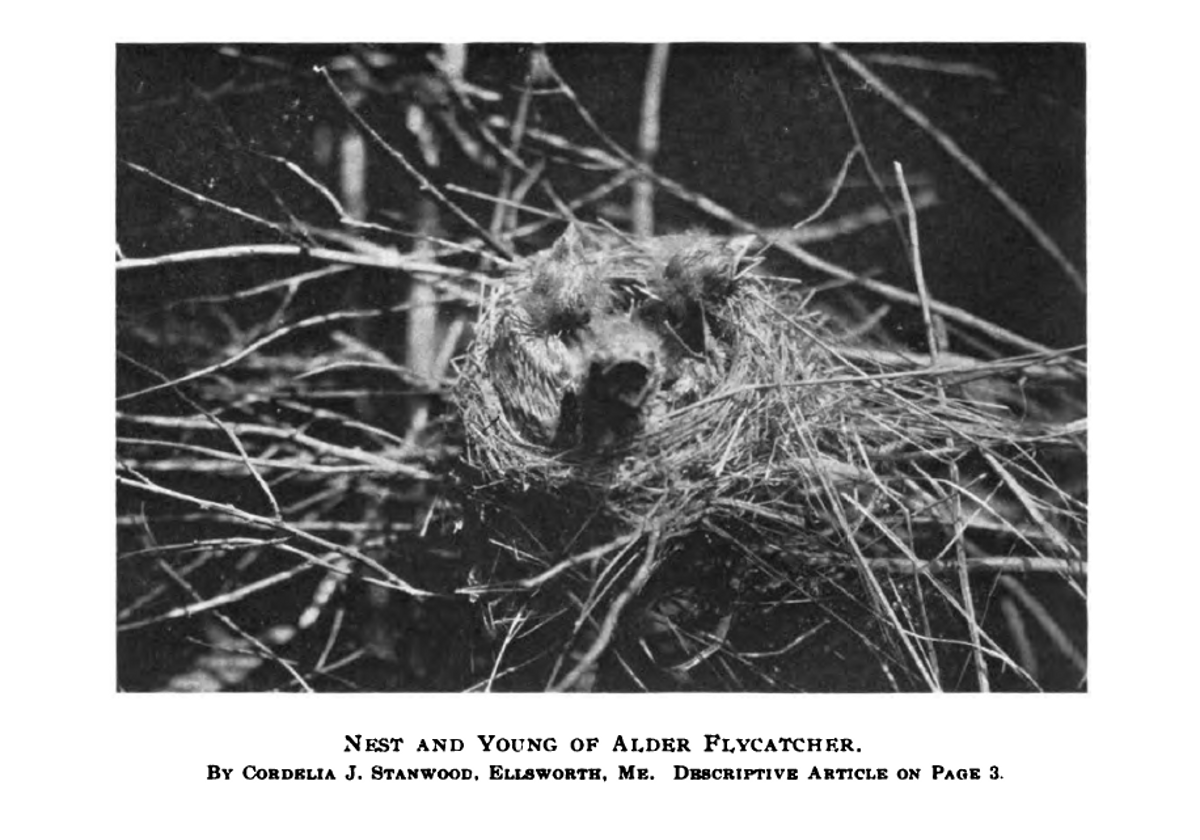
Photograph of an Alder flycatcher nestling by Stanwood

Stanwood documented many of her observations of bird behavior photographically. Initially, this was with a Kodak box camera. In 1910, Stanwood published her first ornithological study entitled, "The Hermit Thrush: the Voice of the Northern Woods." Her photography career started in 1916, and the American Ornithologist's Union presented her portrait in the Library of Congress in 1934. She later donated her photographs to the Acadia National Park and her notes to the Ellsworth Bird Club.

== Death and legacy ==
Stanwood died of cancer at age 93 on November 20, 1958. She had been living in a nursing home toward the end of her life.

Stanwood's 200 acre (81 hectares) homestead in Ellsworth became the Birdsacre Sanctuary and is on the National Register of Historic Places. Stanwood's writings, photographs, and findings are archived at Birdsacre Sanctuary as well as such places as the Smithsonian Institution. She wrote a book entitled Firs and Feathers about the birds of Maine, although the manuscript was never published.

Stanwood is reported to be the first female professional bird photographer, and 38 of her photographs were published in Edward Howe Forbush's book Birds of Massachusetts. She successfully lobbied the Maine State Legislature to ban the importation of bird feathers for women's hats.

The first curator of Birdsacre Sanctuary, Chandler S. Richmond, wrote a biography of Stanwood. As part of her legacy, Stanwood had founded the Cordelia Bird Club and had created the Stanwood Wildlife Foundation. Building on these two legacies, Richmond established the Birdsacre Sanctuary which opened in 1959.

While editor of the ornithological journal The Auk, Witmer Stone wrote in 1916 of Stanwood's investigations:

"Numerous sketches of birds and their nesting activities have appeared during the last few years from the pen of Miss Stanwood, all of them evidently based upon careful study and written in a style that is pleasing and yet serious enough to suit the importance of many of the facts that are recorded. These sketches can well be taken as models for others who have the time to make careful studies of the activities of birds' nests, and ability to set them down in bio-graphical sketches."

== Representative publications ==
- Stanwood, Cordelia J. “A Collection of Masterpieces in the Public Library or the Public Schools.” The Journal of Education, vol. 88, no. 21 (2207), 1918, p. 580.
- Cordelia J. Stanwood. “A Hermit Thrush Study.” The Wilson Bulletin, vol. 26, no. 4, 1914, pp. 180–86.
- Cordelia J. Stanwood. “A Series of Nests of the Magnolia Warbler.” The Auk, vol. 27, no. 4, 1910, pp. 384–89.
