= 33 Ledgelawn Avenue =

- St. Edward's Convent (former)
- U.S. National Register of Historic Places
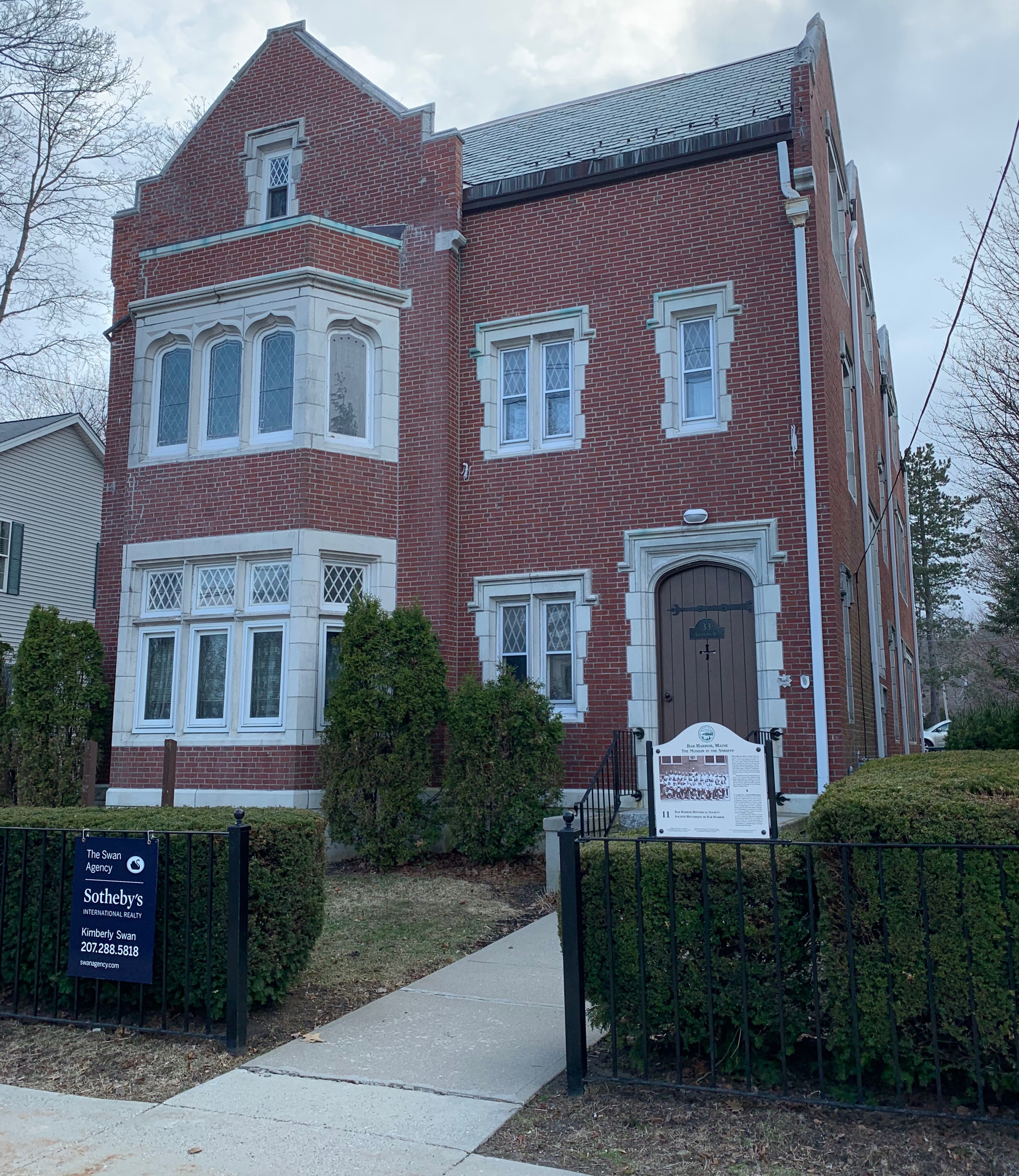
- The former convent in 2019

- Location within Maine Location within the United States
- Location: 33 Ledgelawn Avenue, Bar Harbor, Maine
- Coordinates: 44°23′7″N 68°12′30″W
- Area: less than one acre
- Built: 1917
- Architect: Milton Stratton
- Architectural style: Jacobethan Revival
- NRHP reference No.: 98001237
- Added to NRHP: October 8, 1998

33 Ledgelawn Avenue, formerly St. Edward's Convent, is a historic building in Bar Harbor, Maine. Designed by local architect Milton Stratton and completed in 1917, it is a locally significant example of Jacobethan Revival architecture. The building was added to the National Register of Historic Places on October 8, 1998, for its architectural significance. It later served as the headquarters and museum of the Bar Harbor Historical Society from 1997 until the society moved to the La Rochelle mansion in 2019.

== Architecture and building history ==
The building stands on the west side of Ledgelawn Avenue, a residential side street in the main village of Bar Harbor. It is a 2 1/2-story brick building, three bays wide, with a cross-gabled roof and a projecting section occupying the left half of the front façade. This projection is fronted by a large, two-story, flat-roofed bay with a band of three windows across the front and single windows on its angled sides.

The first-floor windows have lower sashes topped by diamond-pane transoms, while the second-floor windows have larger diamond panes in fixed sashes and are set within stone surrounds with Tudor arches. The main entrance is slightly recessed in the rightmost bay of the façade. The remaining front windows are smaller but likewise feature diamond-pane sashes and stone surrounds characteristic of the Jacobethan Revival style.

The building was designed by Bar Harbor architect Milton Stratton and constructed in 1917 with funding from Edward de Veau Morrell and his wife, Louise Drexel Morrell, of Philadelphia. The Morrells owned a summer estate in Bar Harbor and financed the convent for religious use. The National Register documentation identifies the building as a locally significant example of Jacobethan Revival architecture.

Louise Drexel Morrell was a sister of Saint Katharine Drexel. According to the Bar Harbor Historical Society, Katharine Drexel stayed at St. Edward's Convent while visiting her sister in Bar Harbor. The chapel on the second floor contains stained-glass windows depicting Edward and Louise Morrell.

The building has eighteen rooms, including ten bedrooms, as well as a second-floor chapel. It contains approximately 4,909 sq ft (456.1 m^{2}) of floor space.

The Bar Harbor Historical Society purchased the former convent in November 1997 and used it to house its collections and museum exhibits. In early 2019, the society moved its archives and collections to the La Rochelle mansion on West Street. The former convent was subsequently sold in 2020.

== See also ==
- National Register of Historic Places listings in Hancock County, Maine
