= Northern Maine Museum of Science =

Natural history museum in Presque Isle, Maine

- Established: 1994
- Location: Presque Isle, Maine
- Coordinates: 46°40′20″N 68°01′02″W
- Type: Natural history
- Owner: University of Maine at Presque Isle
- Website: pages.umpi.edu/nmms

The Northern Maine Museum of Science is a natural history museum in Presque Isle, Maine. Located on the campus of the University of Maine at Presque Isle, it was founded in the early 1970s when Leroy Norton, an Aroostook County naturalist donated a significant number of pieces, including sea shells and local forestry examples. It expanded again in the 1970s when it received a large portion of the defunct Portland Museum of Natural History. It is located in Folsom Hall on the UMPI campus. Exhibit topics include biology, mathematics, physical science, astronomy, chemistry, geology, forestry and agriculture.
