= Moses Hutchins House =

Historic house in Maine, United States

- U.S. National Register of Historic Places
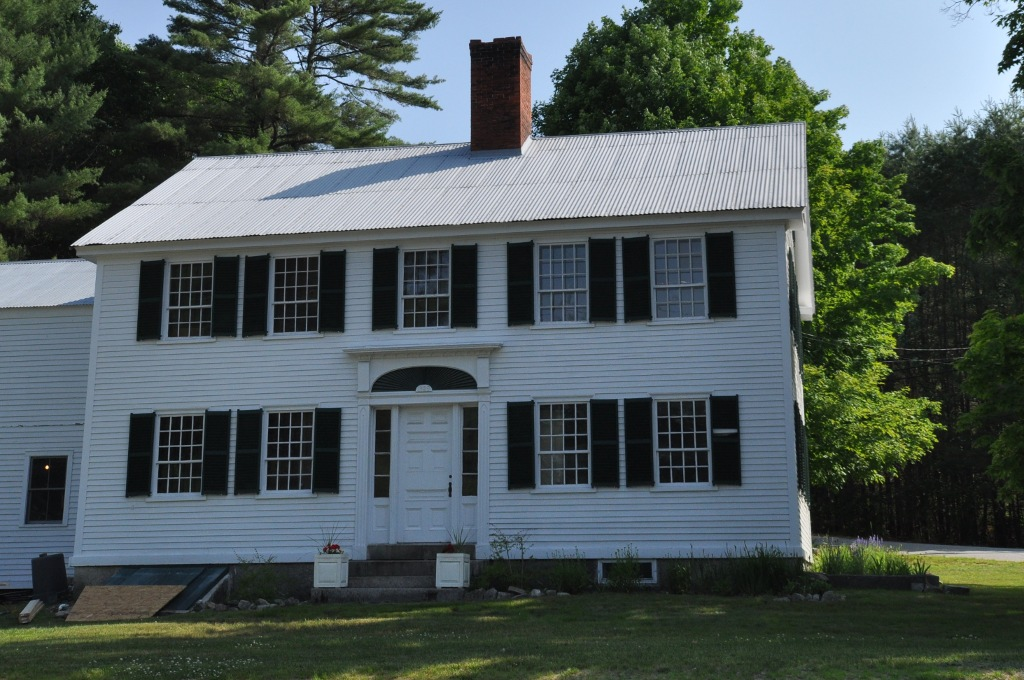

- Location within Maine Location within the United States
- Location: Jct. of ME 6 and Old Stage Rd., Lovell, Maine
- Coordinates: 44°8′51″N 70°53′2″W
- Area: 0.5 acres (0.20 ha)
- Built: 1839
- Architectural style: Federal
- NRHP reference No.: 03000290
- Added to NRHP: April 22, 2003

The Moses Hutchins House, also known as the Kimball-Stanford House, is a historic house at the junction of Old Stage Road and Maine State Route 6 in Lovell, Maine. Built c. 1839, this two story wood-frame house and attached barn have retained their Federal period styling, while exhibiting the adaptive alteration of early farmsteads over time. The house was listed on the National Register of Historic Places in 2003.

== Description and history ==
The main block of the Hutchins house is a 2 1/2-story wood-frame structure, five bays wide, with a side gable metal roof, large central chimney, and a granite foundation. The main entry is centered on the southwest-facing main facade, framed by a Federal-style surround with sidelight windows, fluted pilasters, and a fan set in an entablature above the door. A two-story ell extends northwest from the main block, joining it to a modified English barn.

The interior of the house follows a typical central-chimney plan. The entrance opens into a narrow vestibule, which includes a narrow, winding staircase leading to the second floor. Parlor rooms lie to either side, and the kitchen is centered behind the chimney, with two small flanking chambers. The northwest chamber has been transformed into a narrow hall leading to the ell and a second staircase leading upstairs. The ell, apparently built in stages, has several spaces on the first floor; on the upper level, the right section has two bedrooms, while the center one houses an unfinished work room. The left-most section, adjacent to the barn, was apparently designated as a corn crib, although it does not seem well-suited to that purpose. The barn is a 2 1/2-story structure, originally a classic English barn, which has had a section added to its front, and its roof reoriented 90 degrees.

The house and barn were built c. 1839 by Moses Hutchins, and parts of the connecting ell were probably built not long afterward. The property was purchased in 1867 by Elbridge Kimball, who added the second staircase and further extended the ell. It is unclear when the barn was modified, especially in relationship to the final section of the ell, which connected it to the house.

The house is now owned by the Lovell Historical Society, which uses it as a museum and research center.

== See also ==
- National Register of Historic Places listings in Oxford County, Maine
