= Aroostook County Historical and Art Museum =

Historic house in Maine, United States

- White Memorial Building
- U.S. National Register of Historic Places
- Location within Maine Location within the United States
- Location: 109 Main St., Houlton, Maine
- Coordinates: 46°7′33″N 67°50′17″W
- Area: 0.3 acres (0.12 ha)
- Built: 1903
- Architect: Kendall, Taylor & Stevens
- Architectural style: Colonial Revival
- NRHP reference No.: 80000376
- Added to NRHP: January 15, 1980

The Aroostook County Historical and Art Museum is located in Houlton, Maine. The museum was founded in 1937, after its building, a 1903 Colonial Revival house, was donated to the town by the White family. The building was listed on the National Register of Historic Places in 1980. The Houlton Museum's collections include artefacts and documents from Ricker Classical Institute and Ricker College; the photography collection of E. B. White; militaria and domestic objects; and art from the Houlton POW camp from WWII. The building is commonly known as the Donworth House, for MacIntyre's daughter, Mrs. Marion L. Donworth, who lived there after her mother's death.

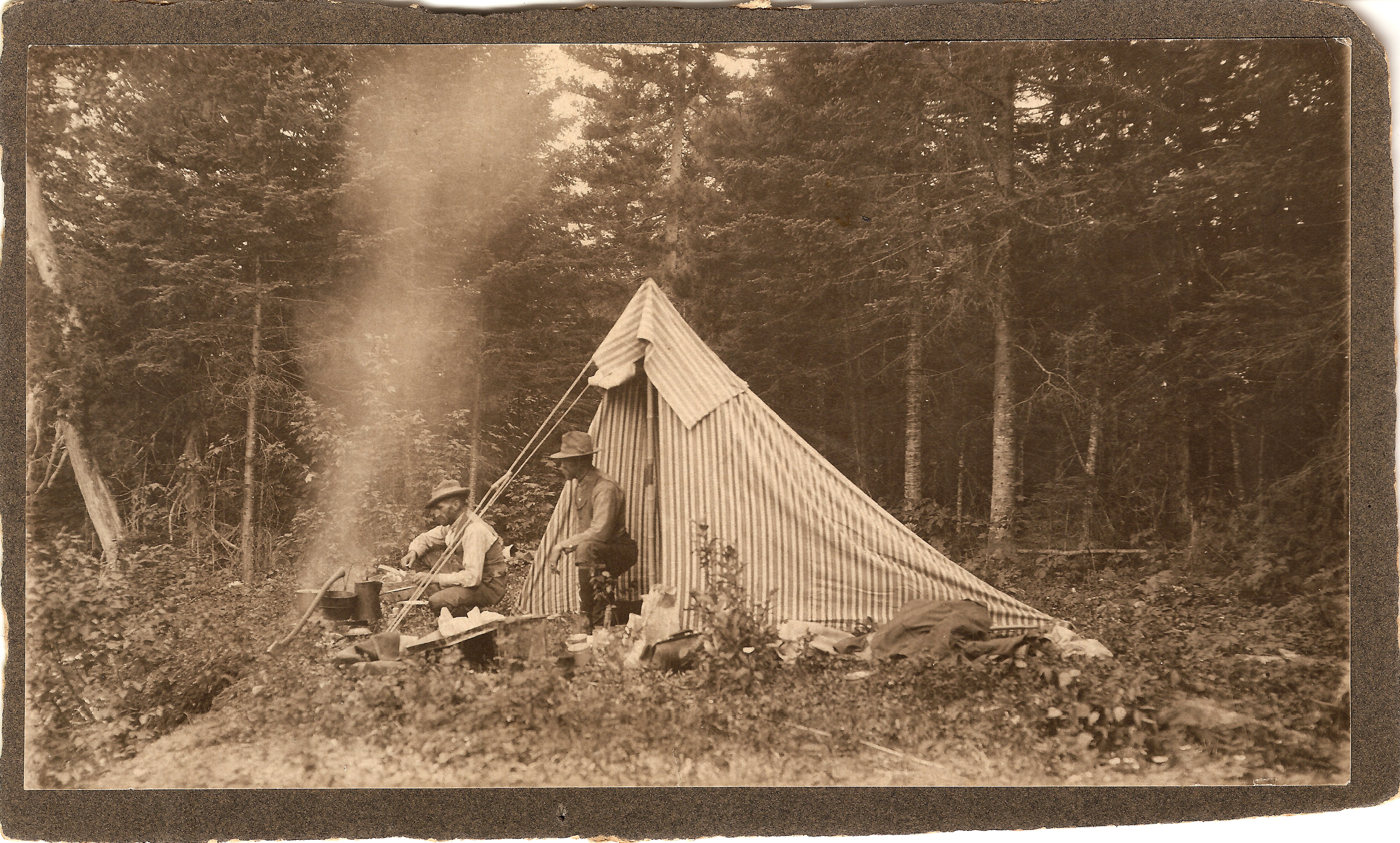
E. B. White and Walter Mansur on one of many hunting trips.

Armistice Day in Market Square Houlton, November 11, 1919.

== Collection ==
- The Ricker Room
- The Military Room
- Sarah Houlton Kitchen
- The Children's Room
- Fancy Goods Room
- Dining Room
- Edward B. White Photo Collection
- Camp Houlton & POW Camp
- Col. Frank M. Hume

== History ==
The house was built in 1903 by Mary Louise (Woodbury) MacIntyre, whose father, Eben Woodbury, had built three successive houses on this property, all of which were destroyed by fire (the most recent in the town's 1902 fire). After her death in 1934, the house was purchased by Stella King White, who donated it to the town for use as a museum. The building also houses the Houlton Chamber of Commerce on the first floor.

=== Early years ===
The museum was founded by former Attorney General Ransford W. Shaw in 1937. Shaw was always interested in the town's history. He served as President of the Museum from its founding until his death when he was succeeded by B. B. McIntire. Shaw said, in 1937: “When I made the suggestion to maintain a museum in Houlton, it received such a warm response that a public meeting was called at the court house where a corporation was formed to be known as the ‘Aroostook Historical and Art Museum’. After many trails and disappoints, on May 1, 1938, I rented a room in the Nickerson Block over Fishman's Store.” Mr. and Mrs. S. L. White donated the home. Articles of historic interest were collected and by 1948 the museum had listed over 1200 articles. Arthur Brown became interested in the work and acted as curator. Edith Donald was elected to fill Brown's place. Elizabeth Lakin, daughter of the R. W. Shaw, has served as president of the organization.

== Architecture ==
The museum stands on the south side of Main Street, east of Houlton's downtown area, between Broadway and Kelleran Streets, and just east of Cary Library. It is a handsome two-story Colonial Revival structure, designed by Kendal, Taylor and Stevens of Boston, Massachusetts. Its dominant feature is a two-story portico covering the center three bays of the five-bay facade. It is supported by four Tuscan columns, with matching pilasters and has an entablature topped by a denticulated cornice. The main entrance has an elegant surround of pilasters supporting an entablatured lintel with consoles. The interior has retained its original period woodwork.

== See also ==
- National Register of Historic Places listings in Aroostook County, Maine
- List of museums in Maine
