= Wendell Gilley =

American bird watcher and artist (1904–1983)

- Born: Wendell Holmes Gilley; August 21, 1904; Tremont, Maine, U.S.
- Died: April 24, 1983 (aged 78); Southwest Harbor, Maine, U.S.
- Occupations: Wood carver, plumber

Wendell Holmes Gilley (August 21, 1904 – April 24, 1983) was a bird watcher and artist who carved birds in wood on Mount Desert Island, Maine. He started out carving two-inch wooden birds for Abercrombie & Fitch.

== Biography ==
Gilley was born in Tremont, Maine, the son of Frank L. Gilley and Maud Gilley. He was married to Addie Lorinda Bragdon Gilley and had a son, Leonard, who was a poet and college professor.

Wendell Gilley Museum
- Established: 1981
- Location: 4 Herrick Road; Southwest Harbor, Maine
- Coordinates: 44°17′01″N 68°19′37″W
- Type: Art Museum
- Website: www.wendellgilleymuseum.org

Gilley built the Red Rooster camp in Surry, Maine, which he decorated with his own animal carvings, and had a plumbing business in Southwest Harbor, Maine. He published a book, The Art of Bird Carving (1961). He was president of the National Wood Carvers Association. He died in 1983, in his late seventies. His cousin, Frank R. Gilley, bought the Red Rooster camp, and donated Gilley's works and tools to become a museum.

== Wendell Gilley Museum ==
The Wendell Gilley Museum in Southwest Harbor, which opened in July 1981, displays hundreds of examples of Gilley's work. The museum also features works by other woodcarvers, including a collection of miniature waterfowl by the Cape Cod carver who inspired Gilley, A. Elmer Crowell.
