= Museum of African Culture =

In Portland, Maine with Sub-Saharan African tribal art

Coordinates: 43°39′22″N 70°15′36″W

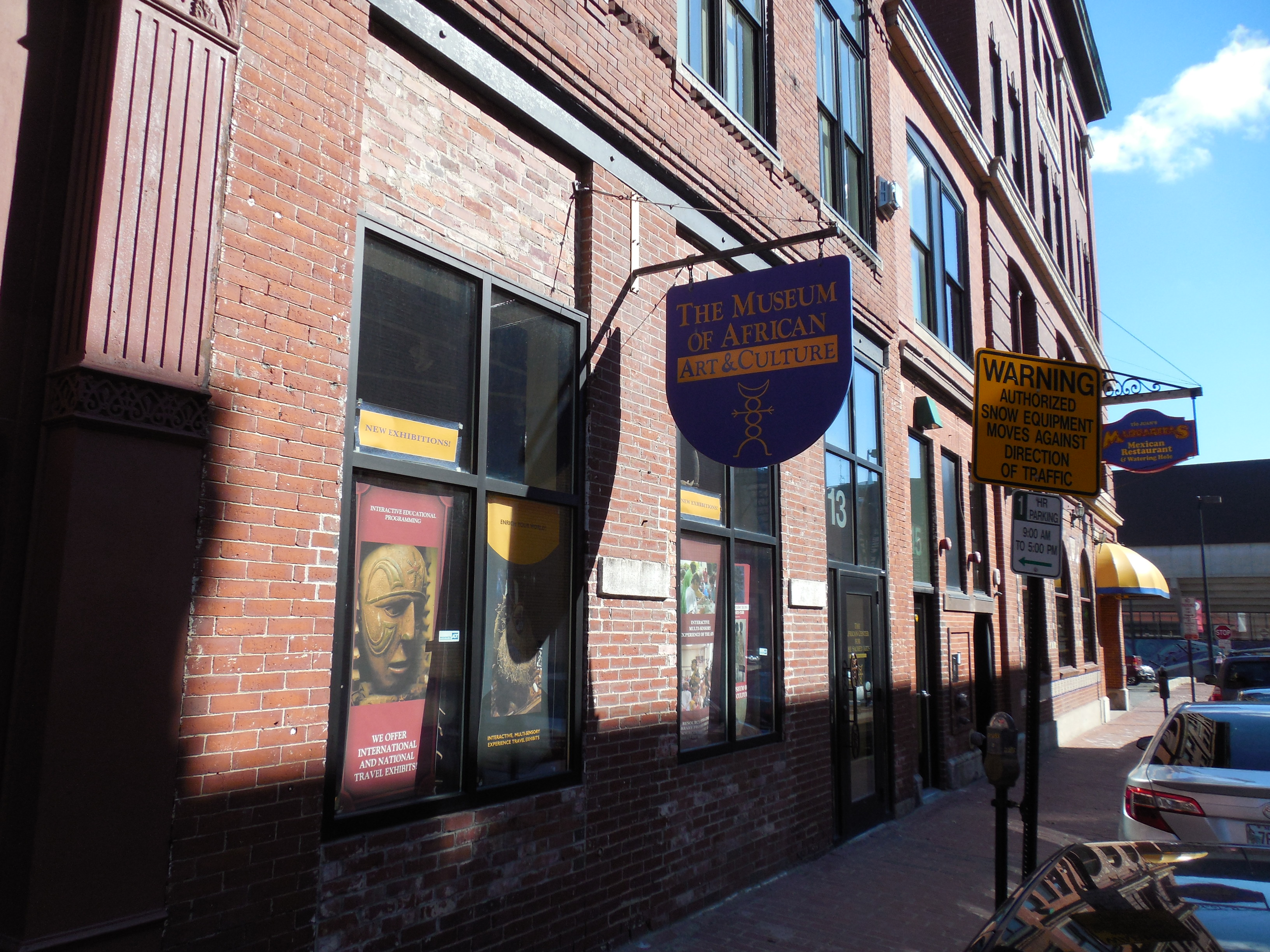
The former location of the Museum of African Culture in Portland

The Museum of African Culture Is a museum in Newfield, Maine, United States, that specialized in Sub-Saharan African tribal art and culture. Changing exhibits included art inspired by the African diaspora, and the museum's programs included music, storytelling, films, poetry, literature, healing ceremonies and other Sub-Saharan African cultural traditions. Collections included wooden masks, figures, textiles, household objects and tools. It is the only museum in northern New England devoted to African arts and culture and has over 4,500 pieces of art

It was formerly located in Portland, Maine.
