= Redington Museum =

Historic house in Maine, United States

- Redington House
- U.S. National Register of Historic Places
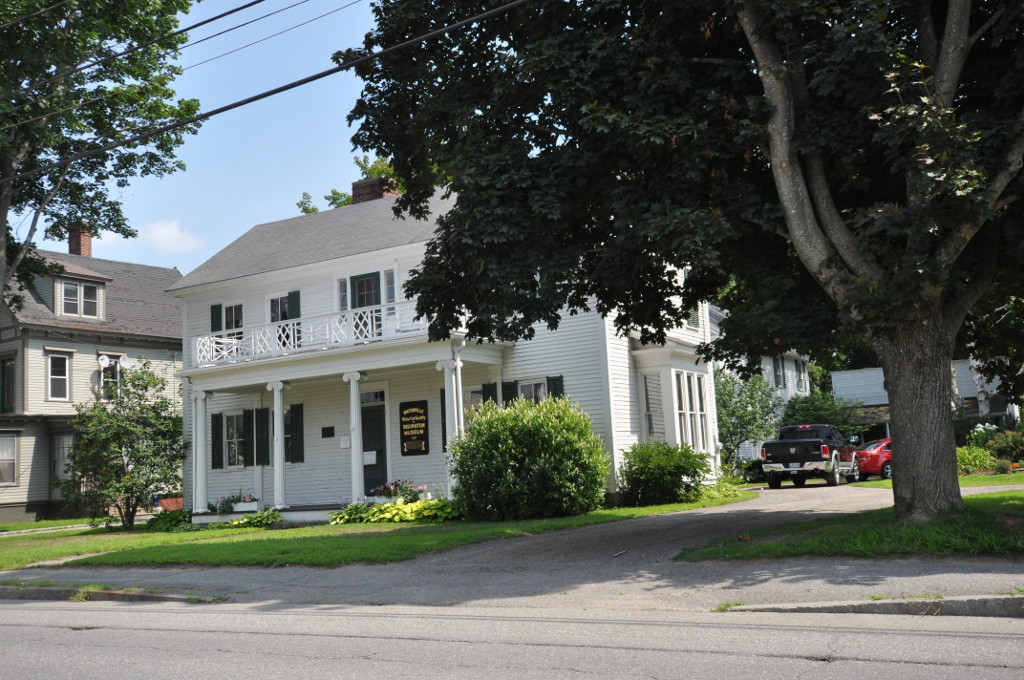

- Location within Maine Location within the United States
- Location: 62 Silver St., Waterville, Maine
- Coordinates: 44°32′49″N 69°38′5″W
- Area: 0.5 acres (0.20 ha)
- Built: 1814
- Built by: Redington, Asa
- Architectural style: Federal
- NRHP reference No.: 78000180
- Added to NRHP: July 21, 1978

The Redington Museum or Redington House is a historic house and museum in Waterville, Maine that is listed on the National Register of Historic Places. The museum is the headquarters of the Waterville Historical Society. Built in 1814, it is one of the best-preserved houses of the period in the city. It has served since 1924 as the museum and headquarters of the Waterville Historical Society, and was listed on the National Register of Historic Places in 1978.

The museum is listed on the official website of the Maine Office of Tourism.

== Location ==
The museum is open between Memorial Day and Labor Day from Tuesday to Saturday. Visitors are supposed to enter during the tour times, which are at 10 a.m., 11 a.m., 1 p.m. and 2 p.m. In practice, they may allow admission other times. Therefore, one should be prepared to visit as if they had an appointment for a specific time although the curators may allow other visitors to enter. There is an admission charge of $5 for adults 18 and older. Children 17 and younger are free when accompanied by an adult.

The museum is located at 62 Silver Street about 2 blocks south of downtown Waterville, about one block south of the funeral home.

== Exhibits ==
The Redington Museum offers a comprehensive view of life in New England and Waterville, Maine during the past two centuries. There are collections of furniture, accessories, household artifacts, toys, tools, and weapons as well as historical papers and diaries. The main building is designed in the Federal-style of architecture. The museum is maintained by the Waterville Historical Society.

The museum is essentially a historic house that has period furniture and exhibits about the Waterville area as well as a replica pharmacy building near the site where the original building once stood. The curators are a couple who live on the premises.

The museum is a two-story white shingled house built in 1814. The exhibits include old furniture and curios from the 1800s. The museum opened in 1927. It is part of the National Register of Historic Places.

The Waterville Historical Society keeps its collection of books and manuscripts at the museum. There is a collection of rare old maps of the area available for scholarly research.

== Description and history ==
The Redington House stands on the southeast side of Silver Street (Maine State Route 137) in central Waterville, between Western Avenue and Silver Place. It is a 2 1/2-story wood-frame structure, with a gabled roof, two interior brick chimneys, clapboard siding, and granite foundation. The front facade is five bays wide, with the outer bays closely spaced but offset from the center. The entrance, at the center, is sheltered by a single-story porch which extends across the center three bays, and is supported by fluted Ionic columns with an ornate wooden railing above. Most of the windows are sash, but that above the entrance is flanked by sidelights. The interior retains original period finishes. Extending to the rear of the main block are later wood frame additions.

The museum is housed in a two-story home built in 1814 by pioneer Waterville settler Asa Redington, a veteran of three enlistments in the American Revolutionary War and a member of George Washington's elite Honor Guard. After the victory against the English, he developed the water rights at Ticonic Falls and with his sons, Samuel and William, established a thriving flour mill on the banks of the Kennebec River. The father of six sons and three daughters, Asa built this substantial home for his son William. Fashioned of great hewn timbers, all hand pegged, it still features the original spiral staircase, fireplaces with period woodwork, and floors of wide pumpkin pine. The newel post in the entrance exhibits the "contractor's peace stone," a small smooth polished stone signifying in Colonial times that the project had been completed to both the owner's and builder's satisfaction. Today, five rooms are furnished with antiques of the late 18th and early 19th centuries from the Redington family, the family of pioneer attorney Timothy Boutelle, the family of revolutionary war veteran Jabez Mathews, and from other early local families. It remained in the hands of Redington's descendants until 1924, when it was given to the Waterville Historical Society by Mrs. William Redington. The society now uses it as its headquarters and museum.

== See also ==
- National Register of Historic Places listings in Kennebec County, Maine
