= Little Lyford Pond camps =

The Little Lyford Pond camps is a historic logging camp located in the Maine Woods.

== Early history ==
The camps were opened in 1874, bordering the West Branch of the Pleasant River in northern Maine in the United States. They included a main lodge and 13 cabins as well as satellite camps for housing loggers. The camps are a 2.2 mile hike from Gulf Hagas and a 5.2 mile hike from the Appalachian Trail's famed 100-Mile Wilderness. They are located approximately 20 miles (32 km) east of Greenville and 30 miles (48 km) northwest of Brownville.

== Leased to private individuals 1960–2003 ==
In 1960 Gale and Mary Torrey of Poland, Maine leased the camps and land from several paper companies. There were very few roads in the area at that time and access was via a 4-wheel drive road starting from a parking lot at Big Lyford Pond near Kokadjo and proceeding southerly along the west side of the Pleasant River. The camps were open only in the warm months and catered primarily to fly fisherman looking for brook trout. Electricity was via a generator. The "Clean Waters Act" of the 1970s was responsible for the creation of miles of logging roads in this area and the camps became much less remote. In 1977 the Frantzman family leased 300 acres (1.2 km^{2}) of land and around 14 wood dwellings from the paper company that owns the camps. There are two lakes and a river within a mile of the site. There is no electricity, and water is gravity fed from a spring. The Frantzmans made renovations on the site, which they ran as the Little Lyford Pond Lodge. Outhouses were constructed and placed on skids so they could be moved and the manure put to use. A greenhouse was built that used photovoltaic cells (solar cells) to power a hot water heater for a shower. There is a sauna and a root cellar. The cabins were next leased by the Fackelman family in 1987 and was later leased to the Leroys in the 1990s. The camps still exist and are maintained by the Appalachian Mountain Club.

== AMC Ownership ==
The camps are maintained by the Appalachian Mountain Club. "When we learned the LeRoys were looking for new owners for the camps, we saw it as a rare opportunity to continue the tradition of providing quiet recreational opportunities while protecting this special place for generations to come," said Director Walter Graff. "The camps are an ideal place to continue our commitment to outdoor recreation, education, and backcountry stewardship for the benefit of the public."

The AMC purchased the wilderness camps in June from Bob and Arlene LeRoy, who have managed the Moosehead-region camps for six years The current manager of the lodge is Matthew Ward of Bucksport, Maine.
