= Middle Branch Pleasant River =

Location
- Country: United States

Physical characteristics
- Source
  - location: Maine
  - elevation: 1,180 feet (360 m)
- Mouth
  - location: East Branch Pleasant River
  - coordinates: 45°22′59″N 69°03′29″W
  - elevation: 360 feet (110 m)

Basin features
- Progression: East Branch Pleasant River – Pleasant River – Piscataquis River – Penobscot River

The Middle Branch Pleasant River is a tributary of the Piscataquis River in Piscataquis County, Maine. From the outflow of Middle Branch Pond (45°29′27″N 69°05′26″W) in Maine Township 5, Range 9, WELS, the river runs 11.4 miles (18.3 km) southeast to its confluence with the East Branch in Brownville. The East Branch runs about 1.5 miles (2.4 km) further south, joining with the West Branch to form the main stem of the Pleasant River.

== See also ==
- List of rivers of Maine
