= Katahdin Iron Works =

- Katahdin Ironworks
- U.S. National Register of Historic Places
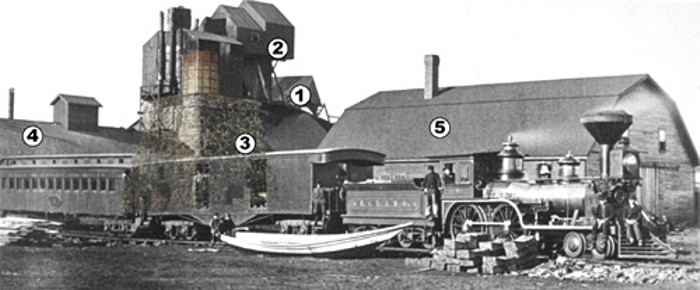
- Historic view of the iron works. Annotations are as follows: ore kiln (1), top houses (2), furnace (3), casting shed (4) and storage barn (5).

- Location within Maine Location within the United States
- Interactive map of Katahdin Ironworks
- Nearest city: Brownville Junction, Maine
- Coordinates: 45°26′40″N 69°10′30″W
- Area: 17.8 acres (7.2 ha)
- Built: 1843
- Architectural style: Bee Hive
- NRHP reference No.: 69000011
- Added to NRHP: December 23, 1969

The Katahdin Iron Works is a Maine state historic site located in the unorganized township of the same name. It is the site of an ironworks which operated from 1845 to 1890. In addition to the kilns of the ironworks (of which only one survives), the community was served by a railroad and had a 100-room hotel. The site was listed on the National Register of Historic Places in 1969.

The state's property contains Gulf Hagas, a canyon on the West Branch of the Pleasant River that is a National Natural Landmark. About a mile and a half downriver is another national landmark, "The Hermitage", a roughly 35-acre (14 ha) grove of large Eastern White Pine trees that is preserved by The Nature Conservancy. In 2003, the Appalachian Mountain Club acquired a 37,000-acre (15,000 ha) property upriver from Gulf Hagas that it named Katahdin Iron Works.

== Iron Works ==
Early European surveyor Moses Greenleaf translated the Abenaki name Munnalammonungan for the west branch of the Pleasant River as "very fine paint." About 1820 he found Ore Mountain of orange, yellow, and red iron oxide pigments used for Abnaki paints. It was identified as a limonite gossan in 1843. Samuel Smith built a road from Brownville, Maine in 1841 and then built a company town where the West Branch of the Pleasant River flows out of Silver Lake. The town included the American Lumber Company sawmill, boarding house, cooperative store, town hall, school, post office, stables, and homes for 200 families. Stonemasons then built a 55-foot high rock blast furnace with water-powered blowers. They also built eighteen stone beehive kilns to convert wood to charcoal for producing about 2,000 tons of pig iron annually.

The gossan became the primary source of mined ore in 1845. The ore was roasted to drive off sulfur dioxide. Smith sold the operation to David Pingree who organized the Katahdin Iron Works. When pig iron sold slowly, Pingree built a puddling refinery to produce wrought iron. The Boston market for wrought iron remained poor, and the iron works ceased operation from 1857 until the American Civil War increased iron demand in 1863. When Pingree died, a group of Bangor, Maine businessmen formed the Piscataquis Iron Works Company to take over the operation in 1876. They refurbished the boarding house as the Silver Lake Hotel for the tourist trade; and hired a Swedish mining engineer in 1877 to improve the iron by reducing the silicon content. The 19-mile (31-km) Bangor and Katahdin Iron Works Railway was built in 1881 to connect the town with what would become the Bangor and Aroostook Railroad at Milo, Maine.

The railway began operating in 1882, but a hurricane fanned sparks from the kilns into a fire which caused major damage to the plant. By 1885 a rebuilt plant was selling high quality iron for railroad car wheels and cruiser engines for the United States Navy. Production ceased in 1890 when the costs of diminishing supplies of charcoal became uncompetitive with large supplies of coke available to Pennsylvania producers.

The gossan deposit overlies a pyrrhotite deposit of iron sulfide ore. Assuming the depth matches the known surface area, this deposit would be among the world's largest sulfide deposits. However, the rural location and poor quality of the ore continues to make it uneconomic to mine.

=== Bangor and Katahdin Iron Works locomotives ===
Number	Builder	Type	Date	Works number	Notes
1	Amoskeag Locomotive Works	4-4-0	1852		originally Maine Central Railroad #43; named Black Moria; became Bangor and Piscataquis Railroad #6; retired 1899
2	Hinkley Locomotive Works	4-4-0	1868	867	named Argyllite; retired 1887
3	Manchester Locomotive Works	4-4-0	January 1884	1172	purchased new; became Bangor and Piscataquis Railroad #7; then Bangor and Aroostook Railroad #209; scrapped 1914

The Bangor and Katahdin Iron Works Railroad was leased to the Bangor and Piscataquis Railroad in 1887. Annual conversion 10,000 cords (36,000 m³) of wood to charcoal exhausted local forests by 1888. Iron with lower sulphur content became available from Michigan. Most of the smelting equipment was shipped to Nova Scotia in 1890. The Bangor and Piscataquis Railroad became the Bangor and Aroostook Railroad in 1891. The Bangor and Aroostook Railroad discontinued train service to Katahdin Iron Works in 1922; but Katahdin Iron Works postmistress Sara Green operated a flanged-wheel automobile over the abandoned tracks until the rails were removed in 1933. The state has restored the blast furnace and one of the beehive charcoal kilns; these and some of the foundations for other buildings are all that remain of the mill and village.

Records from the mill can be found at the University of Maine's Fogler Library.

== Gulf Hagas ==
Gulf Hagas is a two and a half miles (4.0 km) long water-formed canyon. The river falls 500 feet (150 m) in the canyon, including multiple waterfalls. It is sometimes called the "Grand Canyon of the East". It is an eight-mile (round trip) side trip off the 100-Mile Wilderness section of the Appalachian Trail.

== See also ==
- National Register of Historic Places listings in Piscataquis County, Maine
