= Pleasant River =

Pleasant River may refer to

== Canada ==
- Pleasant River, Nova Scotia, a community in Nova Scotia, Canada

== New Zealand ==
- Pleasant River (New Zealand), a river in Otago, New Zealand

== United States ==
- Pleasant River (Androscoggin River), a tributary of the Androscoggin River in Oxford County, Maine
- Pleasant River (Piscataquis River), a tributary of the Piscataquis River in Piscataquis County, Maine
- Pleasant River (Pleasant Bay), a river emptying into Pleasant Bay in Washington County, Maine
- Pleasant River (Presumpscot River), a tributary of the Presumpscot River in Cumberland County, Maine

== See also ==
- East Branch Pleasant River (disambiguation)
- West Branch Pleasant River (disambiguation)
- Middle Branch Pleasant River
