= West Branch Pleasant River =

West Branch Pleasant River may refer to:

- West Branch Pleasant River (Piscataquis River), a tributary of the Piscataquis River in Piscataquis County, Maine
- West Branch Pleasant River (Pleasant River), a tributary of the Pleasant River in Maine
- West Branch Pleasant River (Addison, Maine), a tributary of the Pleasant River in Washington County, Maine

== See also ==
- East Branch Pleasant River (disambiguation)
- Pleasant River (disambiguation)
