= East Branch Pleasant River =

East Branch Pleasant River may refer to:

- East Branch Pleasant River (Pleasant River tributary), tributary of the Pleasant River in the U.S. state of Maine
- East Branch Pleasant River (Piscataquis River tributary), tributary of the Piscataquis River in Piscataquis County, Maine

== See also ==
- West Branch Pleasant River (disambiguation)
- Pleasant River (disambiguation)
