= White Cap Mountain (Piscataquis County, Maine) =

Mountain in Maine

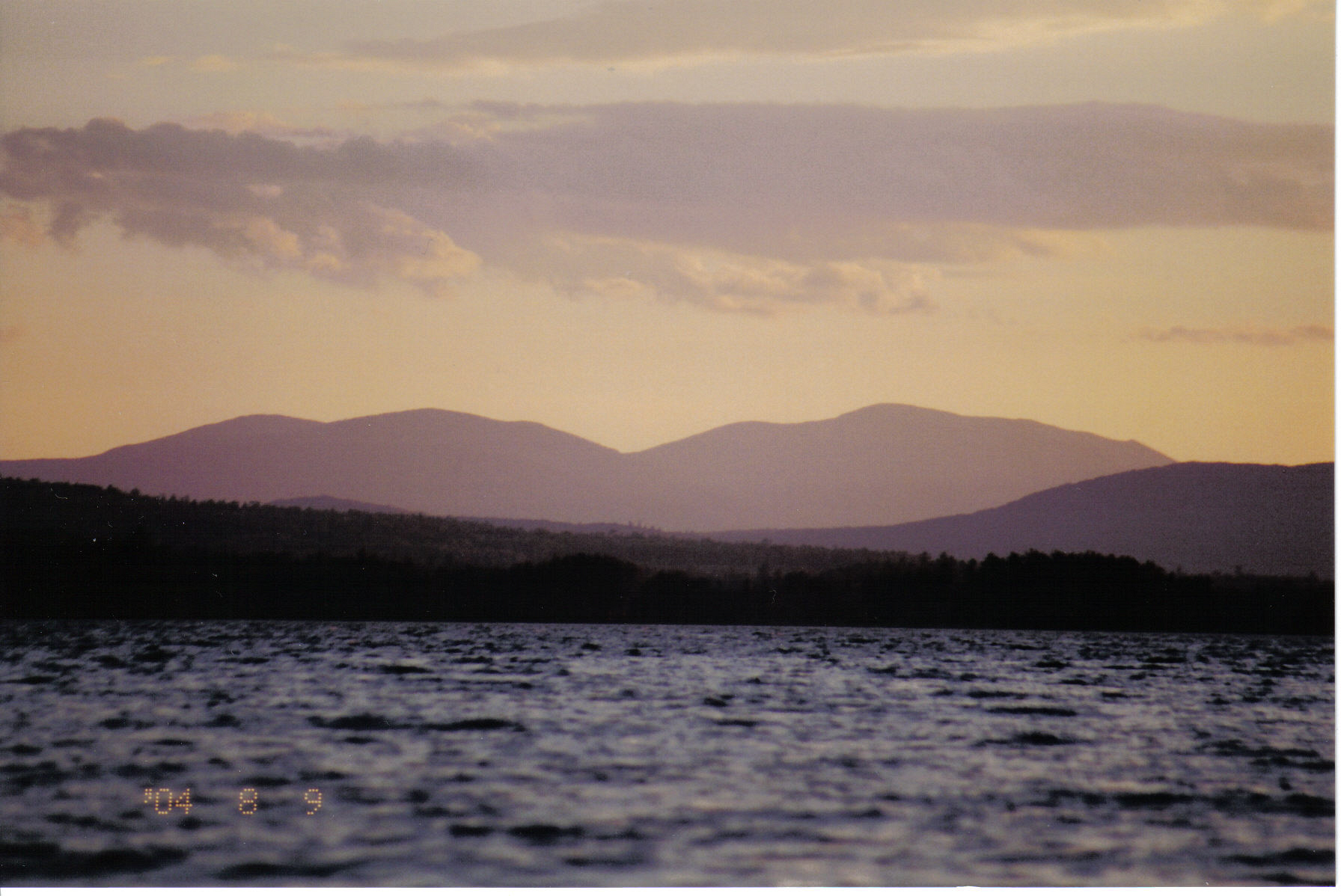
- Evening view from Millinocket area

Highest point
- Elevation: 3,654 ft (1,114 m)
- Prominence: 2,604 ft (794 m)
- Listing: #15 New England Fifty Finest
- Coordinates: 45°33′17″N 69°14′47″W

Geography
- Location within Maine
- Location: Piscataquis County, Maine, U.S.
- Topo map: USGS Big Shanty Mountain

White Cap Mountain is a mountain located in Piscataquis County, Maine. White Cap Mountain is flanked to the east by Hay Mountain, to the south by Big Spruce Mountain and to the southeast by Little Spruce Mountain.

White Cap Mountain lies within the watershed of the Pleasant River, a tributary of the Piscataquis River, which drains into the Penobscot River, and into Penobscot Bay. The east side of White Cap drains into B Inlet Brook, then into B Pond, Guernsey Brook, and the East Branch of the Pleasant River. The north and northwest sides of White Cap drain into the West Branch Ponds, then into the West Branch of the Pleasant River. The south side of White Cap drains into Greenwood Brook, then into the West Branch of the Pleasant.

The Appalachian Trail, a 2,170 mi (3,490 km) National Scenic Trail from Georgia to Maine, runs along the four-mile-long ridge of hills to the east, across the summit of White Cap.

== See also ==
- List of mountains in Maine
- New England Fifty Finest
