= Roughan =

Roughan may refer to:

- Roughan, a townland in Dungannon and South Tyrone Borough Council, County Tyrone, Northern Ireland
  - Roughan Castle, a castle in Roughan

== People with the surname ==
- Howard Roughan, American writer

== See also ==
- Roughan Hall, a historic building in Boston, Massachusetts, United States
