= Brownville Junction, Maine =

- Census-designated place
- Location within Maine Location within the United States
- Coordinates: 45°21′2″N 69°3′13″W
- Country: United States
- State: Maine
- County: Piscataquis
- Town: Brownville

Area
  - Total: 0.64 sq mi (1.66 km^{2})
  - Land: 0.64 sq mi (1.66 km^{2})
  - Water: 0 sq mi (0.00 km^{2})
- Elevation: 380 ft (120 m)

Population (2020)
  - Total: 506
  - Density: 788.7/sq mi (304.53/km^{2})
- Time zone: UTC-5 (Eastern (EST))
  - Summer (DST): UTC-4 (EDT)
- ZIP Code: 04415 (Brownville Junction); 04414 (Brownville)
- Area code: 207
- FIPS code: 23-08360
- GNIS feature ID: 2806289

Brownville Junction is a census-designated place (CDP) in the town of Brownville, Piscataquis County, Maine, United States. As of the 2020 census, Brownville Junction had a population of 506. It is in the west-central part of the town, on the west side of the Pleasant River, a south-flowing tributary of the Piscataquis River and part of the Penobscot River watershed. Maine State Route 11 passes through the community, leading south 3 miles (5 km) to Brownville village and 7 miles (11 km) to Milo, and northeast 31 miles (50 km) to Millinocket.

== History ==
The community came into existence in 1889 when the Canadian Pacific Railway built the International Railway of Maine as part of its transcontinental railroad, connecting Montreal, Quebec, with Saint John, New Brunswick. The railway crossed the older Bangor and Katahdin Iron Works Railway at the location that became the village. The rail lines are currently owned by the CPKC Railway after a period of different ownership.

Brownville Junction was first listed as a CDP prior to the 2020 census.

== Demographics ==
Historical population
Census	Pop.	Note	%±
2020	506		—
U.S. Decennial Census
