= Nelson Madore =

American politician

Nelson Madore (June 7, 1943 - December 24, 2020) was a Maine politician and academic. He was the Mayor of Waterville, Maine from 1999 to 2004, and professor of history, geography and government at Thomas College in Waterville. He retired from Thomas College after 40 years in 2009.

== Education and academia ==
Madore earned his BA in history and government in 1965 from the University of Maine and his MA in history from Maine two years later in 1967. He taught for two years at Penquis Valley High School in Milo, Maine. He began teaching courses at Thomas in 1969. He earned an EdD in Educational Administration from Vanderbilt University in 1982.

Madore co-authored and co-edited Voyages: A Maine Franco-American Reader in 2007. The anthology was noted as "the most important book published in American Studies in 2007" by a reviewer in the Canadian academic journal University Affairs, and it was presented to Nicolas Sarkozy, President of France, at a ceremony in Washington, DC, in November 2008.

== Local politics ==
Madore served in various levels of city government in Waterville; his positions included 18 years on the Waterville Board of Education, including 12 as chair. He served as the city's mayor from 1999 to 2004. He was replaced as mayor by businessman Paul LePage.

In 2006, Madore was a candidate to be the Democratic nominee for County Commissioner of Kennebec County, but lost to Zachary Matthews.
