= Harrigan Learning Center and Museum =

Museum in Maine

Coordinates: 45°16′04″N 68°59′34″W

The Harrigan Learning Center and Museum is a museum of geology and archaeology located in Milo, Maine.

The museum opened to the public in 2016.

== About ==
The museum is owned by the Three Rivers Milo-Brownville Kiwanis Foundation and functions as an educational center for children and a tourist destination.

The museum was built and donated by Tom and Nancy Harrigan as part of a $4 million complex in Milo intended to improve the Piscataquis region's economy. In 2018 the Harrigans were presented with the Myrick Award by the Executive Committee of the Piscataquis County Economic Development, for their contributions to the area including the Harrigan Learning Center and Museum. US Senator Susan Collins described the museum as "provid[ing] an exciting educational opportunity for the region’s young people.”

The museum has display cases filled with fossils, minerals, archaeological and Native American artifacts. The artifacts were both found locally and globally. Local photographers and artists also have exhibits at the museum. The museum has been visited by US House Representative Jared Golden and US Senators Angus King, and Susan Collins.
