= Appalachian Mountain Club =

U.S. non-profit organization

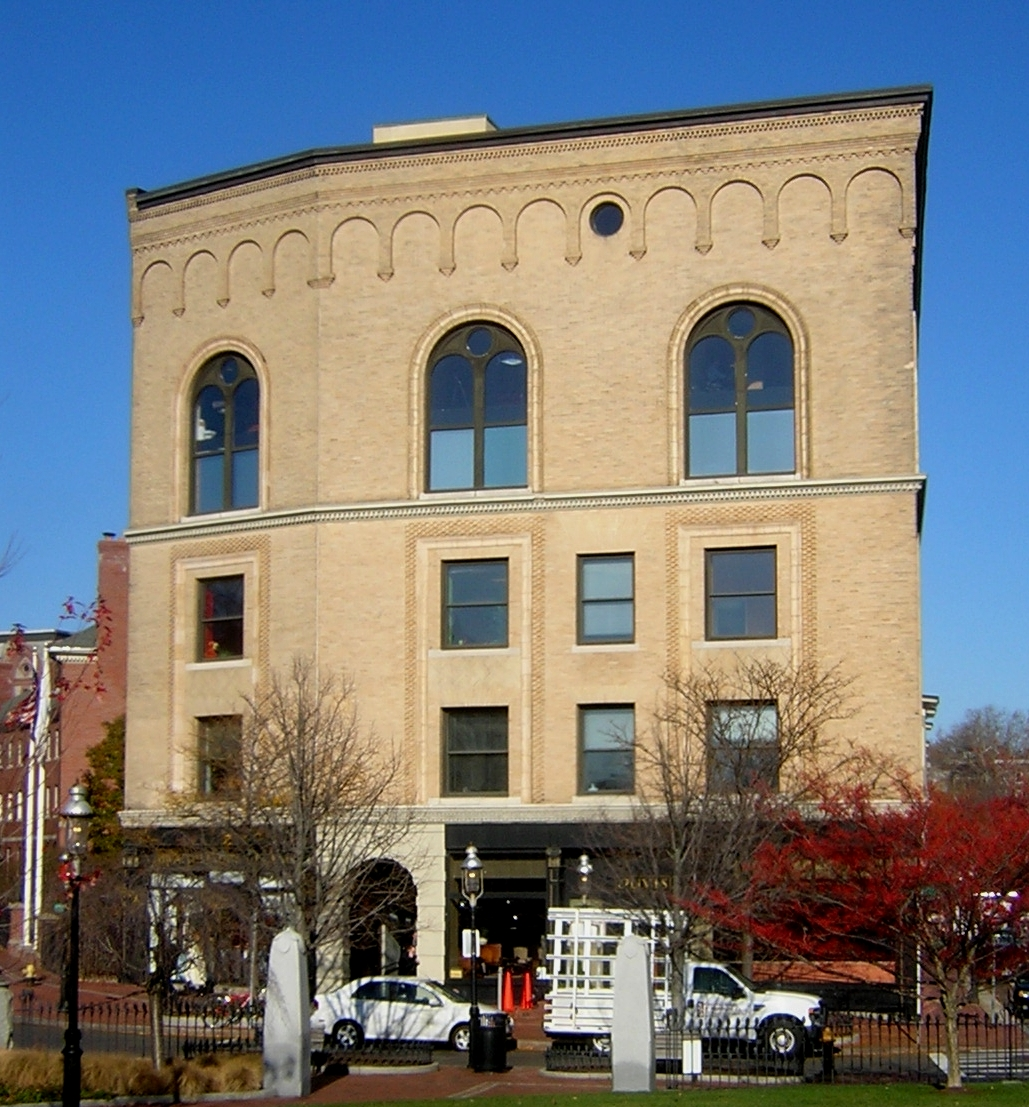
- AMC headquarters in Charlestown, MA
- Abbreviation: AMC
- Formation: 1876
- Founder: Edward Charles Pickering
- Type: Non-governmental organization
- Tax ID no.: 04-6001677
- Legal status: 501(c)(3) charitable organization
- Purpose: Environmental quality, protection, and beautification
- Headquarters: 10 City Square, Boston, Massachusetts
- Coordinates: 42.3723°N 71.0616°W
- Region served: Northeastern United States and Mid-Atlantic United States
- Services: Trails and Recreation Management, Outdoor Recreation and Survival Skills, Lodging and Campsites, Environmental Education
- Members: 310,000 members, advocates, and supporters (2026)
- President and CEO: Nicole Zussman
- Chair of the Board of Directors: Cheryl Duckworth
- Publication: Appalachia
- Subsidiaries: AMC Maine Woods Initiative, LLC; AMC Ore Mountain, LLC; AMC MW Funding, LLC; KI-Jo Mary, Inc. Environmental Insurance Agency, Inc.
- Revenue: ▲$51,955,587 (2022)
- Expenses: ▲$34,854,845 (2022)
- Endowment: ▼$87,548,042 (2022)
- Staff: ▲755 (2022)
- Volunteers: 5,000 (2022)
- Website: outdoors.org

The Appalachian Mountain Club (AMC) is the oldest outdoor group in the United States. Created in Boston in 1876 to explore and conserve New Hampshire's White Mountains, it now expands throughout the Northeastern United States with 11 chapters stretching from Maine to Virginia. In 2024 AMC reported 65,729 people connected to the outdoors through a mix of outdoor recreation, particularly hiking and backpacking, with a focus on environmental activism. Additional activities include cross-country skiing, whitewater and flatwater canoeing and kayaking, sea kayaking, sailing, rock climbing and bicycle riding. The club has about 4,400 volunteers, who lead roughly 5,000 trips and activities per year. The organization publishes a number of books, guides, and trail maps.

== History ==
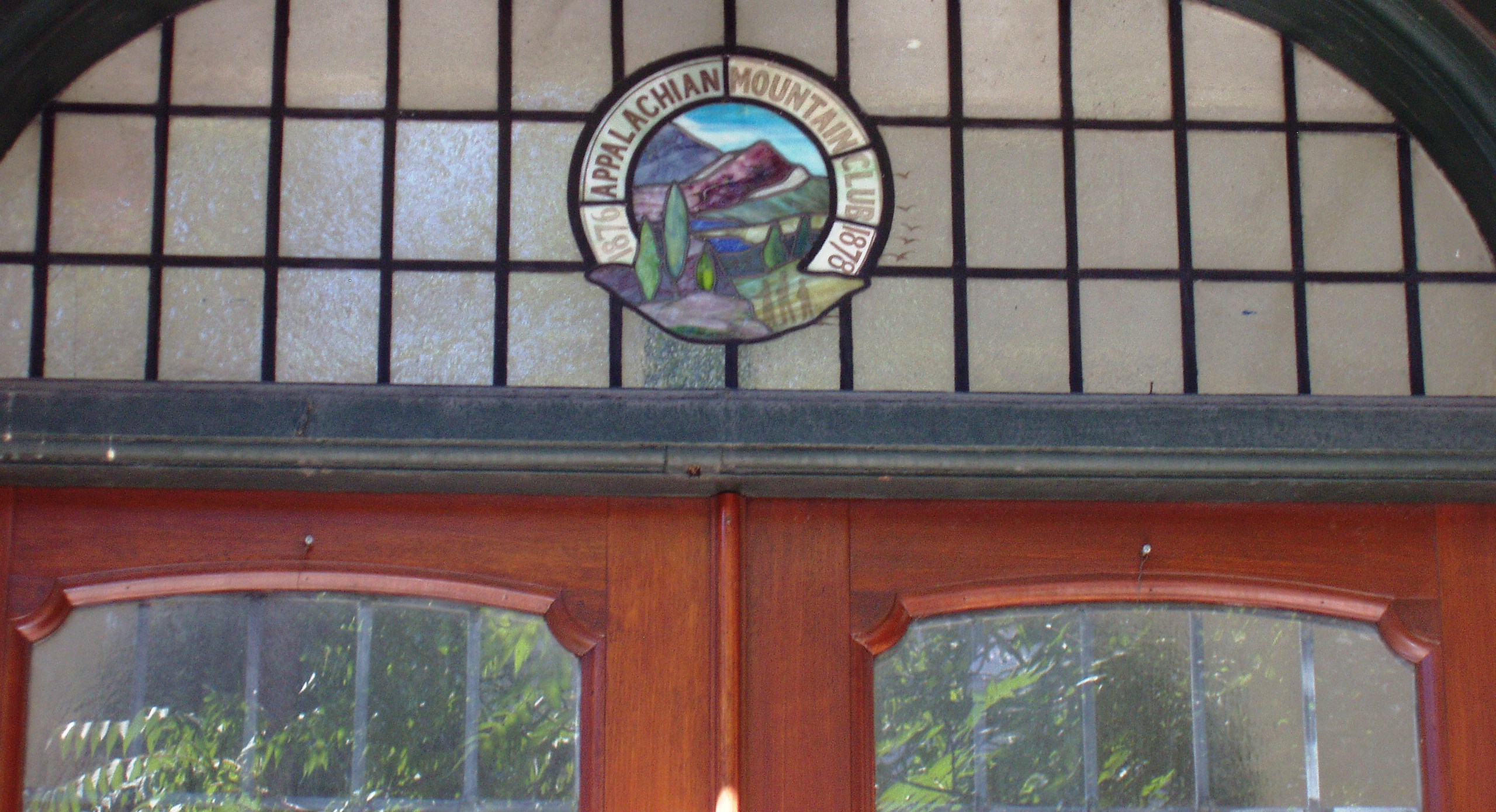
AMC's former headquarters at 5 Joy Street, Boston, Massachusetts.

Appalachian Mountain Club was organized in 1876, incorporated in 1878, and authorized by legislative act of 1894 to hold mountain and forest lands as historic sites. The club was formed by the efforts of Massachusetts Institute of Technology Professor Edward Charles Pickering who invited fellow Boston academics and vacationers to form a group interested in mountain exploration. The club aims to get more people outdoors and offer ways for members to protect the mountains, forests, waters, historic sites and critical landscapes they explore for future generations. The club collects scientific data concerning the mountains and surrounding landscapes which was key in passing the Clean Air Act and Clean Water Act. The group helped map the White Mountains and in 1888 built the first of eight High Huts in the range, modeled on Alpine shelters.

Though it's the oldest mountain club in America, the AMC was preceded by the Rocky Mountain Club (1875), White Mountain Club (1873), the Alpine Club of Williamstown (1863), and The Exploring Circle (1850). Each of these were short-lived organizations.

In 2003, Appalachian Mountain Club purchased 37,000 acres (15,000 ha) of land east of Moosehead Lake and southwest of Baxter State Park, along the 100-Mile Wilderness portion of the Appalachian Trail, as part of their Maine Woods Initiative. It has converted the Katahdin Iron Works portion of the purchase to a nature preserve, logged a portion, and runs a sporting camp called Little Lyford Pond camps about two miles (3 km) off the trail. The Club purchased an adjacent 4,300 acres (1,700 ha), including Baker Mountain, in 2015, and is considering purchasing more sporting camps in the vicinity.

In 2011, the Appalachian Mountain Club opened the newly built Gorman Chairback Lodge.

In September 2016, the Appalachian Mountain Club sold their Joy Street headquarters to a group of real estate investors for $15 million, who planned to turn the 22,000 square feet of office space on Beacon Hill into residential units. In December 2016, The Appalachian Mountain Club purchased Roughan Hall in the Charlestown neighborhood of Boston, and moved their headquarters there in September 2017.

In 2022, the AMC purchased another 27,000 acres (11,000 ha) adjacent to their previous holdings near the 100 Mile Wilderness, bringing the total to over 100,000 acres (40,000 ha) of contiguous land.

== Organization ==
Appalachian Mountain Club's headquarters is located in Roughan Hall at 10 City Square in the Charlestown neighborhood of Boston, with an adjunct facility at 6 Spice St.

Appalachian Mountain Club employed 755 individuals in 2022. AMC estimated that 5,000 individuals volunteered for the organization in 2022.

In 2022, the Appalachian Mountain Club earned over $14.7 million from its outdoor program centers, educational activities, membership dues, trail activities, and advertising. Sale of products netted over $1.2 million, rental income netted a loss of $0.6 million, investment income was over $2.2 million, and charitable contributions and grants received were almost $30.3 million.

Appalachian Mountain Club has eleven chapters located in the Northeast and Mid-Atlantic regions of the US. Chapters vary in geographical size and include Maine, New Hampshire, Boston, Southeastern Massachusetts, Worcester Massachusetts, Western Massachusetts, Connecticut, Narragansett (RI), New York-North Jersey, Delaware Valley which includes Southern NJ, Pennsylvania, and Delaware, and Potomac including Maryland, DC, and Virginia. The largest chapter is the Boston chapter, with over 30,000 members, followed by the New Hampshire chapter with over 12,000 members, and the New York-North Jersey chapter with over 10,000 members.

== Activities ==
=== The High Huts ===
Appalachian Mountain Club owns and maintains a series of eight mountain huts in the White Mountains. Modeled after similar shelters in the Alps, the various huts hold between 36 and 90 people. Hikers may reserve bunks for a fee; at most huts dinner and breakfast are included.

The huts' 30-year special use permits were renewed by the U.S. Forest Service in 1999 following a four-year process that included an environmental impact statement.

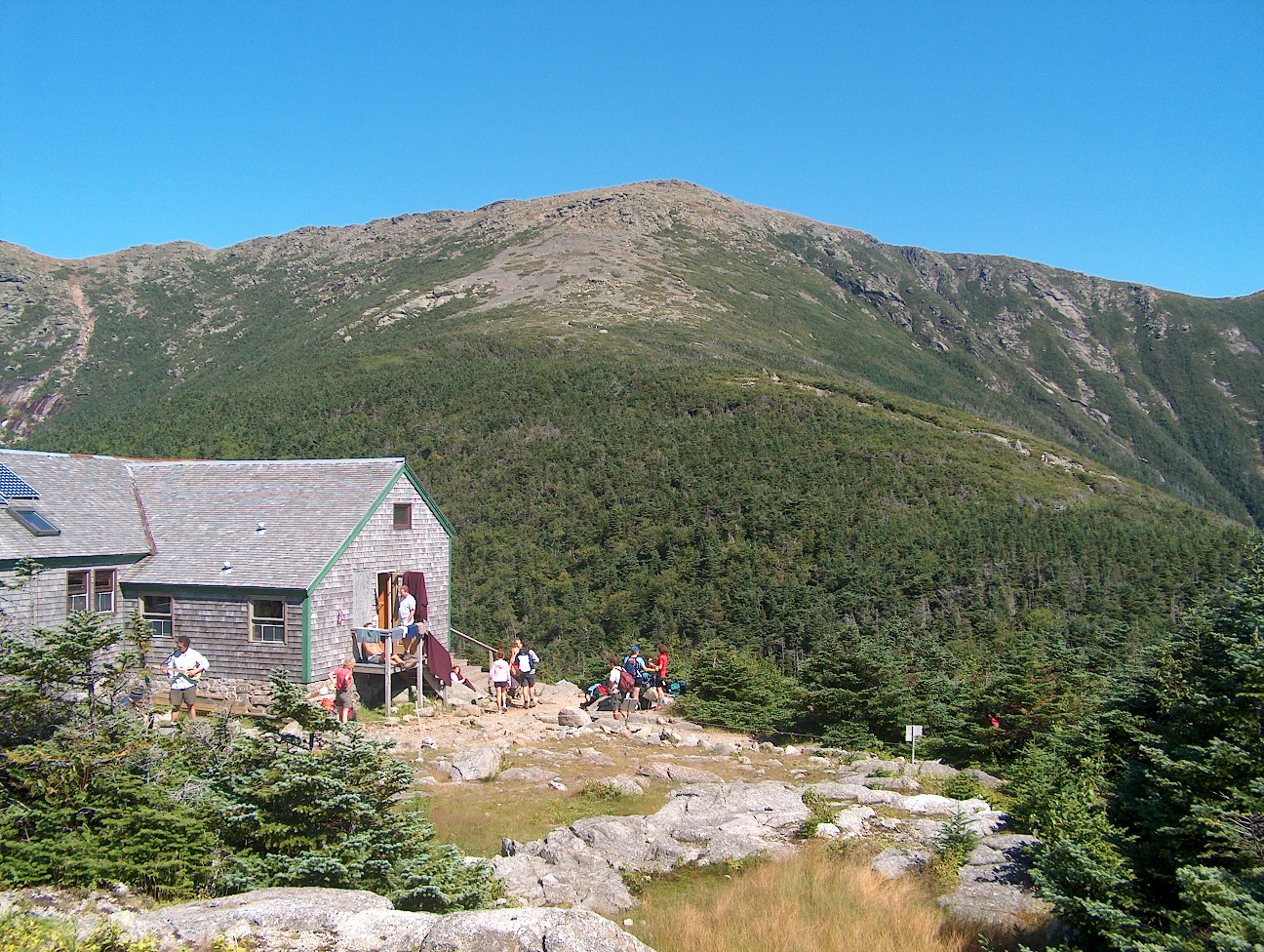
Greenleaf Hut

List of High Huts Owned and Operated by Appalachian Mountain Club
Hut Name	Location	Elevation (feet)
Lonesome Lake Hut	Franconia Notch State Park	2,775
Greenleaf Hut	Below the summit of Mount Lafayette	4,200
Galehead Hut	Between South Twin and Galehead Mountains	3,775
Zealand Falls Hut	In Zealand Notch	2,635
Mizpah Spring Hut	Between Mount Pierce and Mount Jackson	3,783
Lakes of the Clouds Hut	Below the summit of Mount Monroe	5,014
Madison Spring Hut	Between Mount Adams and Mount Madison	4,795
Carter Notch Hut	In Carter Notch	3,288

=== Campsites and shelters ===
The Appalachian Mountain Club also operates many campsites and shelters in the White Mountains, the Mahoosucs, and other New England locations. These campsites are often run by caretakers who manage waste, fees, and nearby trails. Nine of the highest use campsites have a $15 per person fee: Kinsman Pond, Liberty Spring, Garfield Ridge, 13 Falls, Guyot, Ethan Pond, Nauman, Imp, and Speck Pond.

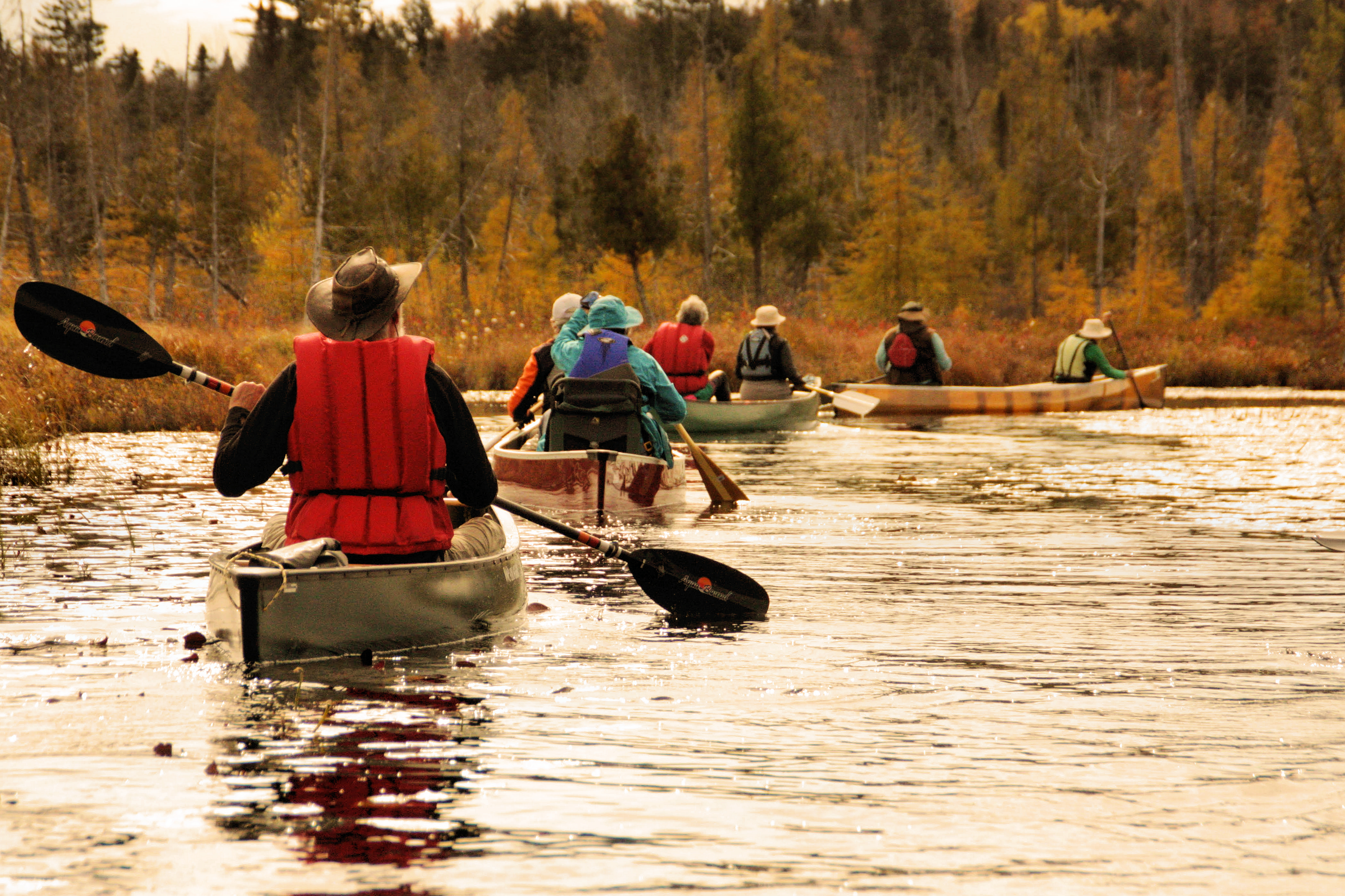
AMC Fall Foliage Trip in the Adirondacks

=== Activities ===
The majority of the AMC's activities are conducted by its members who volunteer to lead trips throughout the northeast, from Maine to DC. Activities include hiking, backpacking, paddling, biking, rock climbing, camping, skiing, and snowshoeing, ranging in duration from a day to a week. Additional long-duration domestic and international trips are conducted through the AMC's Adventure Travel program.

=== Trails ===
The club also operates several trails operations. The Volunteer for Trails program brings teens and adults on day to week long programs teaching trail building and maintenance techniques based out of Camp Dodge in Pinkham Notch. The Roving Conservation Crew is a small crew which works on both backcountry and front country projects around New England. The White Mountain Professional Trail Crew focuses on trail projects within the White Mountains, and the Maine Woods Professional Crew focuses on projects in Maine.

=== The Four Thousand Footer Club ===
A committee of Appalachian Mountain Club administers the Four Thousand Footer Club. Anyone who has climbed to and from each of the 48 New Hampshire Four-thousand footers is eligible to apply for membership to the club. Members are given a patch and new inductees are invited to attend a yearly celebration dinner. The Four Thousand Footer Club also recognizes individuals who complete the New England Four Thousand Footers (of which there are 67) and the New England Hundred Highest.

=== Publications ===
Appalachia, the club journal, has been published since 1876. Books relating to subjects such as mountaineering and touring trips are published under the auspices of the society.

== National Register of Historic Places ==
The club's Ponkapoag Camp is listed on the National Register of Historic Places.

== See also ==
- Appalachian Trail Conservancy
- Crawford Notch
- Little Lyford
- Mount Cardigan
- Pinkham Notch
- Three Mile Island
