= Penquis Valley High School =

Location
- 48 Penquis Drive; Milo, Maine 04463; United States
- Coordinates: 45°15′5″N 68°59′45″W

Information
- School district: MSAD 41
- Principal: Katie Joyner-Robertson & Danielle Libbey
- Teaching staff: 33.50 (FTE)
- Grades: 5-12
- Enrollment: 372 (2022-2023)
- Student to teacher ratio: 11.10
- Colors: Blue, white, red
- Mascot: Patriot
- Accreditation: New England Association of Schools and Colleges
- Website: www.msad41.us/o/pvmhs

Penquis Valley High School is a high school located in Milo, Maine, United States. Founded in 1968 (combining Brownville and Milo High Schools), the school serves students from Milo, Brownville, LaGrange, and Medford and Orneville Township. Katie Joyner-Robertson and Danielle Libbey are the Co-Principals. The school is accredited by NEASC.

== Athletics ==
The school's mascot is a patriot and has uniforms with a blue, red, and white color schemes. Penquis has varsity sports teams in soccer, baseball/softball, track, basketball and cheering. The soccer team has experienced much success in the last few years. Athletic Director and former Coach Jason Mills has made an incredible impact on the soccer program at Penquis Valley High School, leading them to the playoffs in the last 5 straight years. Also, the baseball team fought hard for a playoff victory against Foxcroft Academy in the play-in round of the 2014 baseball season. The basketball team has won the Class C State Championship twice. Once in March 2000, with an upset against Boothbay 58–45, and again in March 2013, against Boothbay with a score of 61–54.

== Notable teachers ==
Nelson Madore, former mayor of Waterville, Maine and Professor at Thomas College, taught at PVHS from 1967 to 1969.
