= Jo-Mary Lakes =

Group of lakes in Maine, United States

Upper Jo-Mary Lake
- Location within Maine Location within the United States
- Coordinates: 45°36′N 68°58′W
- Max. length: 3 mi (4.8 km)
- Max. width: 1.5 mi (2.4 km)
- Surface area: 1,847 acres (747 ha)
- Max. depth: 72 feet (22 m)
- Water volume: 58,496 acre⋅ft (72,154,000 m^{3})
- Surface elevation: 525 ft (160 m)

Middle Jo-Mary Lake
- Location within Maine Location within the United States
- Coordinates: 45°39′N 68°57′W
- Max. length: 2 mi (3.2 km)
- Max. width: 1.3 mi (2.1 km)
- Surface area: 1,147 acres (464 ha)
- Max. depth: 18 feet (5.5 m)
- Water volume: 6,973 acre⋅ft (8,601,000 m^{3})
- Surface elevation: 494 ft (151 m)

Lower Jo-Mary Lake
- Location within Maine Location within the United States
- Coordinates: 45°41′N 69°00′W
- Max. length: 4.5 mi (7.2 km)
- Max. width: 1 mi (1.6 km)
- Surface area: 1,889 acres (764 ha)
- Max. depth: 64 ft (20 m)
- Water volume: 35,584 acre⋅ft (43,892,000 m^{3})
- Surface elevation: 493 ft (150 m)

A chain of three Jo-Mary Lakes along the border of Penobscot County and Piscataquis County drain into the Pemadumcook Chain of Lakes in the North Maine Woods. The flow sequence is from Upper Jo-Mary Lake into Middle Jo-Mary Lake and then through Lower Jo-Mary Lake into Pemadumcook Lake.

== Upper Jo-Mary Lake ==
The upper lake has approximately the same surface area as the lower lake, but holds a larger volume of water. Johnston Brook drains Johnston Pond and Jo-Mary Pond into the west side of the lake; and Duck Brook drains Duck Pond into the north end of the lake. Upper Jo-Mary Stream drains from the eastern side of the upper lake into Turkey Tail Lake 1 mile (1.6 km) to the northeast. The upper lake has a native population of lake trout, and has been stocked with brook trout and land-locked Atlantic salmon. Rainbow smelt and white perch have been introduced to the lake.

== Middle Jo-Mary Lake ==
The middle lake is the smallest of the three, although connected with Turkey Tail Lake to the southeast at the same level through two narrow necks on either side of a large island. Upper Jo-Mary Stream flows from the upper lake into Turkey Tail Lake. The northern end of the middle lake flows through a narrow neck into the southeastern corner of the lower lake at the same level. The shallow water of the middle lake becomes too warm for trout during the summer months, but the lake supports a population of chain pickerel and white perch.

== Lower Jo-Mary Lake ==
In addition to drainage from the upper and middle lakes to the south, the lower lake receives drainage from the west through the Cooper Brook Deadwater. Leavitt Pond, Henderson Pond, and Mud Pond drain to the deadwater through Mud Brook; while Rocky Pond, Crawford Pond, Church Pond, and Cooper Pond drain through Cooper Brook. The Appalachian Trail follows Cooper Brook from Crawford Pond to the deadwater and thence follows the shoreline along the western end of the lower lake. The northeast corner of the lower lake overflows into the south side of Pemadumcook Lake only a few hundred yards (or metres) to the north. Native populations of lake trout, brook trout, and land-locked Atlantic salmon receive comparatively light angling pressure because there is no motor vehicle road to the lower lake.
