= Roughan Hall =

- U.S. National Register of Historic Places
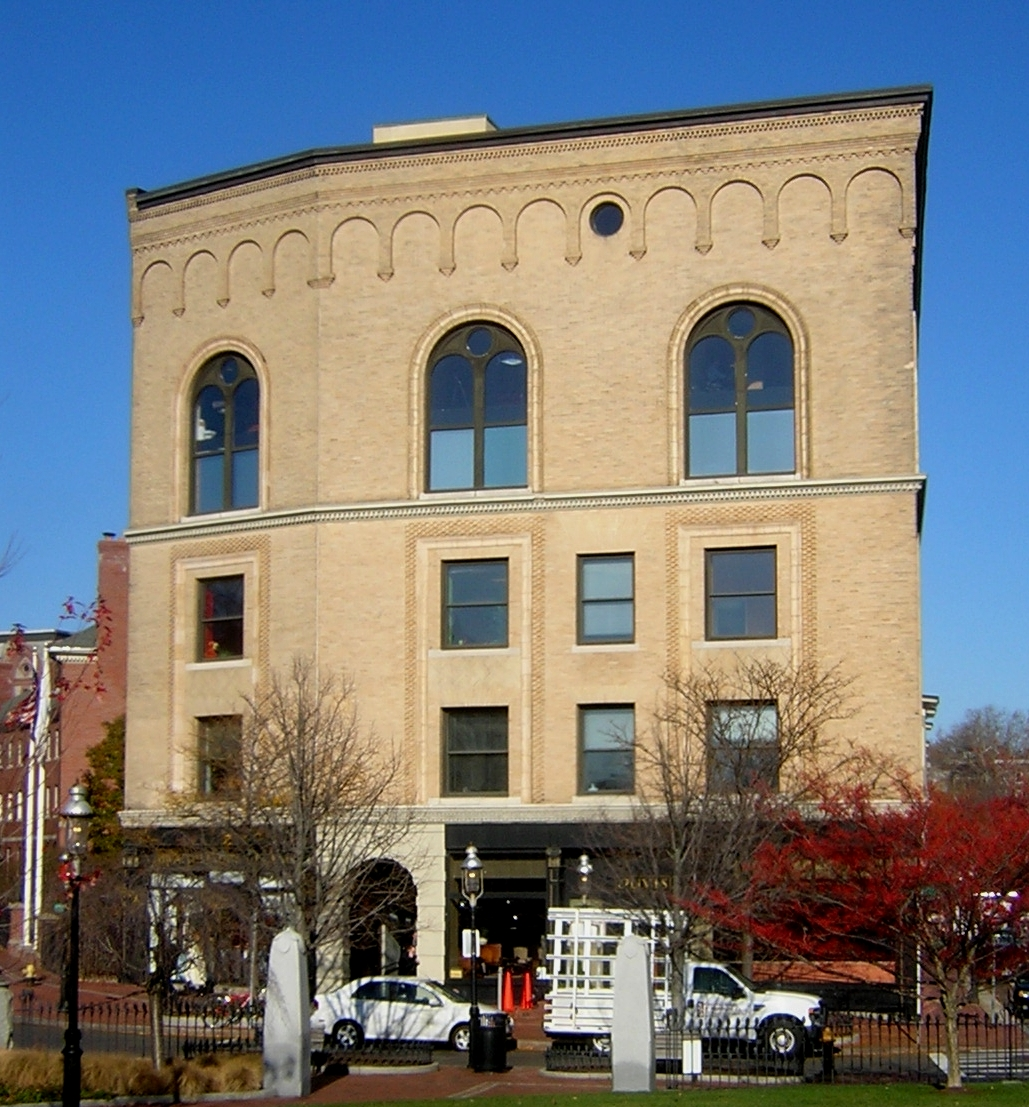

- Location within Boston Location within Massachusetts Location within the United States
- Location: 10 City Sq., Charlestown, Boston, Massachusetts
- Coordinates: 42°22′20.1″N 71°3′42.1″W
- Area: 1.4 acres (0.57 ha)
- Built: 1892
- Built by: Donovan & Brock
- Architect: Arthur H. Vinal
- Architectural style: Renaissance, Romanesque
- NRHP reference No.: 82004448
- Added to NRHP: April 15, 1982

Roughan Hall is a historic commercial building at 10 City Square, the historic central square of the Charlestown neighborhood of Boston, Massachusetts. Built in 1892 and enlarged in 1896, it is the square's only surviving 19th-century commercial building, and a distinctive example of Romanesque and Renaissance Revival architecture. Its upper levels now serve as the headquarters of the Appalachian Mountain Club. The building was listed on the National Register of Historic Places in 1982.

== Description and history ==
City Square is a public park at the southern end of the Charlestown peninsula, lined on the southwest and southeast by major traffic arteries. Roughan Hall is located on the park's northeast side, between Main and Park Streets. It is a four-story yellow brick building, with cast-iron storefronts on the ground level, and a limestone-framed entry to the upper floors, which historically housed offices and a large auditorium. The main facade is four bays wide, with the leftmost bay set at a slight angle, owing in part to an odd lot shape. The second and third floor windows of three of the bays are surrounded by decorative brickwork, and the fourth-floor windows are tall rounded arches with terra cotta surrounds. The building cornice includes a series of blind arches surmounted by brick corbelling.

The building was designed by Arthur H. Vinal and built in 1892 for Michael Roughan, a prominent local businessman and philanthropist. At the time, the square was completely encircled by commercial and civic buildings. The building housed Roughan's liquor store on the ground floor, and the top-floor hall was used primarily by social and fraternal organizations. In 1989, the ground floor space was converted for use as a restaurant and housed Todd English's Olives from 1989 to 2013, which was replaced by Legal Oysteria in 2014.

The building was purchased by the Appalachian Mountain Club in 2016, which occupies its upper floors as of September 2017.

== See also ==
- National Register of Historic Places listings in northern Boston, Massachusetts
