= Hundred-Mile Wilderness =

Section of the Appalachian Trail in Maine, US

Coordinates: 45°36.9′N 69°9.8′W

Hundred Mile Wilderness
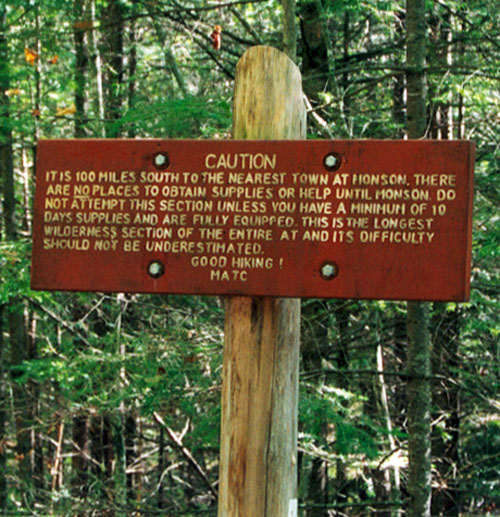
- Warning sign near Abol Bridge, the northern terminus of the Hundred Mile Wilderness
- Trailheads: Route 15 north of Monson, Abol Bridge on the Golden Road
- Highest point: 3,654 ft (1,114 m), White Cap Mountain
- Lowest point: 493 ft (150 m), Lower Jo-Mary Lake
- Sights: Alpine tundra, Barren Mountain Ledges, Glacial erratics, Gulf Hagas, Nahmakanta Lake, Old-growth forests, Rocky outcrops, Rivers, Little Wilson Falls, Wetland, Wildlife, Valleys
- Hazards: Severe weather Mosquitos; Yellowjackets; Biting flies Steep grades Dangerous fordings Diarrhea from water Poison ivy

Trail map
- Map

The Hundred-Mile Wilderness is a section of the Appalachian Trail in the state of Maine running between Monson and Abol Bridge over the West Branch of the Penobscot River just south of Baxter State Park. It is generally considered the most remote section of the Appalachian Trail, and one of the most challenging to navigate and traverse. This section of the trail is crossed by several logging roads and is maintained by the Maine Appalachian Trail Club. It consists of a small corridor of protected wilderness surrounded by large tracts of public and private land controlled by paper companies. An increasing amount of the adjoining lands are being protected by groups like the Appalachian Mountain Club and the Nature Conservancy.

In 2000, a series of new logging roads and a marked side-trail offered hikers re-supply and lodging opportunities between miles 55 and 65 heading northbound from Monson.

== See also ==
- Maine Island Trail
- 100 Mile Wilderness Adventures
