= West Branch Pleasant River (Piscataquis River tributary) =

Location
- Country: United States

Physical characteristics
- Source
  - location: Maine
  - elevation: 1,460 feet (450 m)
- Mouth
  - location: Pleasant River
  - coordinates: 45°21′55″N 69°03′12″W
  - elevation: 350 feet (110 m)

Basin features
- Progression: Pleasant River – Piscataquis River – Penobscot River

The West Branch Pleasant River is a 36.1-mile-long (58.1 km) tributary of the Piscataquis River in Piscataquis County, Maine. From a location north of Fourth West Branch Pond (45°36′32″N 69°16′08″W) in Shawtown (Township A, Range 12, WELS), the river runs about 18 miles (29 km) counterclockwise around the White Cap Mountain massif, then about 18 miles (29 km) southeast to its confluence with the East Branch of the Pleasant River in Brownville.

The Appalachian Trail crosses the West Branch (45°28′44″N 69°17′19″W) at The Hermitage Preserve in Bowdoin College Grant East (T.7 R.10 NWP). The Hermitage contains a roughly 35-acre (14 ha) grove — one of the few stands of old-growth Eastern White Pine remaining in New England. Just upstream from The Hermitage is Gulf Hagas (45°29′10″N 69°19′34″W), a 2.5-mile-long (4.0 km) water-formed canyon. The river falls 500 feet (150 m) in the canyon, including multiple waterfalls. Gulf Hagas and The Hermitage are among the 14 National Natural Landmarks in Maine, designated in 1968 and 1979 respectively.

== See also ==
- List of rivers of Maine
- Katahdin Iron Works
