= East Branch Pleasant River (Piscataquis River tributary) =

Location
- Country: United States

Physical characteristics
- Source
  - location: Maine
  - elevation: 1,370 feet (420 m)
- Mouth
  - location: Pleasant River
  - coordinates: 45°21′56″N 69°03′10″W
  - elevation: 350 feet (110 m)
- Length: 32 mi (51 km)

Basin features
- Progression: Pleasant River – Piscataquis River – Penobscot River

The East Branch Pleasant River is a 32.4-mile-long (52.1 km) tributary of the Piscataquis River in Piscataquis County, Maine. From its source (45°37′40″N 69°13′30″W) in Shawtown (Township A, Range 12, WELS), the river runs about 19 miles (31 km) generally southeast to Upper Ebeemee Lake, then about 13 miles (21 km) south through Ebeemee Lake to its confluence with the West Branch to form the Pleasant River in Brownville.

The Appalachian Trail crosses the East Branch in T.A R.11 WELS (45°35′48″N 69°11′37″W).

== See also ==
- List of rivers of Maine
