= Gulf Hagas =

Gorge in Maine, United States

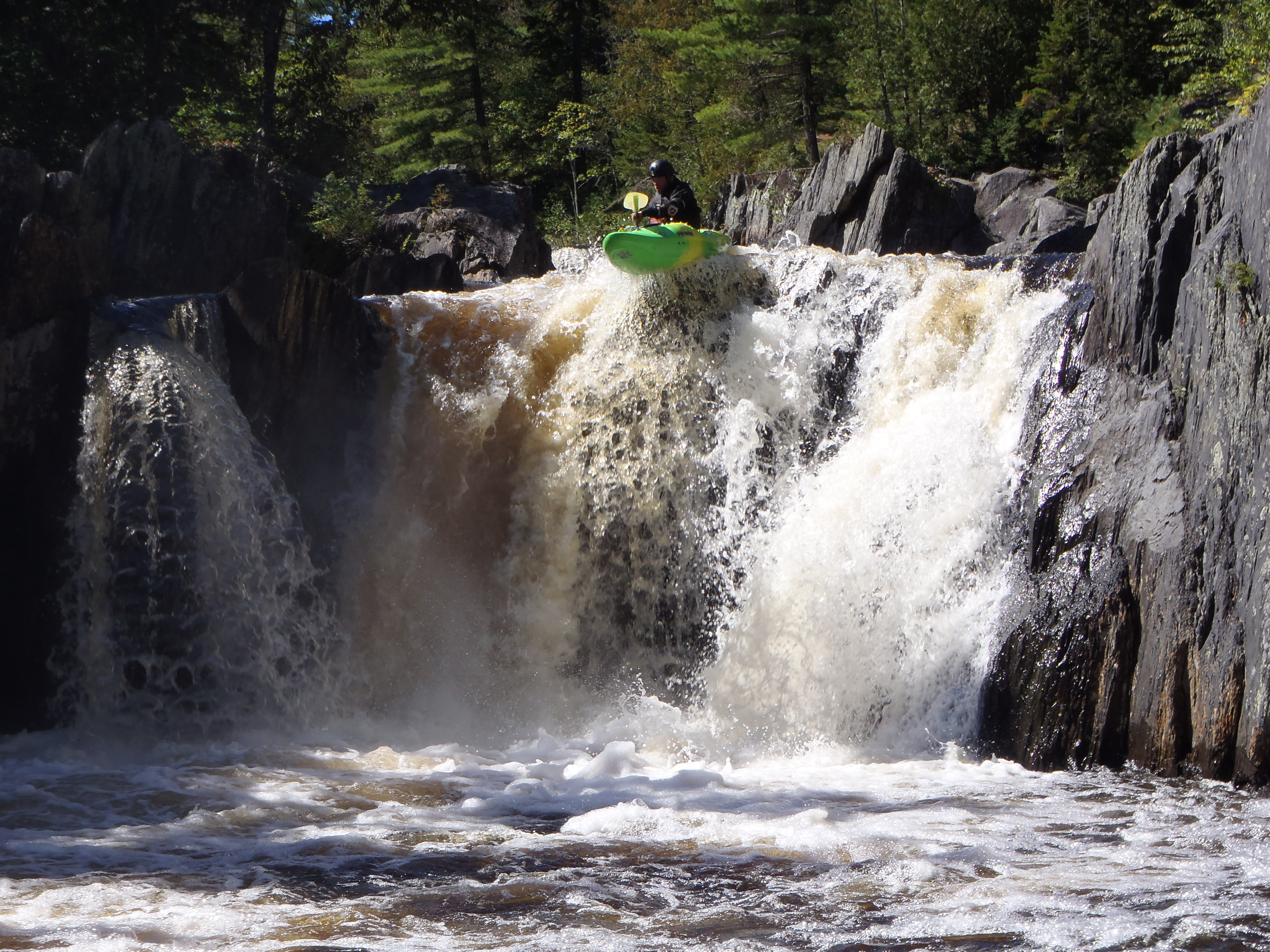
- A kayaker runs "Billings Falls" in Gulf Hagas.

- Location within Maine
- Location: Northern maine
- Coordinates: 45.4841°N 69.323°W
- Established: 1985

U.S. National Natural Landmark
- Designated: 1968

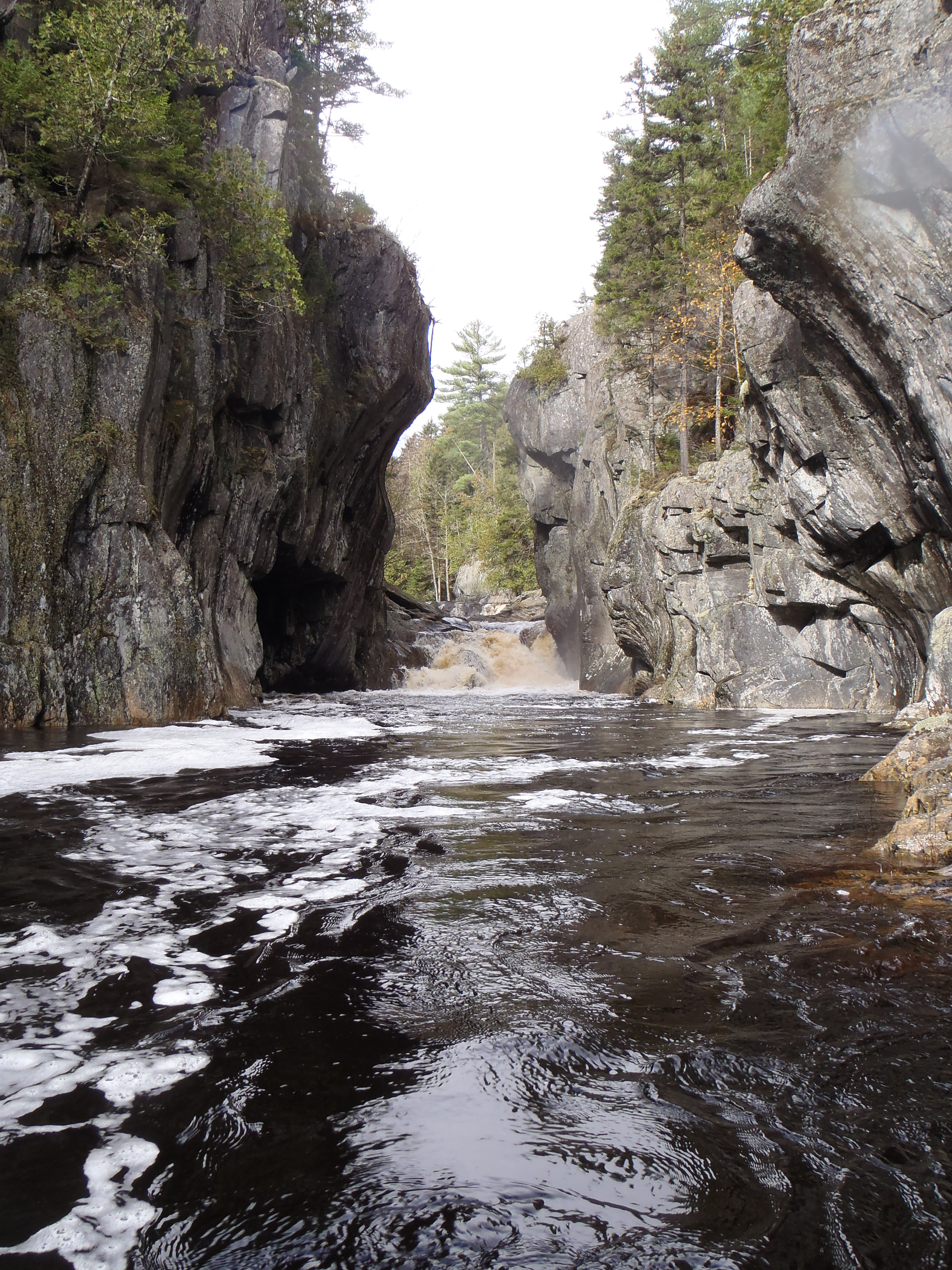
A view of Gulf Hagas from river level.

Gulf Hagas is a gorge located in the mountains of northern Maine woods and is often referred to as the Grand Canyon of Maine. The West Branch of the Pleasant River cuts through the earth for three miles creating a vertically walled slate gorge with numerous waterfalls. A trail follows the rim of the canyon offering hikers views of the falls and its geology. The gorge is 3 miles (4.8 km) long; the river drops 370 feet (110 m) in this distance boasting 130 feet (40 m) walls. Gulf Hagas is one of 14 National Natural Landmarks in the State of Maine, and is open to the public for a fee during the regular season.

== Where ==
Gulf Hagas is part of the Appalachian Trail (AT) Corridor. For a short distance the Gulf Hagas Rim Trail follows the AT, a 2,200 miles (3,500 km) hiking trail extending from Georgia to Maine. The section of the AT which goes through Gulf Hagas is called the Hundred-Mile Wilderness. This is the final 100 miles (160 km) of the AT and is viewed by many as the most remote and difficult portion.

Most people access Gulf Hagas by driving through Katahdin Iron Works, a State Park and historic site where iron ore was once smelted. Gulf Hagas is 90 miles (140 km), 1 hour and 20 minute drive from Bangor, Maine. From Portland, Maine the drive is a 3 hour and 40 minute, 172 miles (277 km) trip.

== History ==
Logs were once driven through the gorge to provide fuel for the smelting operations which took place at Katahdin Iron Works. Later, pulp wood used to make paper was floated through the Gulf. A few spots within the gorge were as narrow as 8 feet (2.4 m) and were referred to as the Jaws. These spots caused log jams and were widened by the log drivers using dynamite. Log drivers are responsible for naming most of the major waterfalls and rapids in Gulf Hagas. The Gulf was previously owned by the paper companies, Great Northern Paper Company and Sappi.

Gulf Hagas was designated a National Natural Scenic Landmark in 1969 and landowners agreed to preserve 500 acres (200 ha) of land including Gulf Hagas. Gulf Hagas became part of Appalachian Trail Corridor, owned by the National Park Service, in 1985. The Maine Appalachian Trail Club, consisting of mostly volunteers, maintains the Gulf's system of trails.

== Geology and geography ==
The bedrock which forms Gulf Hagas is slate, part of the Carrabassett formation. 400 million years ago converging plates forced land upward, displacing the Iapetus Ocean. Mud deposits remained, which were heated, compressed, and crystallized to form slate. Slate has sharp, angular edges when it fractures but is polished smooth by the action of erosion. This is evident deep in the canyon where the gorge walls are smooth and vertical. The swirling motion of water and pebbles creates potholes in the gorge, spherical depressions in the rock. Gulf Hagas may have been created towards the end of the last ice age when an ice-dammed lake gave way and sent huge volumes of water through the area, carving the Gulf.

== Flora and fauna ==
The Gulf Hagas Rim Trail passes through The Hermitage, one of the few remaining stands of virgin old growth forest in New England. Giant eastern white pine trees adorn this area and can be seen as tall as 150 feet (46 m), with diameters sometimes spanning 10 feet (3.0 m). The rim trail is characterized by pine trees. Black spruce, eastern hemlock, balsam fir and eastern white pine trees are the most common. Moose are frequently seen in the area along with white-tailed deer and snowshoe hare. Within the gorge, Brook Trout are abundant.

== Myth and lore ==
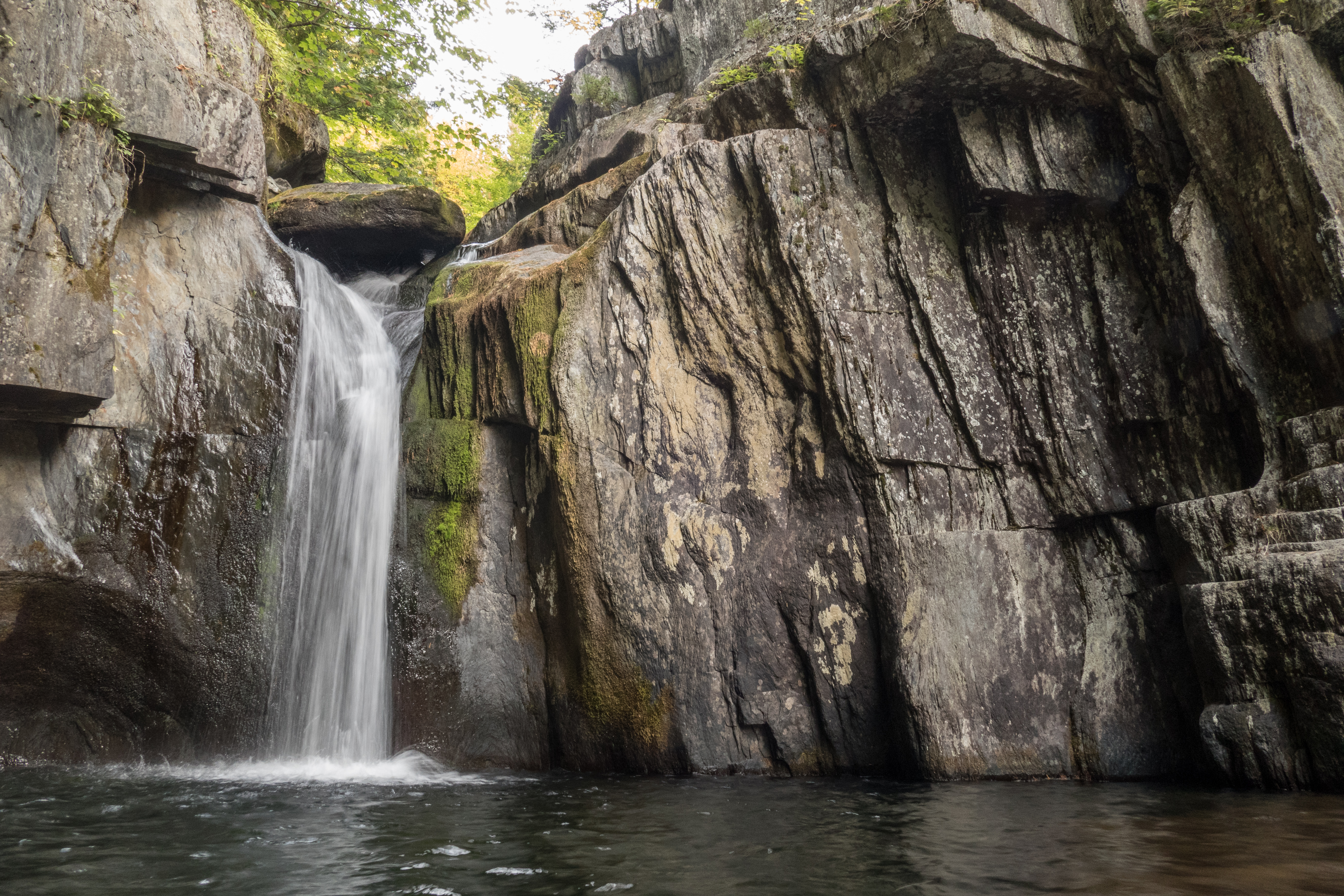
Pool level view at Screw Auger Falls in Gulf Hagas, Maine.

Native Americans certainly lived, hunted, and fished around Gulf Hagas. Gravesites belonging to the mysterious "Red Paint People" have been found in the area. Red ochre, an impure form of iron ore readily available in the area was used by the Red Paint People on their tools, skin and during burials. Grave sites were lined with the red ochre which preserved bodies of the deceased. Burial grounds belonging to Red Paint People have been discovered dating back 7,500 years.

Simon Garew, the Legend of the Gulf, would travel to the gorge with his dog each year to hunt and fish. His secret reason for visiting the gorge is described in a poem; here is an excerpt from Simon Garfew A Legend of Gulf Glen:

"The Great Spirit comes to the face in the rock,
The moon when the leaves grow red;
And when the round moon shines upon it,
Shines into the Gulf at night,
Shines full and fair upon it, Making it plain and white, -
Whoever waits there, with fasting,
Below the strong face,
With a deer's blood for offering
Always finds pardon and peace."

Simon ventured into the canyon one fall and was never seen again after a storm filled the gorge with water. All that was left was his dog who wouldn't leave the Gulf without him.

== Hiking ==
Hiking along the Gulf Hagas Rim Trail is the most popular option for hikers who wish to view the gorge. Hikers should be well prepared and get an early start; the hike is 8 miles (13 km) long and takes up to 8 hours. Those seeking a more moderate hike may consider visiting The Hermitage and Gulf Hagas Brook, which is a 4 miles (6.4 km) round trip. There is no camping allowed in Gulf Hagas, but camping is available nearby provided by KI Jo-Mary. Fires are not allowed in Gulf Hagas. Water can occasionally be found along the Rim Trail but should be treated for contaminants before consumption. Anything brought into Gulf Hagas should be brought out; this a primitive area, there are no trash disposal services. Black-flies and mosquitoes can be thick in the spring and summer months. Insect repellent and long-sleeved clothing is advised. The weather in Maine can change quickly and hikers should be prepared for any type of weather.

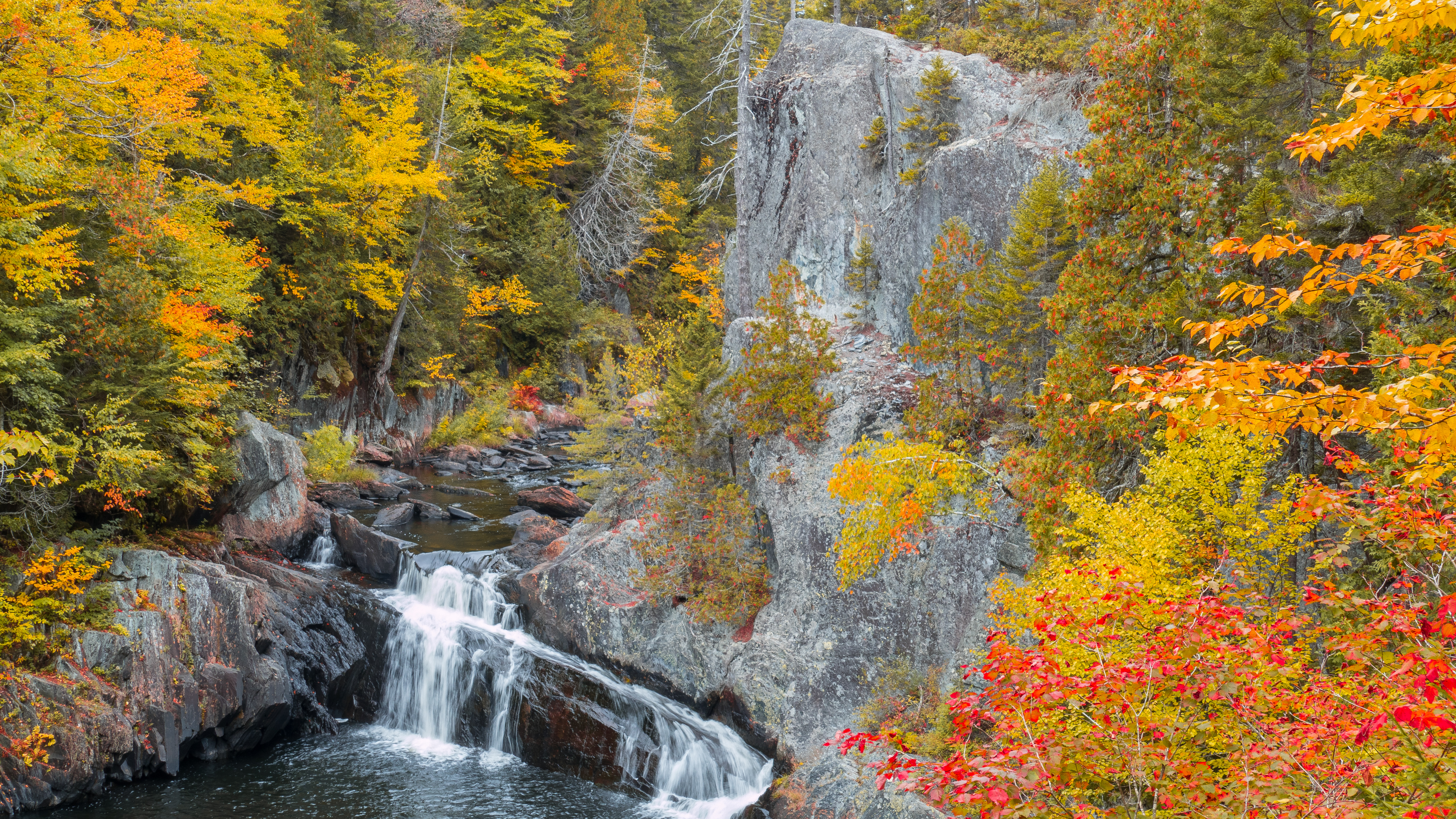
Fall foliage overlooking Buttermilk Falls in Gulf Hagas on an overcast October day in 2016.

=== Hiking directions ===
Follow signs from the parking lot to the trail-head to begin the hike. You will immediately come to the West Branch of the Pleasant River. There is no bridge and the river must be forded. The river is usually low and easily crossed during summer months. High water in the spring time or after a rain storm, however, may make the crossing difficult. If the river is unsafe to cross an option is to drive 6 miles (9.7 km) up Katahdin Iron Works Road and hike in from the Head of the Gulf, which crosses the river with a bridge.

The trail converges with the Appalachian Trail (AT) just before crossing the river. Follow the trail about a tenth of a mile to where it splits, stay left and enter the Hermitage, an old-growth virgin forest of White Pine trees. After a mile of easy walking, the Rim Trail Loop is reached. The Appalachian Trail goes off to the right, another trail goes straight ahead. This is the Tote Road; most people hike back on this trail since the walking is easier than the Rim Trail. Stay left to follow the Gulf Hagas Rim Trail, which immediately crosses scenic Gulf Hagas Brook, eventually reaching the gorge. The Rim trail has numerous overlooks providing views of falls and rapids below. Some include Jaws, Buttermilk Falls, and Billings Falls. The 20-foot (6.1 m) high Billings Falls is a highlight of the hike, and at this point you're nearing the return on the Tote Road. Once the Tote Road is reached take a right and stay on this trail until the AT is reached. This completes the 5 miles (8.0 km) loop. Return along the same trail, via the Hermitage.

== Kayaking ==
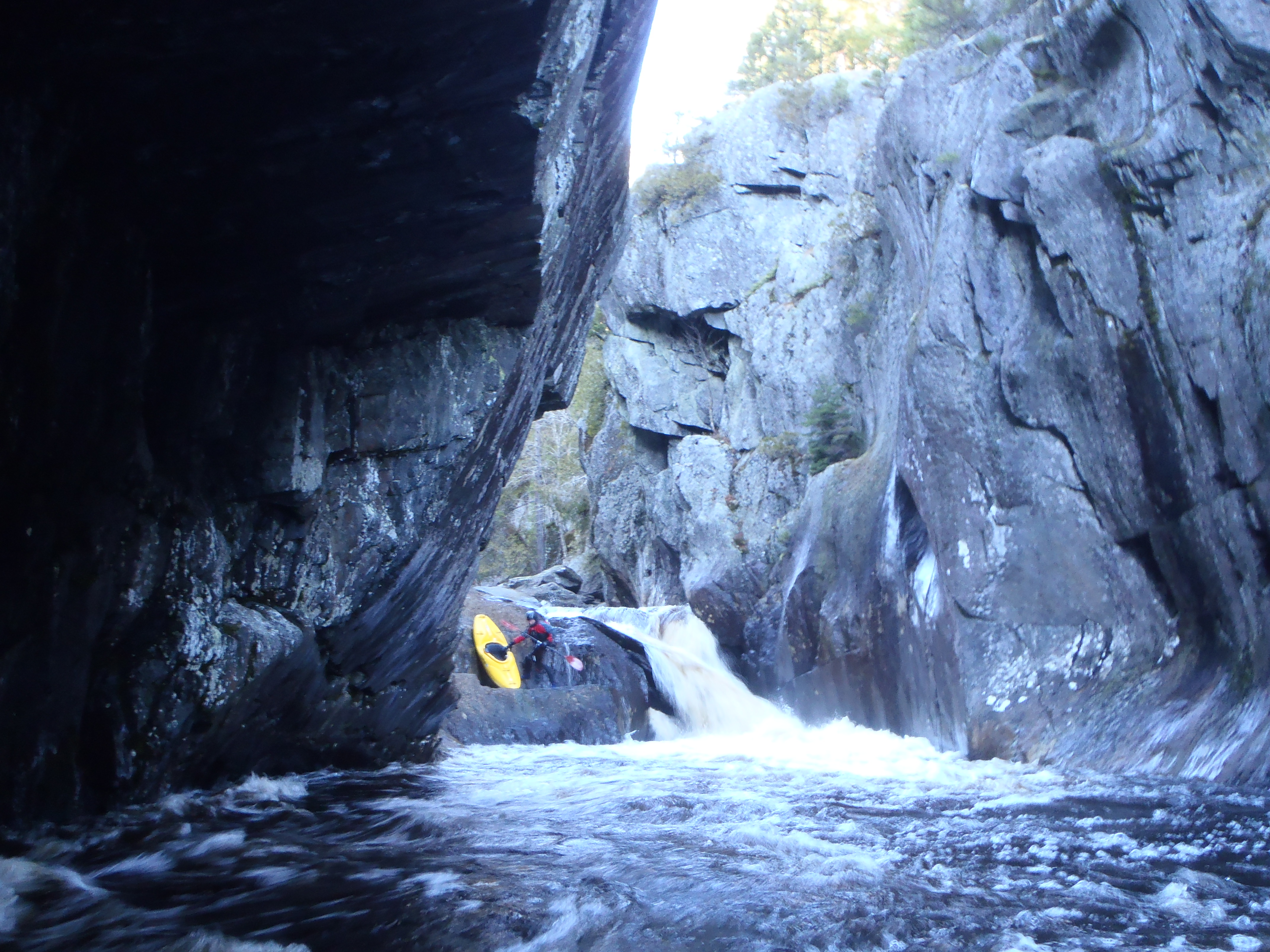
A kayaker portaging the rapid "Wedge"

Kayaking Gulf Hagas is best suited for expert, class five, whitewater kayakers. The steep gorge walls can make egress nearly impossible. Gulf Hagas is considered by many to be the best creek run in Maine. The whitewater is unique and of particularly high quality; the deep gorge and waterfalls aren't especially common in Maine. Great scenery, a wide range of boatable flows, waterfalls, and water levels which remain high longer than other runs make Gulf Hagas a classic class 5 kayak run.

== Other recreation ==
Hunting is allowed in KI Jo-Mary, but not along the trails in Gulf Hagas. Fishing is allowed per Maine State law. ATVs are not permitted in KI Jo-Mary.

== Getting there ==
Roads accessing Gulf Hagas are on private land and are managed by a group of private landowners called KI Jo-Mary. KI Jo-Mary collects fees to help maintain roads and facilities. The Gate fee is $11 for Maine residents and $22 for non-Maine residents. The gate is open from 6 AM until 9 PM. The gatehouse is open May through October, during the off-season no fees are collected and the gate remains open. Camping is also available for a fee.

If you're driving from the south, once Brownville is reached, continue following route 11 north for 8.1 miles (13.0 km). Take a slight left onto the (dirt) Katahdin Iron Works Road, and drive for 6.5 miles (10.5 km) until the gatehouse is reached. Stop here and pay the fee. Cross the West Pleasant River via bridge and take an immediate right. Stay left at 3 intersections driving 6.5 miles (10.5 km). There will be a parking on the right where the trailhead is located. If coming from the north, from Greenville, follow Pleasant Street for half a mile onto E Road. Travel on E Road for 3.6 miles (5.8 km) which turns into Ki Road. Follow Ki Road for 8 miles (13 km). Take a right on Katahdin Iron Works road and drive 6.1 miles (9.8 km) until the trailhead is reached. Gate fees will also be collected if coming from Greenville.
