= Brownville, Maine =

Town in Maine, United States

- Town
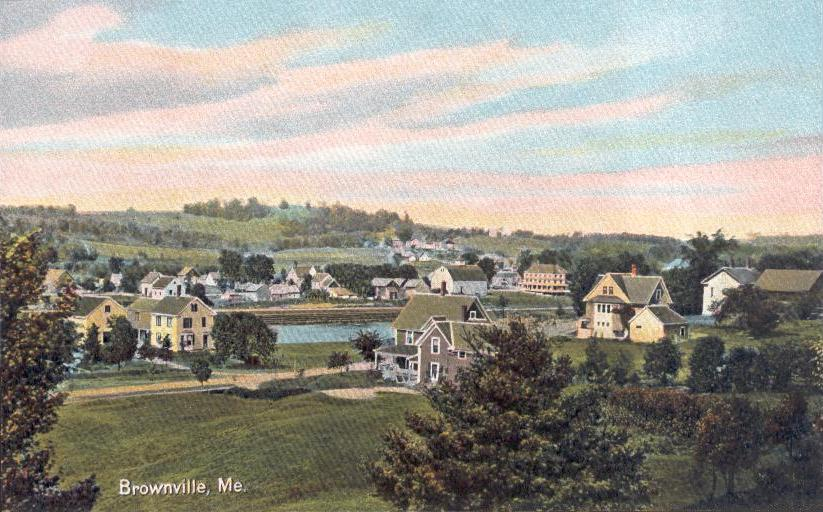
- General view c. 1910

- Logo

- Location in Piscataquis County and the state of Maine

- Location in the United States
- Coordinates: 45°20′42″N 69°2′10″W
- Country: United States
- State: Maine
- County: Piscataquis
- Incorporated: 1824
- Communities: Brownville; Brownville Junction; Knights Landing

Government
  - Type: Board of Selectmen

Area
  - Total: 44.62 sq mi (115.57 km^{2})
  - Land: 44.03 sq mi (114.04 km^{2})
  - Water: 0.59 sq mi (1.53 km^{2})
- Elevation: 781 ft (238 m)

Population (2020)
  - Total: 1,139
  - Density: 26/sq mi (10/km^{2})
- Time zone: UTC-5 (Eastern (EST))
  - Summer (DST): UTC-4 (EDT)
- ZIP Codes: 04414 (Brownville); 04415 (Brownville Junction); 04481 (Sebec)
- Area code: 207
- FIPS code: 23-08325
- GNIS feature ID: 0582374
- Website: www.brownville.org

Brownville is a town in Piscataquis County, Maine, United States. The population was 1,139 at the 2020 census. The town includes the villages of Brownville, Knight's Landing and Brownville Junction, near which passes the 100-Mile Wilderness of the Appalachian Trail.

== History ==
The area was a part of the Waldo Patent purchased by Moses Brown and Major Josiah Hill of Newburyport, Massachusetts, who initiated its settlement. In 1806, they built a dam and watermills on the Pleasant River. First known as township T5 R8 NWP, the community was organized in 1819 as Brownville Plantation. It was named for Francis Brown (nephew of Moses Brown), who was a mill owner and trader from Newbury, Massachusetts. In 1824, the town was incorporated as Brownville.

Early settlers were given 50 acres (200,000 m^{2}) to clear and cultivate. Farms produced hay, oats, potatoes, wheat and garden vegetables. Water power from the Pleasant River attracted industry, including sawmills, clapboard mills, gristmills, a shovel handle factory and a carriage factory. Quarries were established to extract the region's abundant slate, the quality of which won first prize at the 1876 Centennial Exposition. In 1843, the Bangor & Piscataquis Slate Company opened with 60 employees. It sent out 8,000-12,000 squares of roofing slate annually. The Merrill Quarry opened in 1846 with approximately 80 employees, producing 30,000 squares of roofing slate annually. The Highland Quarry opened with Welsh employees, recruited because they were accustomed to working in slate. The last quarry closed in 1917.

Iron ore was discovered at the foot of Ore Mountain. The Katahdin Iron Works was established in 1843, when roads were cut out and a blast furnace erected. A hotel and several houses were built for workers. Charcoal was made in 14 kilns, consuming 10,000 cords of wood per year. The company and land were sold in 1845, and the new owners operated it until 1856, the year it produced 2350 tons of iron. However, shipping it to Bangor was expensive. The Bangor and Katahdin Iron Works Railway (B&KIW) was constructed to Brownville in 1881, then connected north to the Katahdin Iron Works in 1883.

In 1889 the International Railway of Maine was constructed by its owner Canadian Pacific Railway (CPR), extending the CPR's transcontinental mainline east from Montreal, Quebec to Saint John, New Brunswick. The CPR line passed three miles north of Brownville, where it crossed the B&KIW at a location that was named Brownville Junction. In 1891, the B&KIW merged into the Bangor and Aroostook Railroad (BAR) after the Katahdin Iron Works closed the previous year. The BAR line as well as the CPR line west of Brownville became part of the Montreal, Maine and Atlantic Railway and are now part of the Central Maine and Québec Railway. In 2019, the Canadian Pacific Railway purchased the Central Maine and Québec Railway, once again, giving the railway access to the Port of Saint John running trains from Brownville Junction to New Brunswick via New Brunswick Southern Railway.

Local historian Bill Sawtell has documented many facets of the history of Brownville as well as the surrounding area. He has published numerous books with subjects such as Katahdin Iron Works, the Highland Quarry, the Bangor and Aroostook Railroad, and Penquis Valley High School basketball.

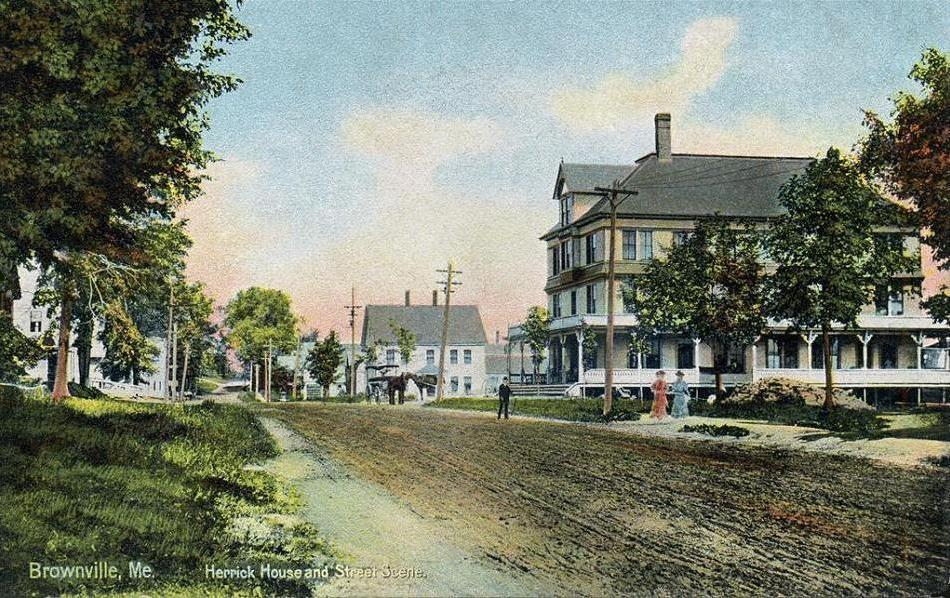
Street scene in 1910

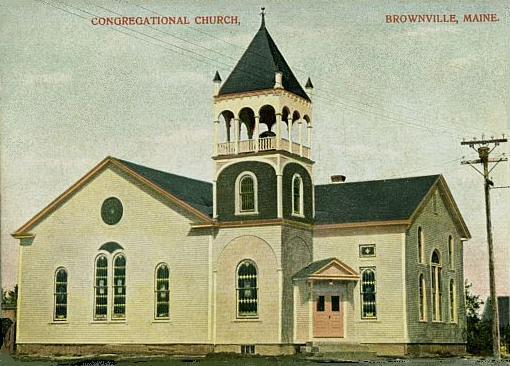
Community Church c. 1905

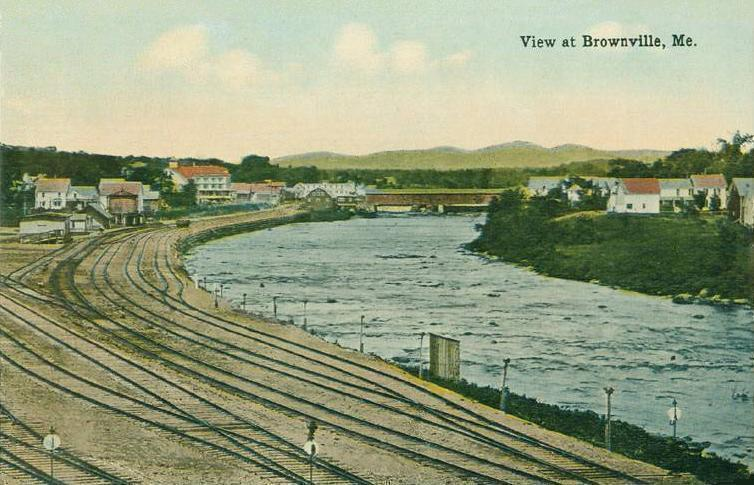
B. & A. R. R. yard c. 1912

== Geography ==
According to the United States Census Bureau, the town has a total area of 44.62 square miles (115.57 km^{2}), of which 44.03 square miles (114.04 km^{2}) is land and 0.59 square miles (1.53 km^{2}) is water. Situated between Sebec and Schoodic lakes, Brownville is drained by the Pleasant River.

=== Climate ===
This climatic region is typified by large seasonal temperature differences, with warm to hot (and often humid) summers and cold (sometimes severely cold) winters. According to the Köppen Climate Classification system, Brownville has a humid continental climate, abbreviated "Dfb" on climate maps.

Climate data for Barnard, Maine, 1991–2020 normals
Month	Jan	Feb	Mar	Apr	May	Jun	Jul	Aug	Sep	Oct	Nov	Dec	Year
Mean daily maximum °F (°C)	25.5 (−3.6)	29.1 (−1.6)	38.3 (3.5)	51.3 (10.7)	64.6 (18.1)	72.9 (22.7)	78.0 (25.6)	77.2 (25.1)	69.8 (21.0)	56.5 (13.6)	43.7 (6.5)	32.0 (0.0)	53.2 (11.8)
Daily mean °F (°C)	15.1 (−9.4)	17.7 (−7.9)	27.6 (−2.4)	40.3 (4.6)	52.6 (11.4)	61.5 (16.4)	67.0 (19.4)	65.7 (18.7)	57.7 (14.3)	45.9 (7.7)	34.8 (1.6)	23.2 (−4.9)	42.4 (5.8)
Mean daily minimum °F (°C)	4.6 (−15.2)	6.4 (−14.2)	16.8 (−8.4)	29.3 (−1.5)	40.6 (4.8)	50.1 (10.1)	55.9 (13.3)	54.2 (12.3)	45.6 (7.6)	35.3 (1.8)	25.9 (−3.4)	14.4 (−9.8)	31.6 (−0.2)
Average precipitation inches (mm)	3.52 (89)	2.99 (76)	3.52 (89)	4.19 (106)	3.92 (100)	4.60 (117)	3.99 (101)	4.09 (104)	3.78 (96)	5.13 (130)	4.28 (109)	4.25 (108)	48.26 (1,225)
Average snowfall inches (cm)	21.2 (54)	21.6 (55)	17.9 (45)	4.3 (11)	0.0 (0.0)	0.0 (0.0)	0.0 (0.0)	0.0 (0.0)	0.0 (0.0)	0.9 (2.3)	5.1 (13)	21.5 (55)	92.5 (235.3)
Average precipitation days (≥ 0.01 in)	10.4	8.6	10.2	11.2	13.1	13.8	14.3	12.6	11.3	12.7	11.9	11.8	141.9
Average snowy days (≥ 0.1 in)	8.4	7.0	6.1	2.1	0.0	0.0	0.0	0.0	0.0	0.4	2.9	7.5	34.4
Source: NOAA

== Demographics ==
Historical population
Census	Pop.	Note	%±
1830	402		—
1840	568		41.3%
1850	787		38.6%
1860	793		0.8%
1870	860		8.4%
1880	896		4.2%
1890	1,074		19.9%
1900	1,570		46.2%
1910	1,808		15.2%
1920	1,743		−3.6%
1930	1,910		9.6%
1940	1,914		0.2%
1950	1,964		2.6%
1960	1,641		−16.4%
1970	1,490		−9.2%
1980	1,545		3.7%
1990	1,506		−2.5%
2000	1,259		−16.4%
2010	1,250		−0.7%
2020	1,139		−8.9%
U.S. Decennial Census

=== 2010 census ===
As of the census of 2010, there were 1,250 people, 527 households, and 347 families living in the town. The population density was 28.4 inhabitants per square mile (11.0/km^{2}). There were 738 housing units at an average density of 16.8 per square mile (6.5/km^{2}). The racial makeup of the town was 97.3% White, 0.6% African American, 0.2% Native American, 0.5% from other races, and 1.4% from two or more races. Hispanic or Latino people of any race were 1.3% of the population.

There were 527 households, of which 29.4% had children under the age of 18 living with them, 48.0% were married couples living together, 9.9% had a female householder with no husband present, 8.0% had a male householder with no wife present, and 34.2% were non-families. 27.9% of all households were made up of individuals, and 12.6% had someone living alone who was 65 years of age or older. The average household size was 2.37 and the average family size was 2.82.

The median age in the town was 44.5 years. 22.7% of residents were under the age of 18; 6.5% were between the ages of 18 and 24; 21.4% were from 25 to 44; 32.1% were from 45 to 64; and 17.4% were 65 years of age or older. The gender makeup of the town was 52.8% male and 47.2% female.

=== 2000 census ===
As of the census of 2000, there were 1,259 people, 555 households, and 360 families living in the town. The population density was 28.4 inhabitants per square mile (11.0/km^{2}). There were 726 housing units at an average density of 16.4 per square mile (6.3/km^{2}). The racial makeup of the town was 98.09% White, 1.03% Native American, 0.08% Asian, 0.24% from other races, and 0.56% from two or more races. Hispanic or Latino people of any race were 0.87% of the population.

There were 555 households, out of which 25.9% had children under the age of 18 living with them, 54.4% were married couples living together, 7.0% had a female householder with no husband present, and 35.0% were non-families. 31.0% of all households were made up of individuals, and 19.5% had someone living alone who was 65 years of age or older. The average household size was 2.26 and the average family size was 2.80.

In the town, the population was spread out, with 21.8% under the age of 18, 6.1% from 18 to 24, 25.6% from 25 to 44, 26.1% from 45 to 64, and 20.4% who were 65 years of age or older. The median age was 43 years. For every 100 females, there were 94.9 males. For every 100 females age 18 and over, there were 92.4 males.

The median income for a household in the town was $28,167, and the median income for a family was $35,446. Males had a median income of $31,141 versus $18,382 for females. The per capita income for the town was $14,774. About 12.1% of families and 13.6% of the population were below the poverty line, including 12.5% of those under age 18 and 12.3% of those age 65 or over.
