= Pleasant River (Piscataquis River tributary) =

Location
- Country: United States

Physical characteristics
- Source
  - location: Maine
  - elevation: 350 feet (110 m)
- Mouth
  - location: Piscataquis River
  - coordinates: 45°14′32″N 68°54′36″W
  - elevation: 260 feet (79 m)
- Length: 15 mi (24 km)

Basin features
- Progression: Piscataquis River – Penobscot River
- Tributaries
  - left: East Branch Pleasant River
  - right: West Branch Pleasant River

The Pleasant River is a tributary of the Piscataquis River in Piscataquis County, Maine, United States. From the confluence of the East Branch and West Branch (45°21′54″N 69°03′11″W) in Brownville, the river runs 15.2 miles (24.5 km) south and southeast to its mouth on the Piscataquis in Medford.

== See also ==
- List of rivers of Maine
