= Sobek (disambiguation) =

Sobek is the Egyptian crocodile deity.

Sobek may also refer to:

== Egypt ==
- Satsobek, an Egyptian queen whose name means "Daughter of Sobek"
- Sobekhotep (disambiguation), various meanings derived from an Egyptian name meaning "Sobek is pleased"
- Sobekneferu, a Pharaoh whose name means "Beauty of Sobek"

== People ==
- Hanne Sobek (1900–1989), German international footballer
- Joseph Sobek (1918–1998), American inventor of racquetball
- Paweł Sobek (1929–2015), Polish footballer
- Werner Sobek (born 1953), German architect and structural engineer
  - House R 128, also known as Sobek House, a building designed by Werner Sobek
- Jeanine Sobek (born 1972), women's ice hockey player from Minnesota

== Other ==
- The Skull of Sobek, a 2008 Doctor Who audio drama
- Sobek (comics), a DC Comics character
- Sympistis sobek, a species of moth
- SobekCM, software engine and tools for digital libraries

== See also ==
- Sebec (disambiguation)
- Sebek (disambiguation)
