= Xebec (disambiguation) =

A xebec was a Mediterranean ship mainly used for trading.

It may also refer to:

- Xebec Corporation, an American computer hardware company from 1969 to 1989
- Xebec (studio), a Japanese anime studio from 1995 to 2019

== See also ==
- Zebec
