= Piscataquis =

Piscataquis can refer to:

- Piscataquis River, in Maine, United States
- Piscataquis County, Maine, United States

See also:

- Piscataqua River, Maine/New Hampshire, United States
