= West Branch Piscataquis River =

Location
- Country: United States

Physical characteristics
- Source
  - location: Maine
  - elevation: 1,350 feet (410 m)
- Mouth
  - location: Piscataquis River
  - coordinates: 45°16′58″N 69°35′33″W
  - elevation: 590 feet (180 m)
- Length: about 16 miles (30 km)

Basin features
- Progression: Piscataquis River – Penobscot River

The West Branch Piscataquis River is a 22-mile-long (35 km) tributary of the Piscataquis River in Piscataquis County, Maine. Its source (45°22′59″N 69°45′05″W) is in East Moxie, Somerset County (Maine Township 2, Range 4, BKP EKR). The river runs about 6 miles (10 km) east, then 11 miles (18 km) south, then 5 miles (8 km) east to its confluence with the East Branch Piscataquis River in Blanchard to form the Piscataquis.

The Appalachian Trail crosses the West Branch just below Bald Mountain Stream, and runs along the north bank of the river for about 4 miles (6 km) in Blanchard, to the joining with the East Branch.

== See also ==
- List of rivers of Maine
