= Berenice Abbott =

American photographer (1898–1991)

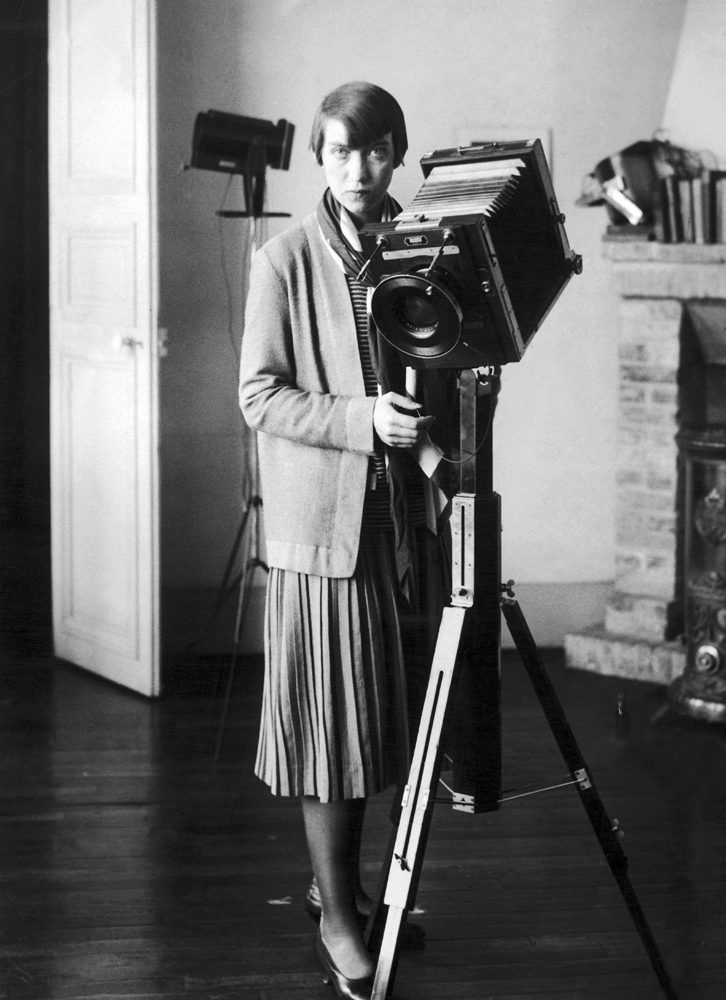
- Abbott in the 1930s
- Born: Berenice Alice Abbott; July 17, 1898; Springfield, Ohio, US
- Died: December 9, 1991 (aged 93); Monson, Maine, US
- Resting place: New Blanchard Cemetery, Blanchard, Maine, U.S.
- Known for: Photography

Berenice Alice Abbott (July 17, 1898 – December 9, 1991) was an American photographer best known for her portraits of cultural figures of the interwar period, New York City photographs of architecture and urban design of the 1930s, and science interpretation of the 1940s to the 1960s.

Super Sight, also known as the Abbott Process, is a form of macro photography developed in the early 1940s by Berenice Abbott.

== Early life and education ==
Abbott was born in Springfield, Ohio, on July 17, 1898, and was raised in Ohio by her divorced mother, née Lillian Alice Bunn (m. Charles E. Abbott in Chillicothe, Ohio, 1886).

She attended The Ohio State University for two semesters, but left in early 1918 when her professor was dismissed because he was a German teaching an English class. She moved to New York City, where she studied sculpture and painting. In 1921 she traveled to Paris and studied sculpture with Emile Bourdelle. While in Paris, she became an assistant to Man Ray, who wanted someone with no previous knowledge of photography. Abbott took revealing portraits of Ray's fellow artists.

== Trip to Europe, photography and poetry ==
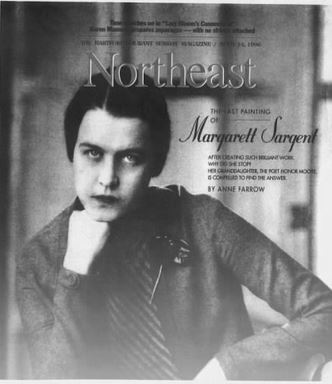
Photograph by Abbott of her friend Margarett Sargent taken in Paris in 1928

Her university studies included theater and sculpture. She spent two years studying sculpture in Paris and Berlin. She studied at the Académie de la Grande Chaumière in Paris and the Prussian Academy of Arts in Berlin. During this time, she adopted the French spelling of her first name, "Berenice," at the suggestion of Djuna Barnes. In addition to her work in the visual arts, Abbott published poetry in the experimental literary journal transition. Abbott first became involved with photography in 1923, when Man Ray hired her as a darkroom assistant at his portrait studio in Montparnasse. Later, she wrote: "I took to photography like a duck to water. I never wanted to do anything else." Ray was impressed by her darkroom work and allowed her to use his studio to take her own photographs. In 1921 her first major works was in an exhibition in the Parisian gallery Le Sacre du Printemps. After a short time studying photography in Berlin, she returned to Paris in 1927 and started a second studio, on the rue Servandoni. Berenice Abbott's trip to Europe, particularly Paris, was a pivotal moment in her artistic development, leading to her career as a renowned photographer.

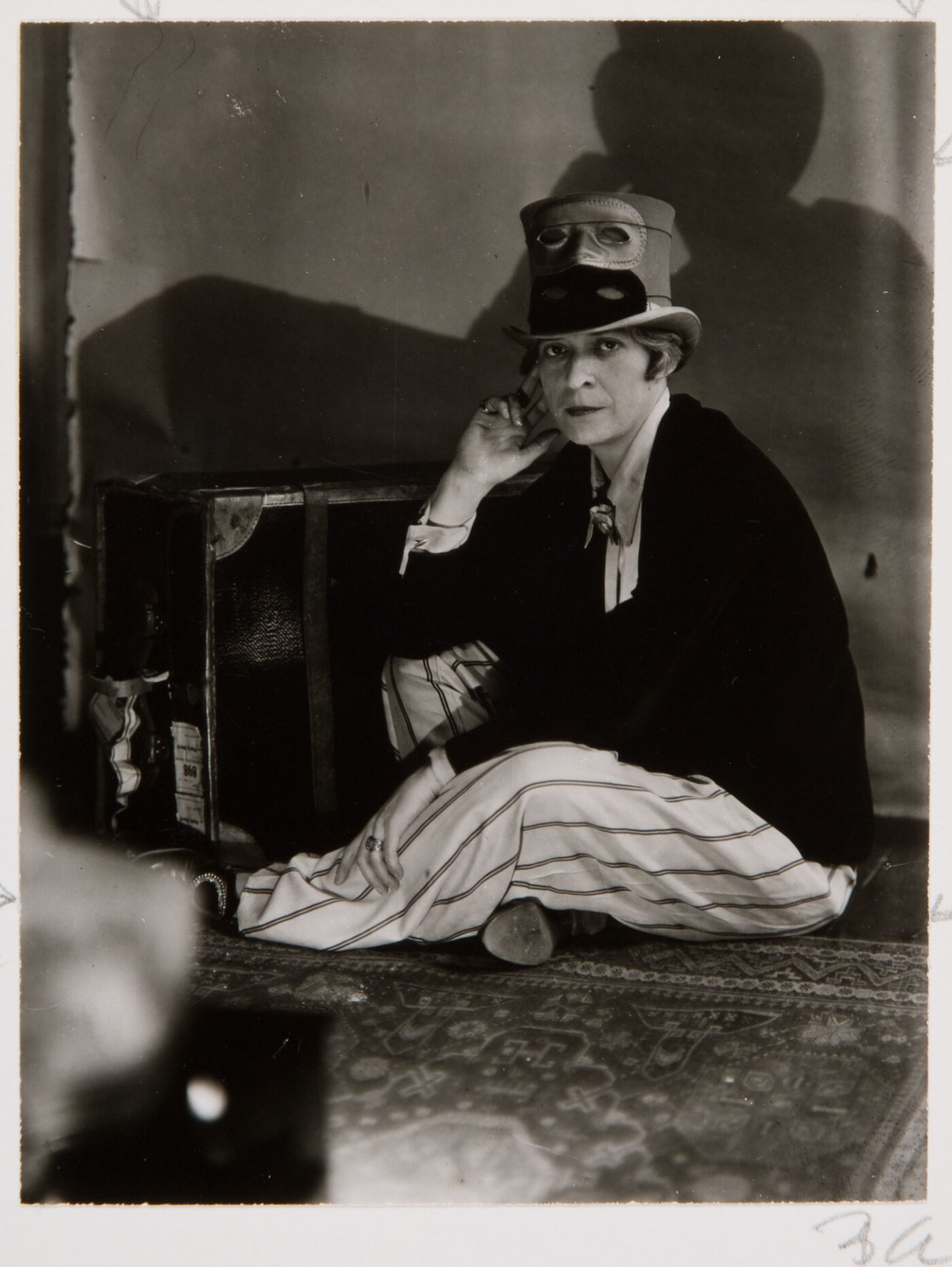
Abbott's photograph of Janet Flanner in 1925

Abbott's subjects were people in the artistic and literary worlds, including French nationals (Jean Cocteau), expatriates (James Joyce), and others just passing through the city. According to Sylvia Beach, "To be 'done' by Man Ray or Berenice Abbott meant you rated as somebody". Abbott's work was exhibited with that of Man Ray, André Kertész, and others in Paris, in the "Salon de l'Escalier" (more formally, the Premier Salon Indépendant de la Photographie), and on the staircase of the Théâtre des Champs-Élysées. Her portraiture was unusual within exhibitions of modernist photography held in 1928–1929 in Brussels and Germany.

In 1925, Man Ray introduced her to Eugène Atget's photographs. She became interested in Atget's work, and managed to persuade him to sit for a portrait in 1927. He died shortly thereafter. She acquired the prints and negatives remaining in Eugène Atget's studio at his death in 1927. While the government acquired much of Atget's archive – Atget had sold 2,621 negatives in 1920, and his friend and executor André Calmettes sold 2,000 more immediately after his death — Abbott was able to buy the remainder in June 1928, and quickly started work on its promotion. An early tangible result was the 1930 book Atget, photographe de Paris, in which she is described as photo editor. Due to a lack of funding, Abbott sold a one-half interest in the collection to Julien Levy for $1,000. Abbott's work on Atget's behalf would continue until her sale of the archive to the Museum of Modern Art in 1968. In addition to her book The World of Atget (1964), she provided the photographs for A Vision of Paris (1963), published a portfolio, Twenty Photographs, and wrote essays. Her sustained efforts helped Atget gain international recognition.

Before his work was discovered by a group of young foreign artists connected to Surrealism, specifically American photographers Man Ray and Berenice Abbott, Atget was not well known outside of Paris. Abbott met the photographer shortly before Atget died in 1927 and bought the remainder of his estate, which contained thousands of prints and over a thousand negatives. Abbott supported Atget's ideas of Paris as "realism unadorned" and chronicled the architectural environment of New York City. She preserved the creative heritage of the humble "author-producer," who never called himself a photographer, by promoting Atget's images to audiences around the world for decades through books and exhibitions. Her significant contribution to upholding Eugène Atget's legacy is sometimes overlooked. She helped ensure his posthumous position as a pioneer in documentary photography by actively promoting his archive through books and exhibitions in addition to buying it.

== Changing New York ==
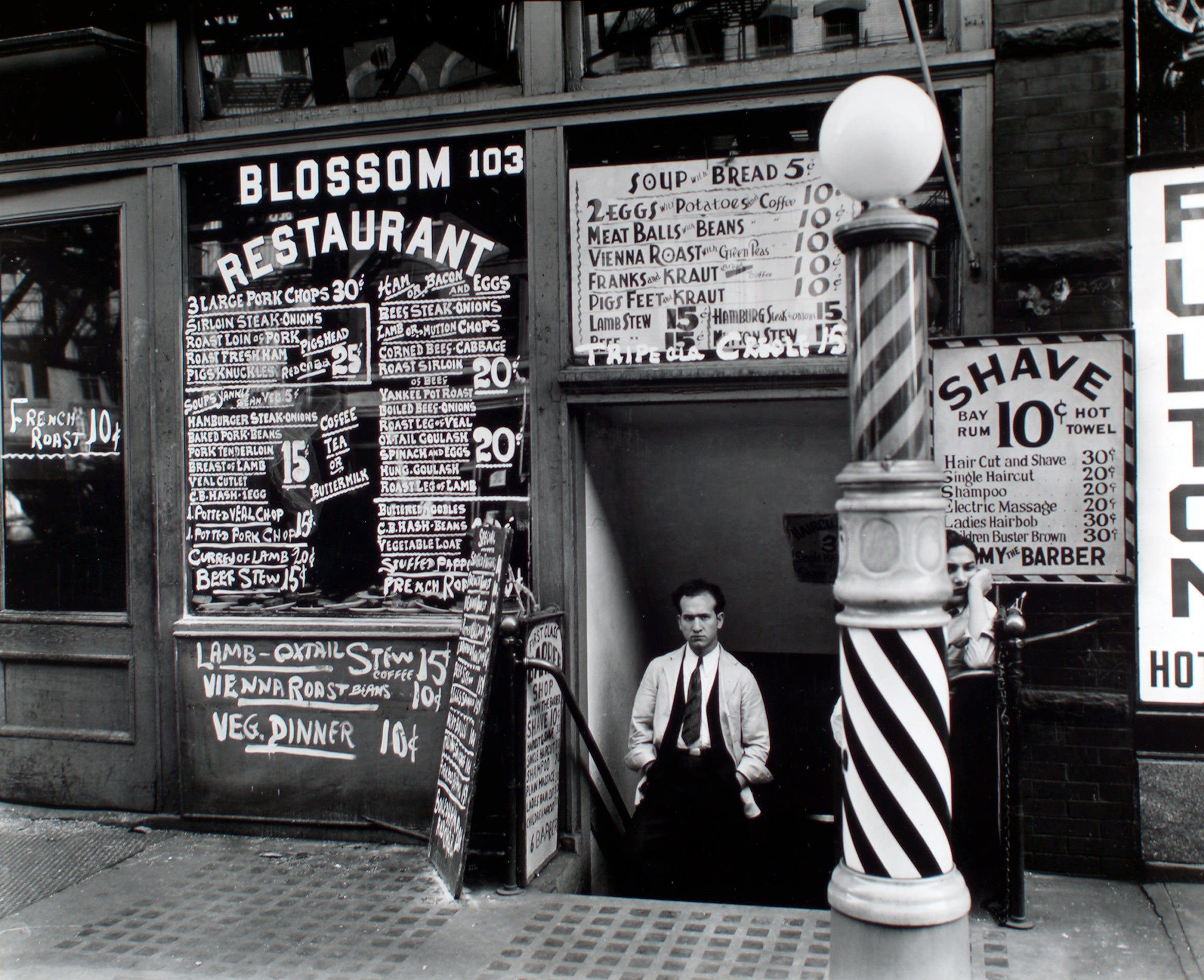
Bowery restaurant photograph for Changing New York, 1935.

In early 1929, Abbott visited New York City, ostensibly with the goal of finding an American publisher for Atget's photographs. Upon seeing the city again, Abbott recognized its photographic potential. She went back to Paris, closed up her studio, and returned to New York in September. There, over the next decade, she focused on documentary photography and on portraying the city as it underwent a transformation into a modern metropolis. During this period, Abbott became a central figure and important bridge between the photographic hubs and circles of Paris and New York City.

Her first photographs of New York were taken with a hand-held Kurt-Bentzin camera, but soon she acquired a Century Universal camera, which produced 8 × 10-inch negatives. Using this large format camera, Abbott photographed the city with the diligence and attention to detail she had so admired in Eugène Atget. After Atget's death in 1927, she and Julien Levy had acquired a large portion of his negatives and glass slides, which she then brought over to New York in 1929. Her subsequent work provides a historical chronicle of many now-destroyed buildings and neighborhoods in Manhattan. Abbott had her first exhibition in New York in 1937 entitled "Changing New York" at the Museum of the City of New York. A book under the same title was also published, depicting the city's physical transformation, including changes to its neighborhoods and the replacing of low rise buildings with skyscrapers.

Abbott worked on her New York project independently for six years, unable to get financial support from organizations (such as the Museum of the City of New York), foundations (such as the Guggenheim Foundation), or individuals. She supported herself with commercial work and with teaching gigs at the New School of Social Research beginning in 1933.

In 1935, Abbott was hired by the Federal Art Project (FAP) as a project supervisor for her "Changing New York" project. While she continued to take photographs of the city, she hired assistants to help her in the field and in the office. This arrangement allowed Abbott to devote all her time to producing, printing, and exhibiting her photographs. By the time she resigned from the FAP in 1939, she had produced 305 photographs that were then deposited at the Museum of the City of New York.

Abbott's project was primarily a sociological study embedded within modernist aesthetic practices. She sought to create a broadly inclusive collection of photographs that together suggest a vital interaction between three aspects of urban life: the diverse people of the city; the places they live, work and play; and their daily activities. It was intended to empower people by making them realize that their environment was a consequence of their collective behavior (and vice versa). Moreover, she avoided the merely pretty in favor of what she described as "fantastic" contrasts between the old and the new, and chose her camera angles and lenses to create compositions that either stabilized a subject (if she approved of it), or destabilized it (if she scorned it).

Abbott's ideas about New York were highly influenced by Lewis Mumford's historical writings from the early 1930s, which divided American history into a series of technological eras. Abbott, like Mumford, was particularly critical of America's "paleotechnic era", which, as he described it, emerged at the end of the American Civil War, a development other historians have dubbed the Second Industrial Revolution. Like Mumford, Abbott was hopeful that, through urban planning efforts (aided by her photographs), Americans would be able to wrest control of their cities away from paleotechnic forces and bring about what Mumford described as a more humane and human-scaled, "neotechnic era". Abbott's agreement with Mumford can be seen especially in the ways that she photographed buildings that had been constructed in the paleotechnic era – before the advent of urban planning. Most often, buildings from this era appeared in Abbott's photographs in compositions that made them look downright menacing.

In 1935, Abbott moved into a Greenwich Village loft with art critic Elizabeth McCausland, with whom she lived until McCausland's death in 1965. McCausland was an ardent supporter of Abbott, writing several articles for the Springfield Daily Republican, as well as for Trend and New Masses (the latter under the pseudonym Elizabeth Noble). In addition, McCausland contributed the captions for Changing New York which was published in 1939. Although well-received, the final book showed important differences from the one initially envisioned by Abbott and McCausland, especially with respect to captions and sequencing. In 1949, her photography book Greenwich Village Today and Yesterday was published by Harper & Brothers.

Ralph Steiner wrote in PM that Abbott's work was "the greatest collection of photographs of New York City ever made."

As the city and architecture are two main themes in Abbott's photographs, her work has been commented on and reviewed together with the work of Eugène Atget and fr:Amanda Bouchenoire, in the book Architecture and Cities. Three Photographic Gazes, where author Jerome Saltz analyzes historicist perspectives and considers their aesthetic implications: "(...) the three authors coincide in the search for and exaltation of intrinsic beauty in their objectives, regardless of quality and clarity of their references."

=== Gallery ===
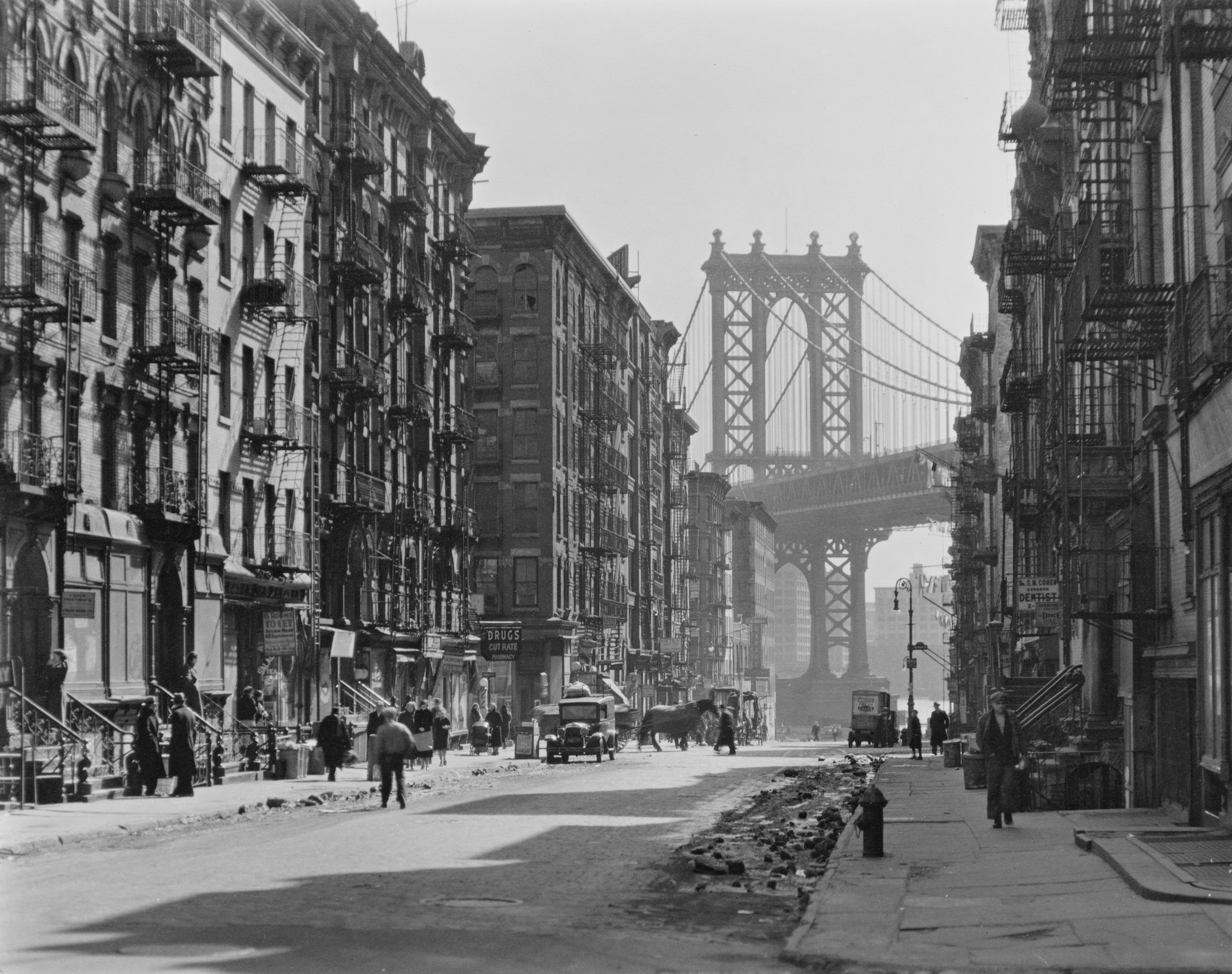
Pike Street at Henry Street (1936)

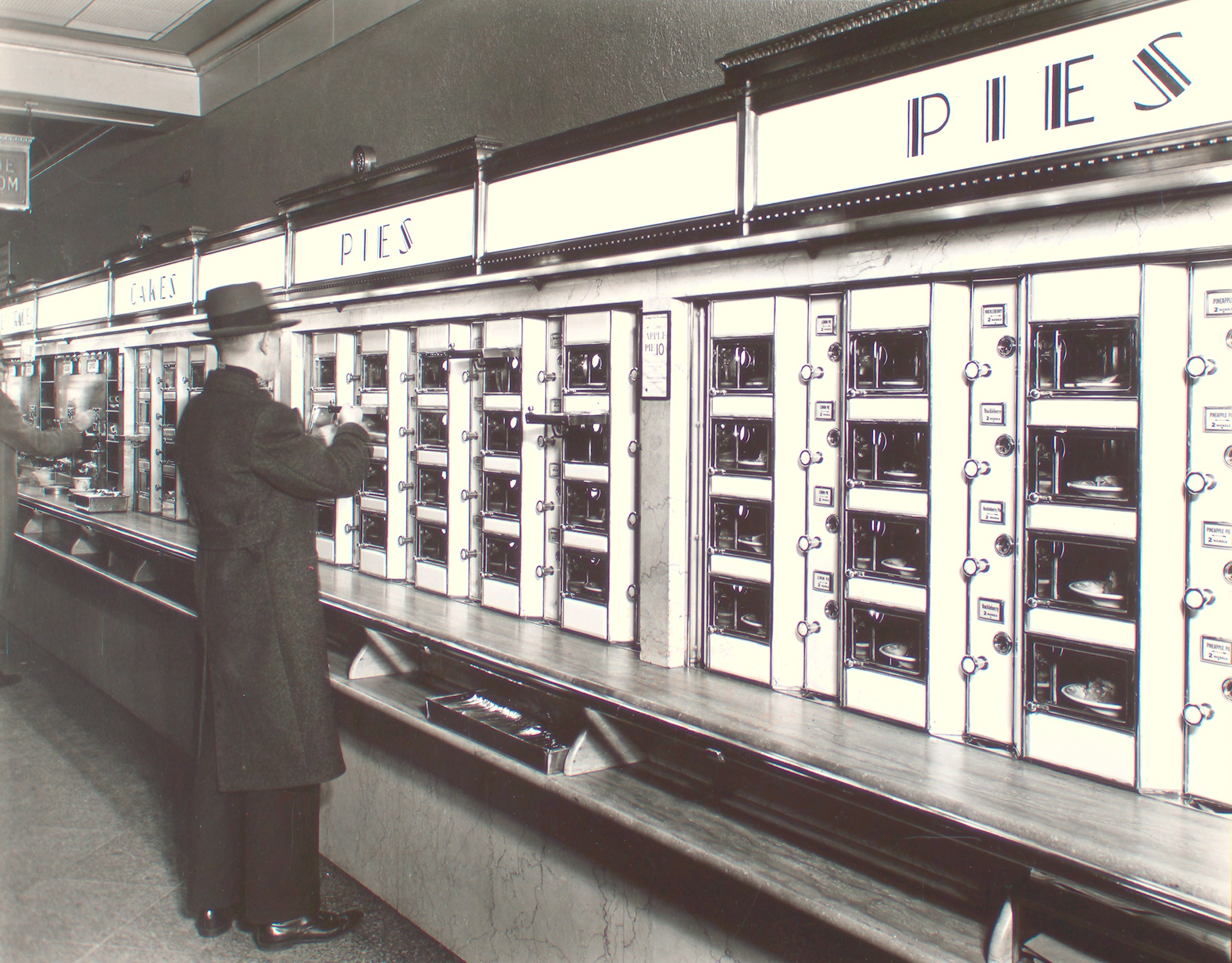
Automat in Manhattan (1936)

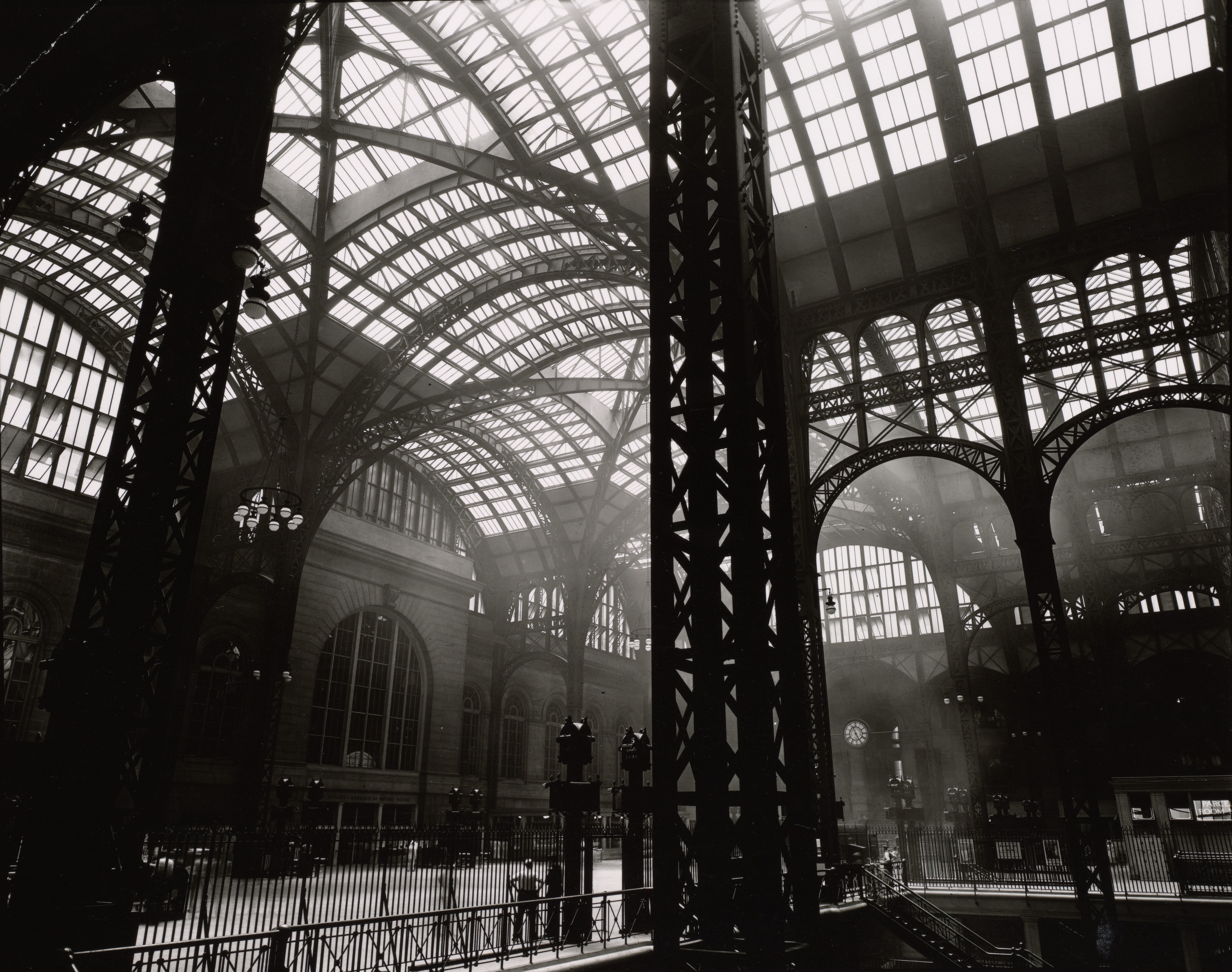
Pennsylvania Station (1936)

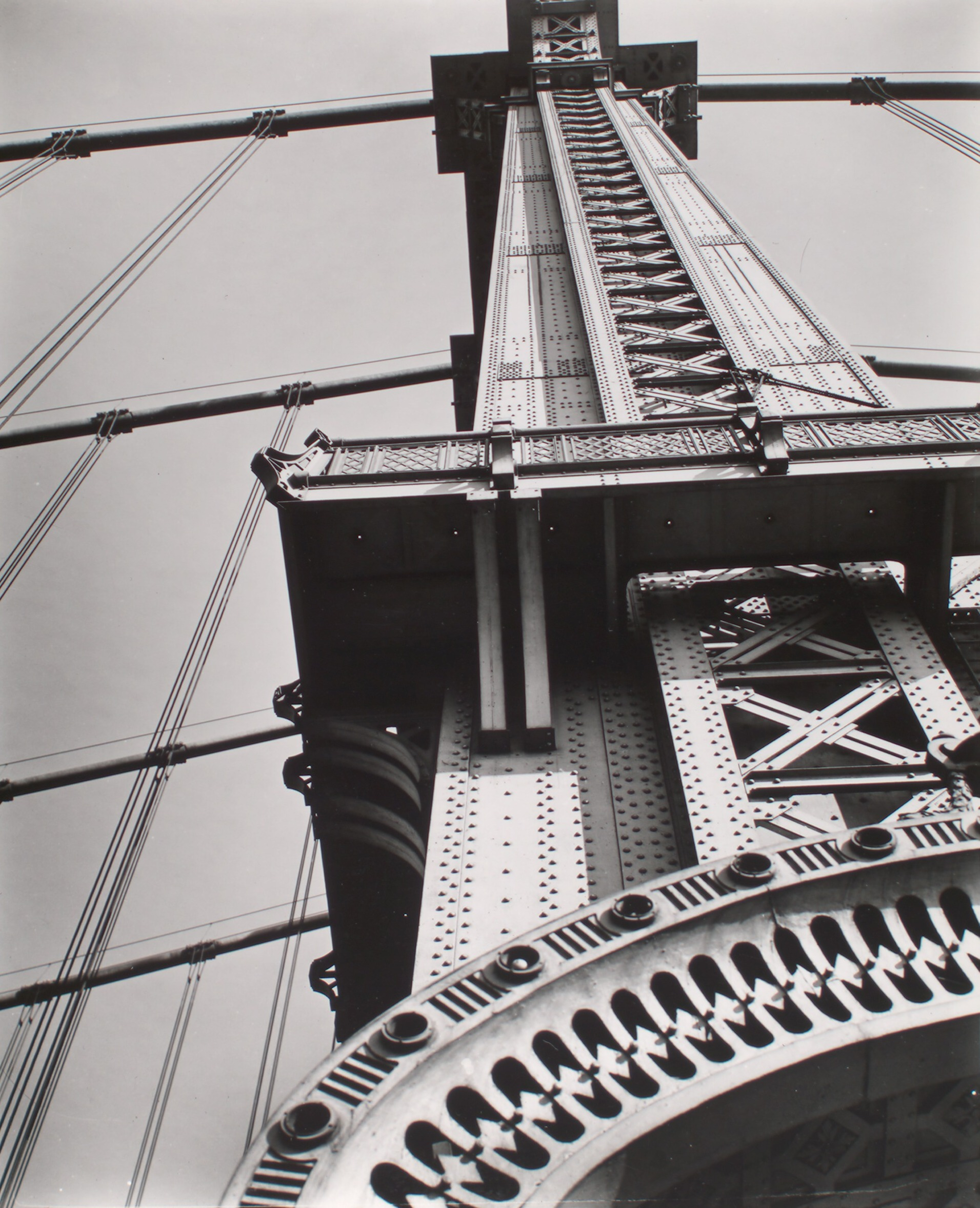
Detail of Manhattan Bridge (1936)

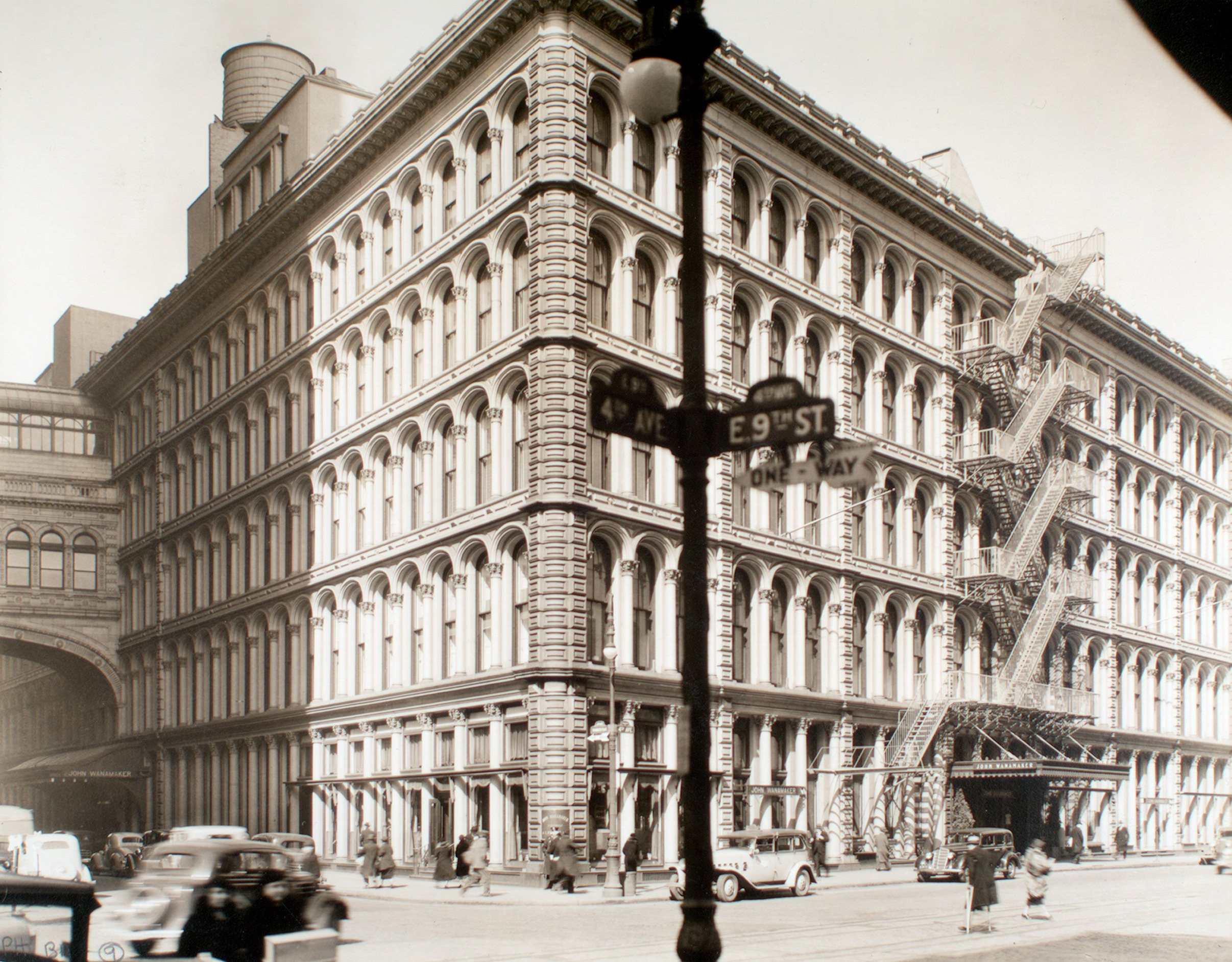
Wanamaker's department store, Fourth Avenue and Ninth Street (1936)

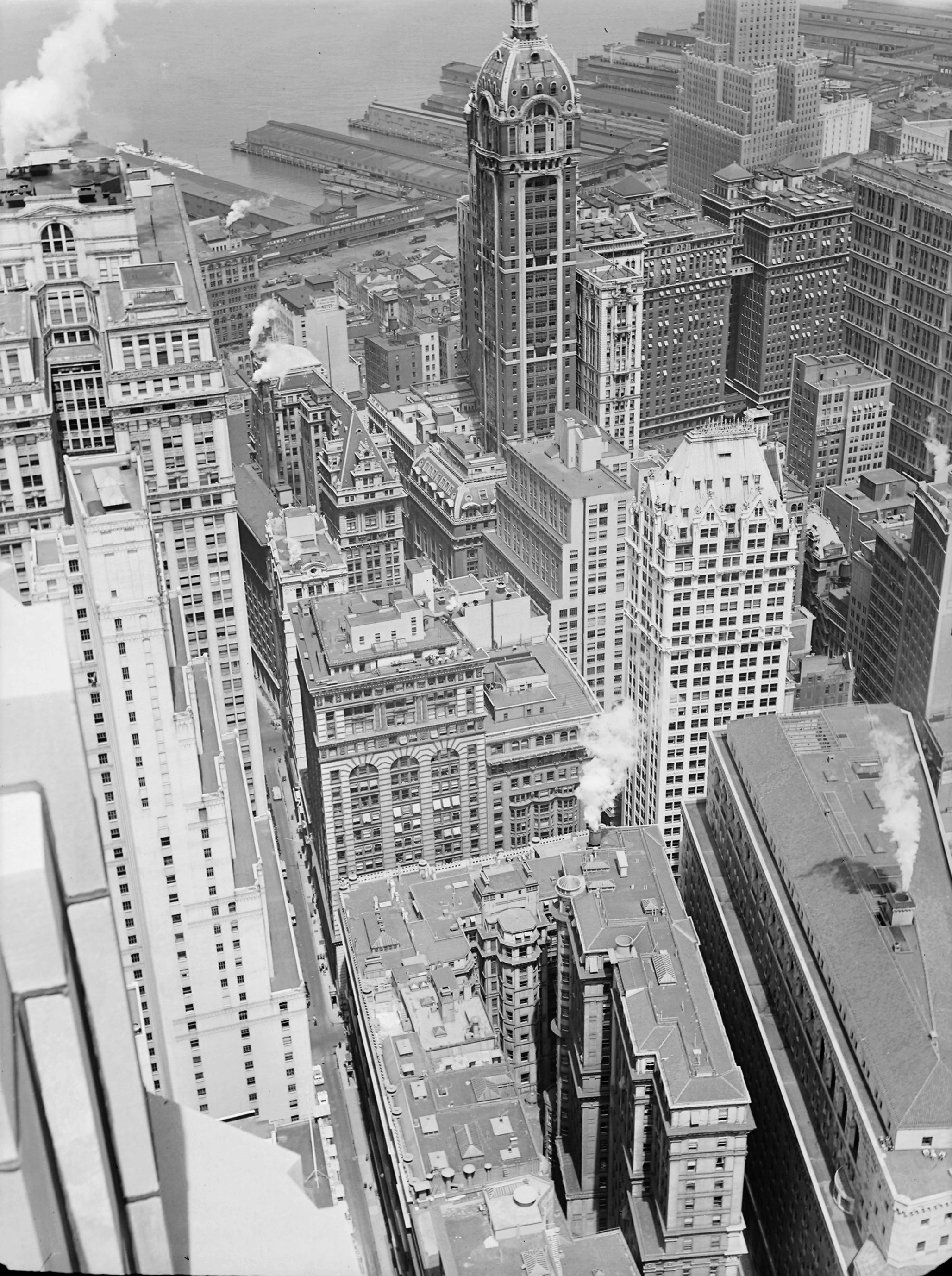
Financial District rooftops (1938)

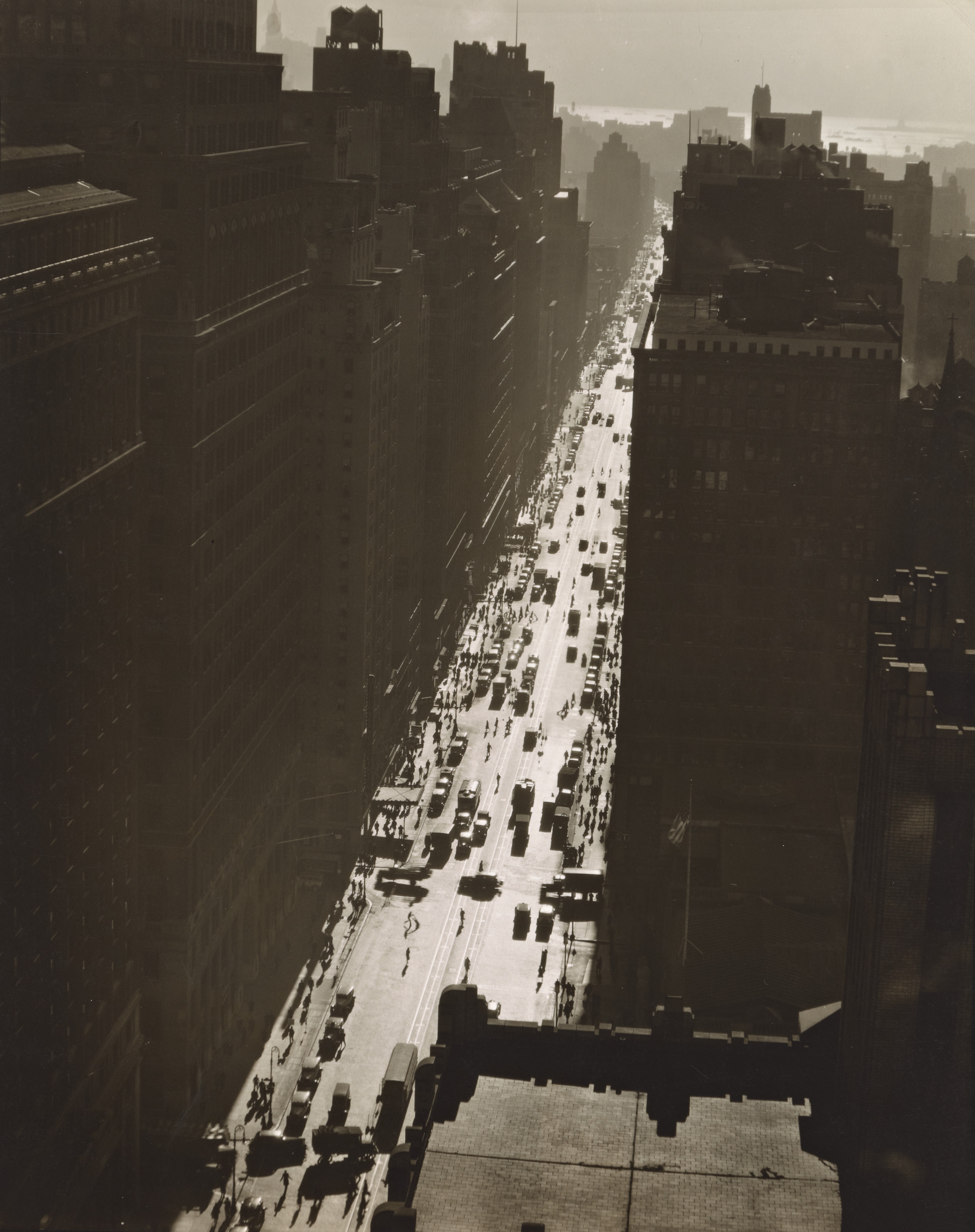
Seventh Avenue, looking south from 35th Street (1935)

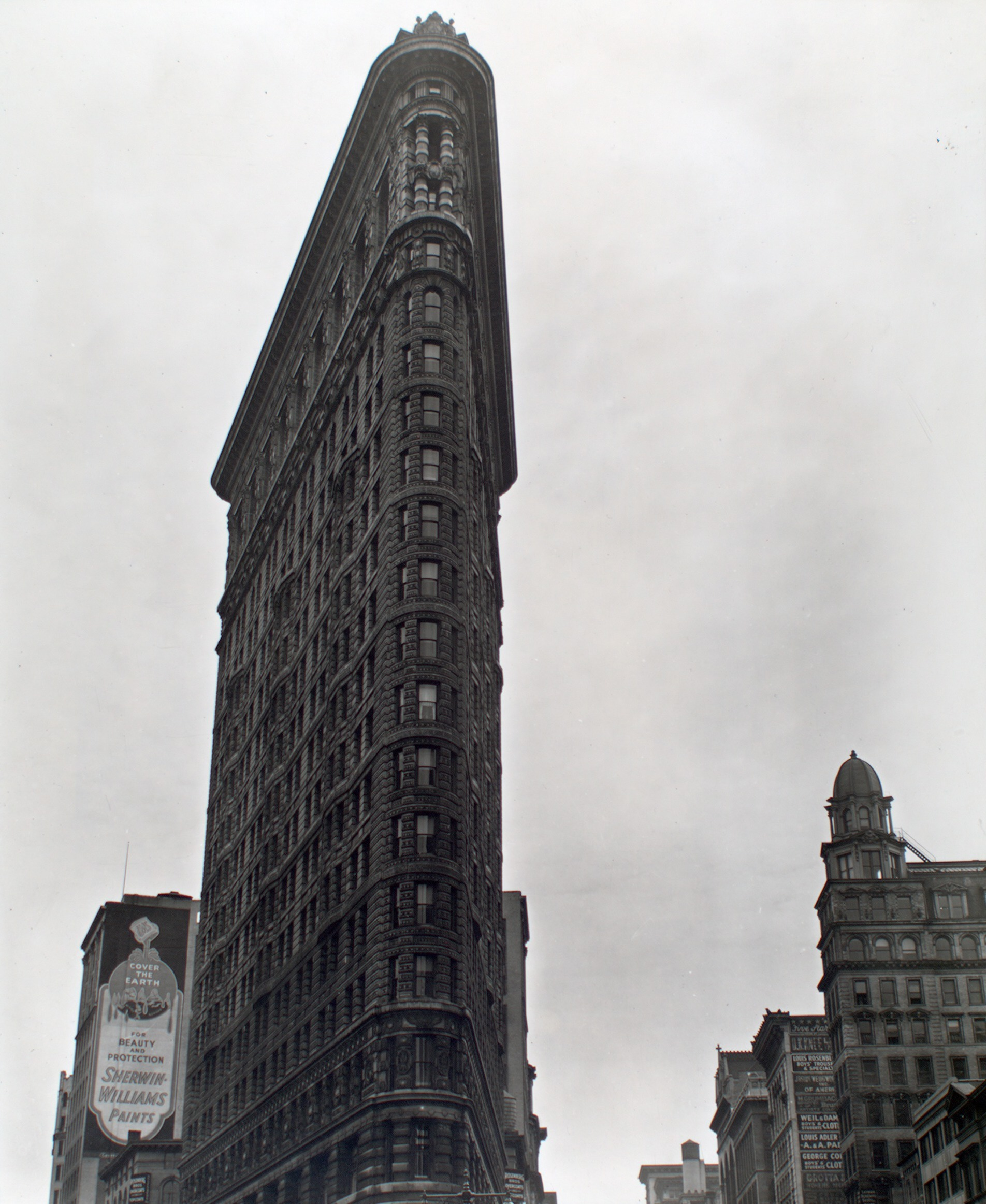
Flatiron Building (1938)

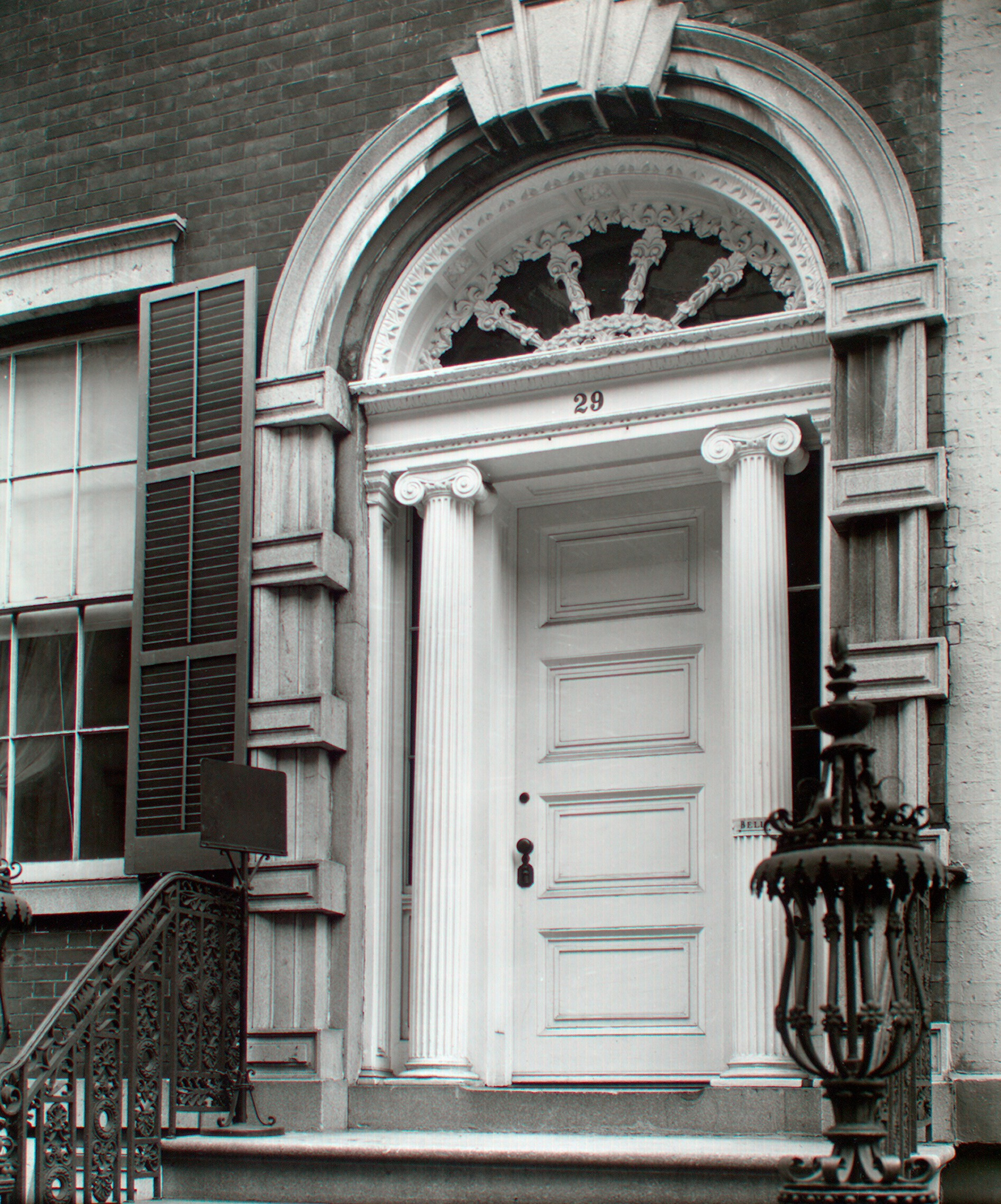
Merchant's House Museum doorway on 29 East 4th Street, Manhattan (1937)

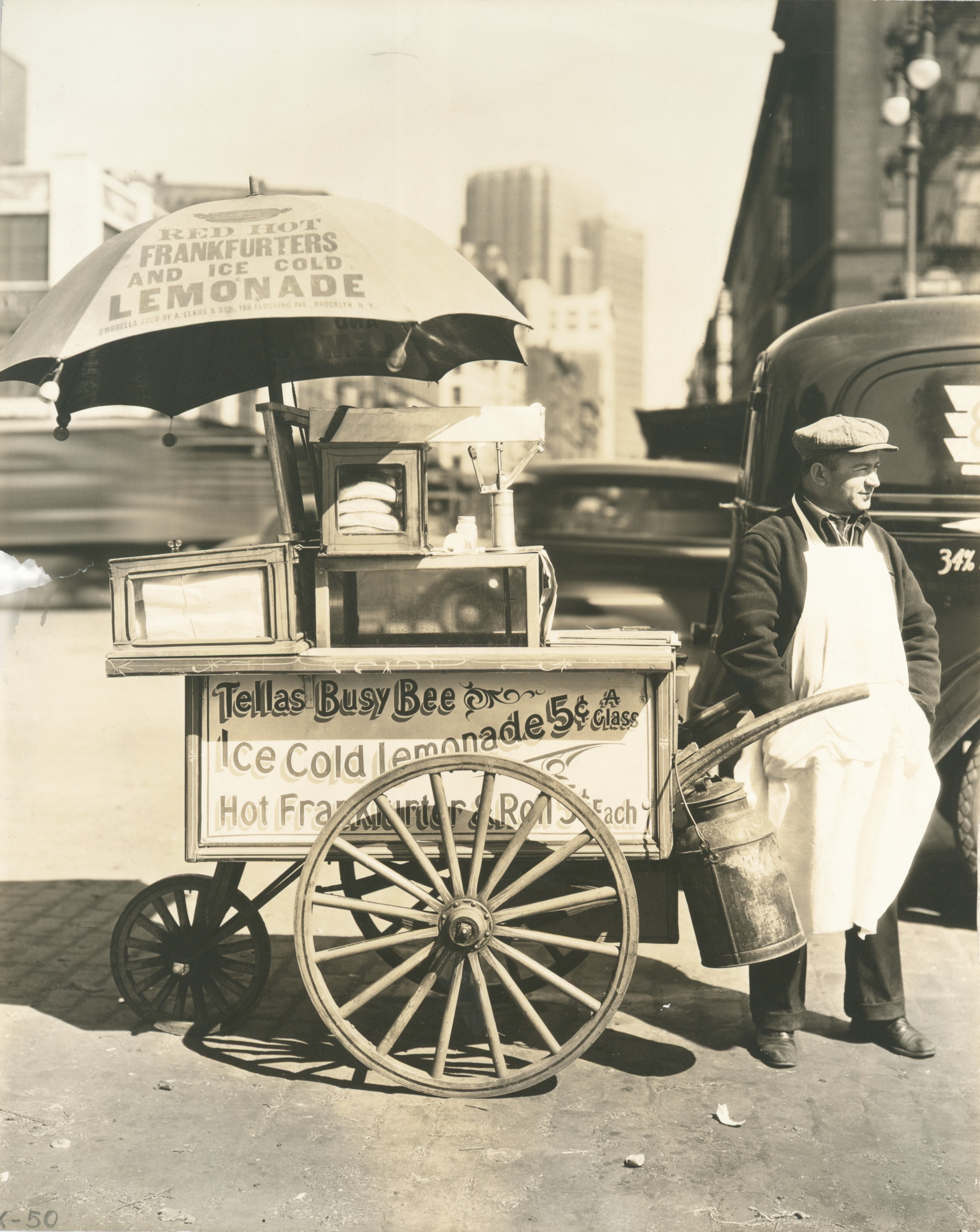
Hot dog stand, North Moore Street, Manhattan (1936)

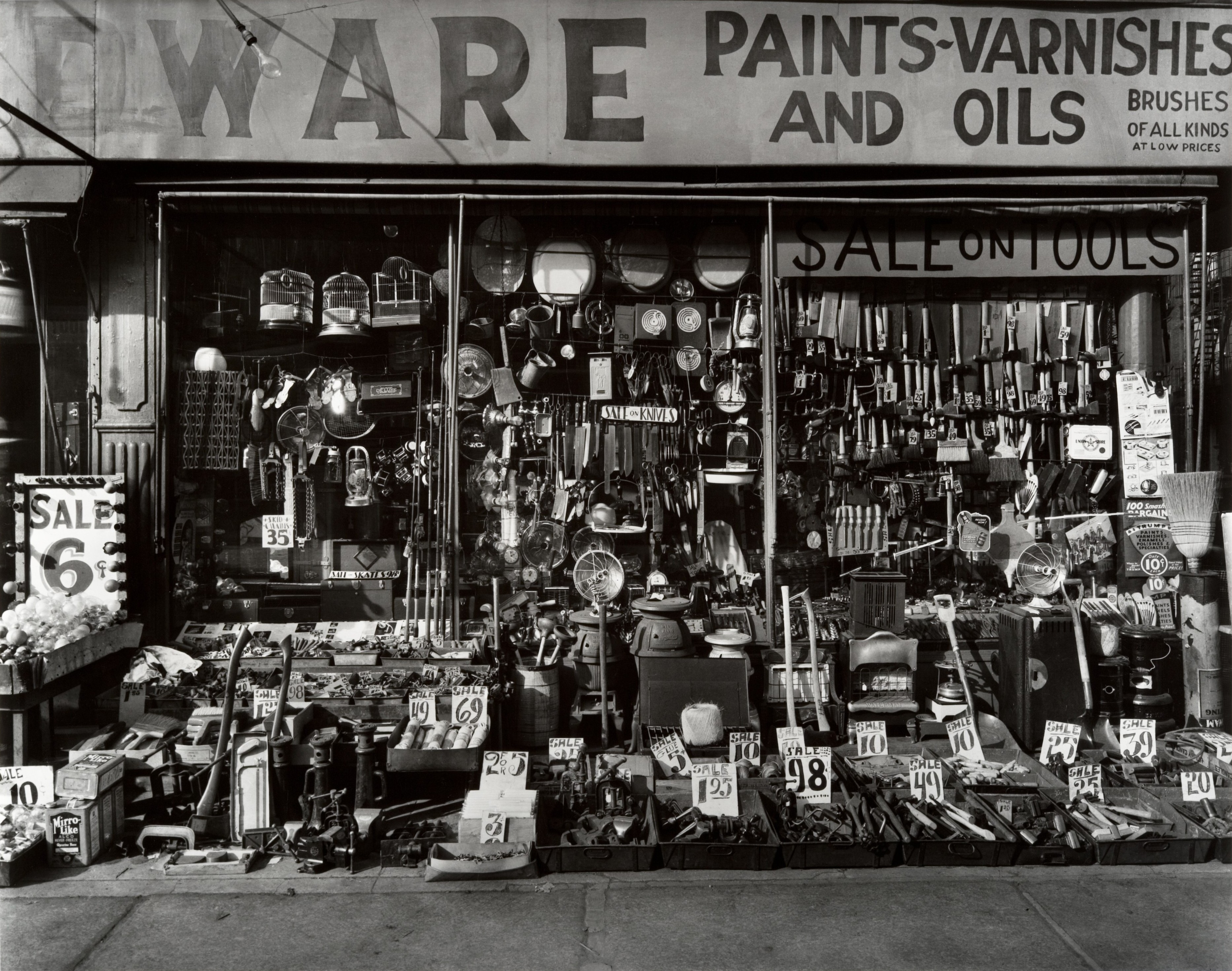
Hardware store on the Bowery in Manhattan (1938)

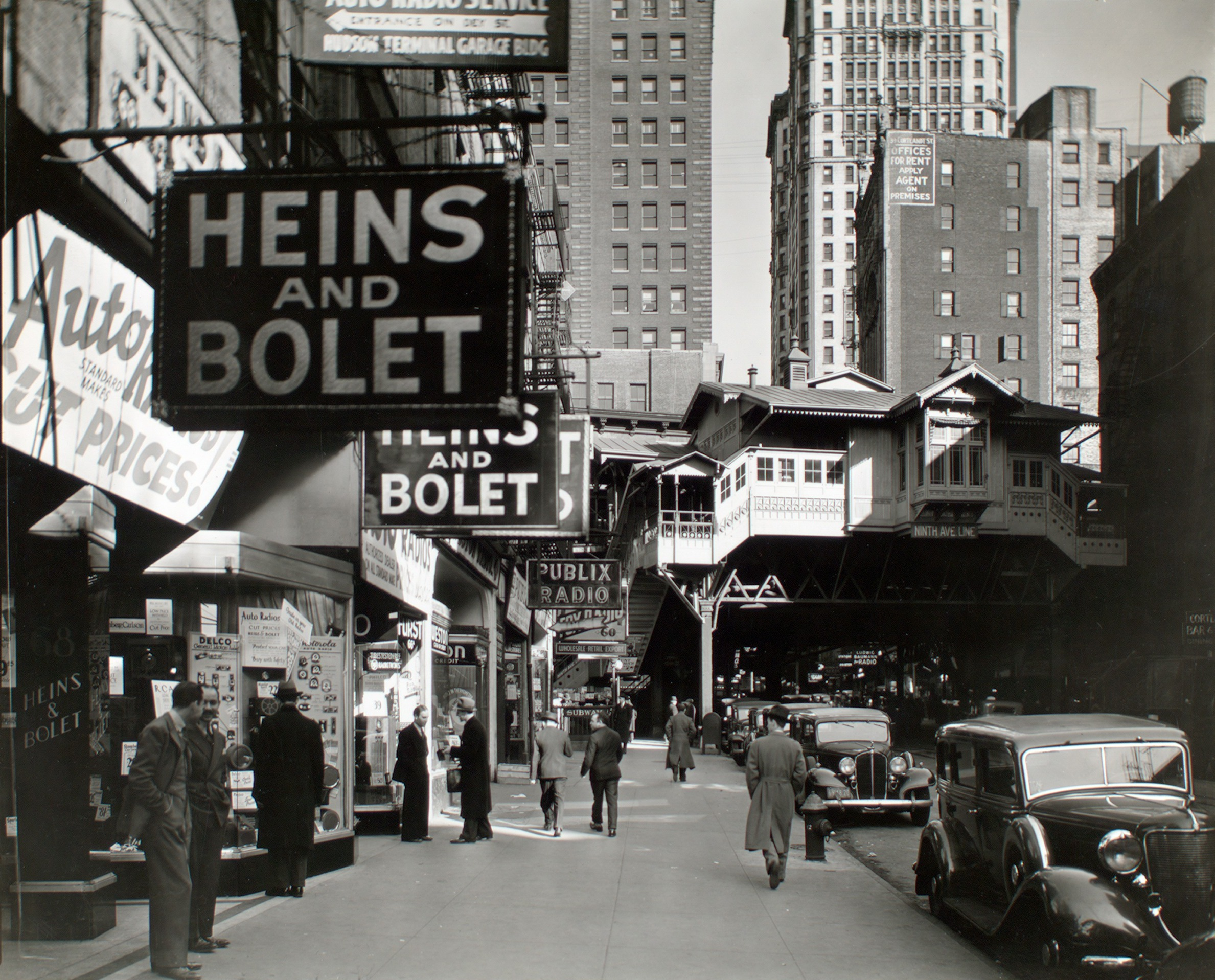
Radio Row at Cortlandt Street (1936)

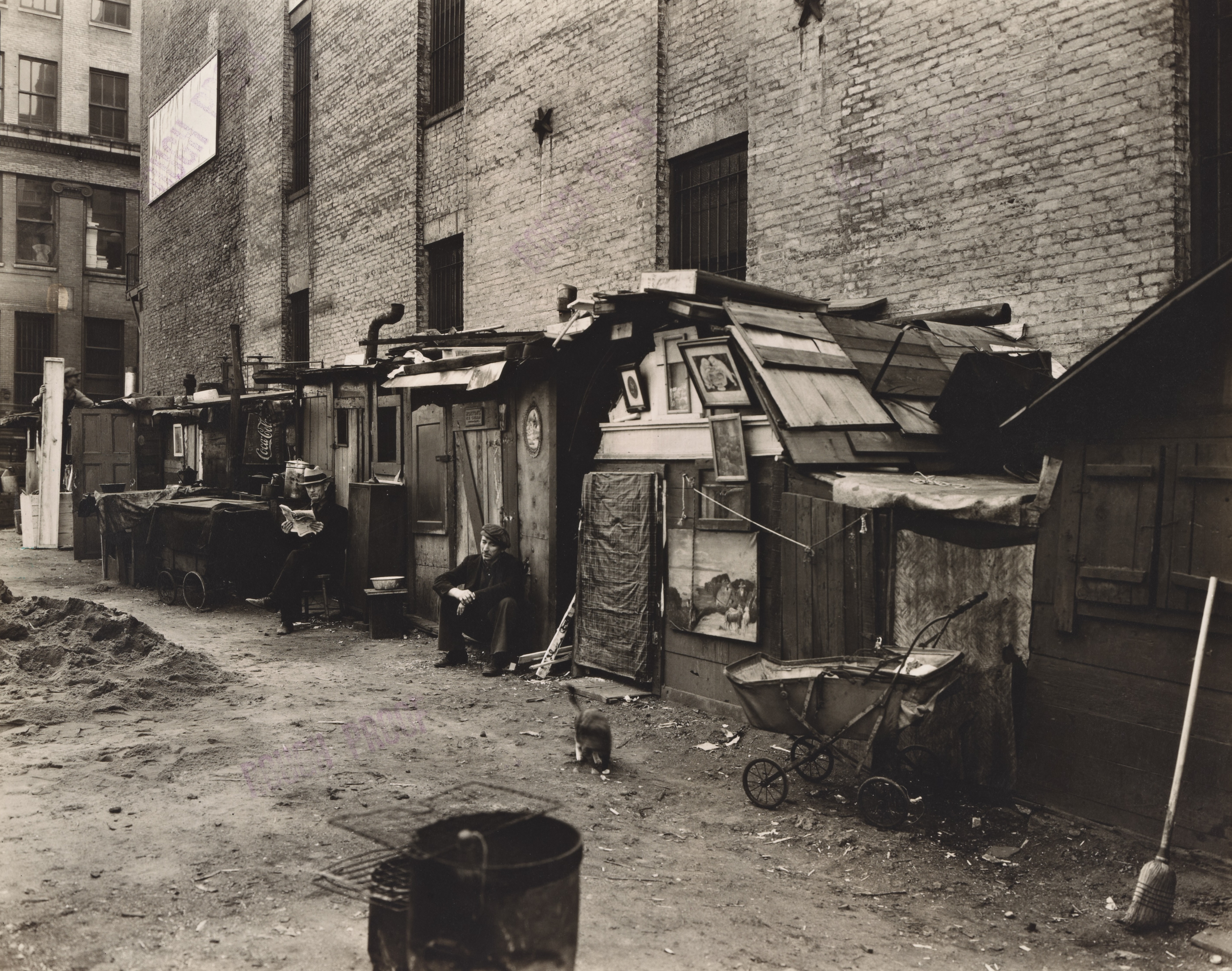
Encampment of the unemployed, New York City, 1935

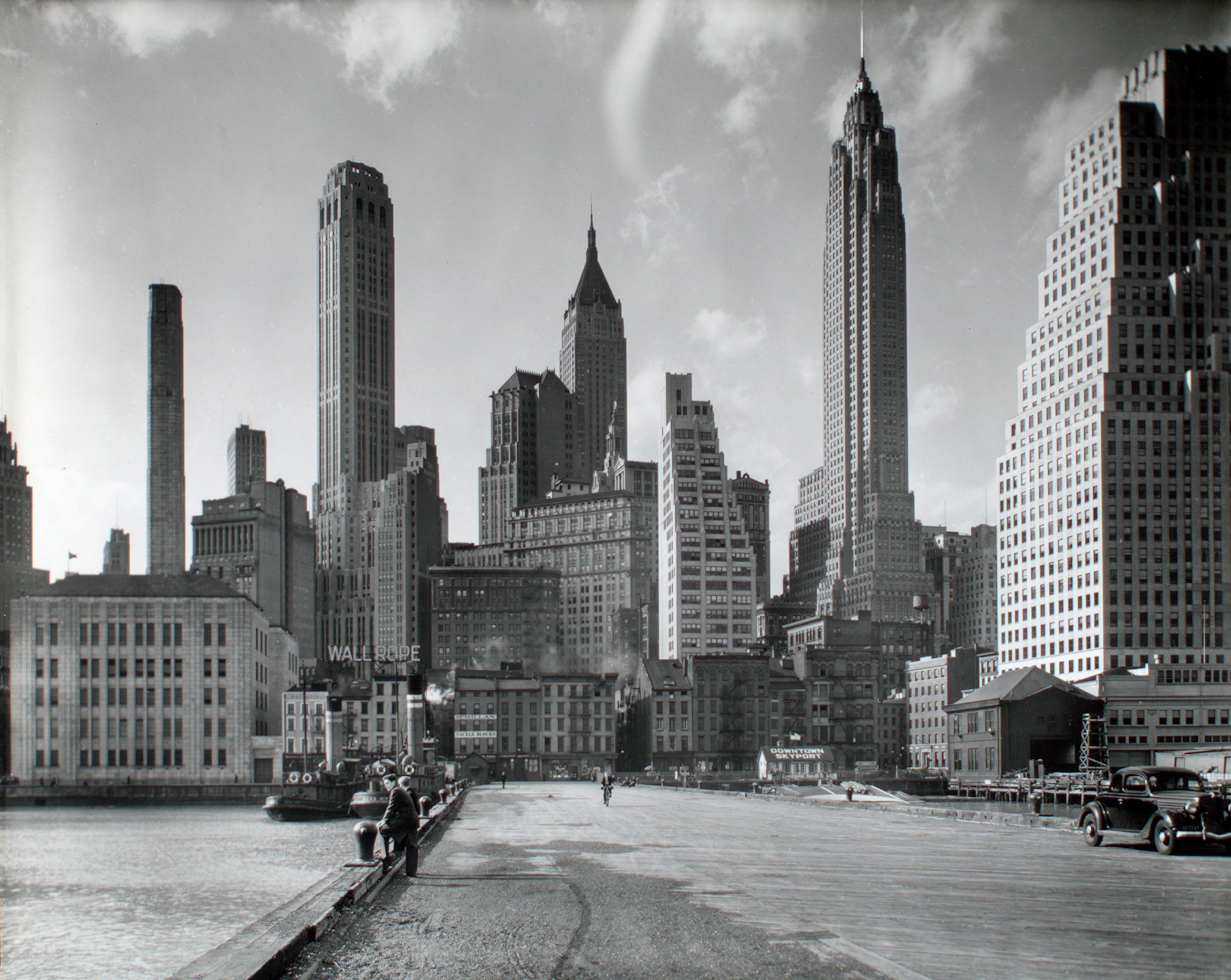
Manhattan skyline in 1936.

== Beyond New York City ==
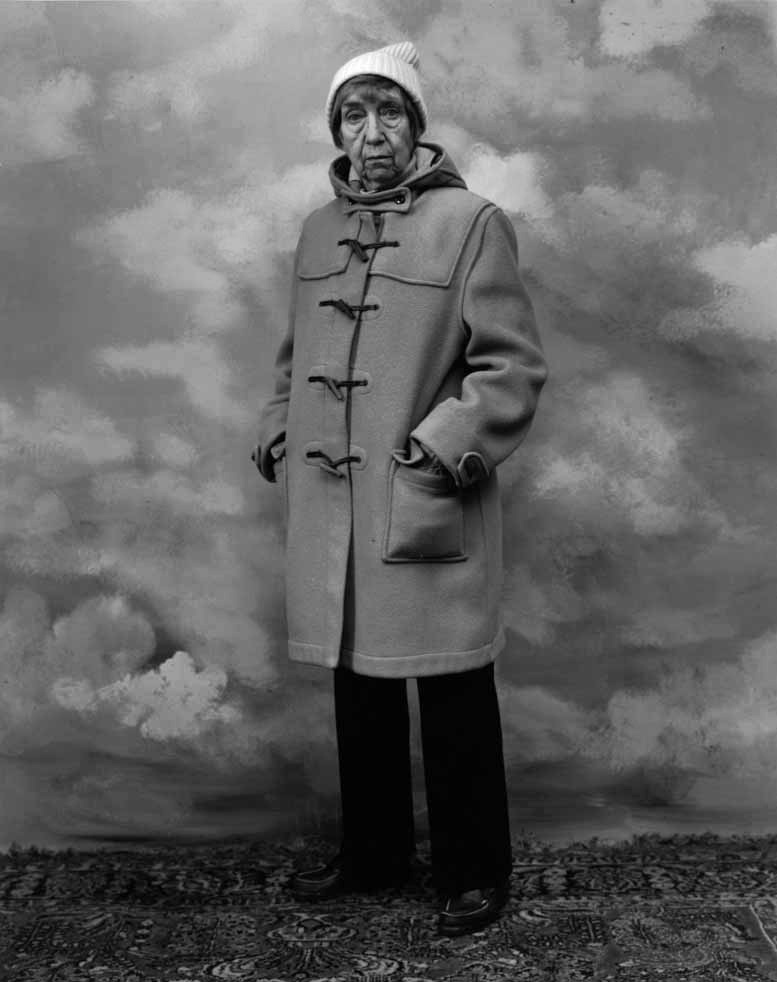
Abbott by Hank O'Neal in 1979

In 1934, Henry-Russell Hitchcock asked Abbott to photograph two subjects: antebellum architecture and the architecture of H. H. Richardson. Two decades later, Abbott and McCausland traveled US 1 from Florida to Maine, where Abbott photographed small towns and growing automobile-related architecture. The project resulted in more than 2,500 negatives.

Shortly after the trip, Abbott underwent a lung operation. She was told she should move from New York City due to air pollution. She purchased a rundown home in Blanchard, Maine along the banks of the Piscataquis River for US$1,000. Later, she moved to nearby Monson and remained in Maine until her death in 1991. Most of her work is shown in the United States, but a number of photographs are shown in Europe.

Abbott's last book was A Portrait of Maine (1968).

In 1943, Abbott was commissioned by Hudson D. Walker to photograph operations at the Red River Lumber Company in Westwood, California. Selections from her work in Westwood became part of a touring exhibition, "Lumbering and Logging in the Pine Forest of California."

== Approach to photography ==
Abbott was part of the straight photography movement, which stressed the importance of photographs being unmanipulated in both subject matter and developing processes. She also disliked the work of pictorialists who had become popular during a substantial span of her career, leaving her work without support from this school of photographers. Most of Abbott's work was influenced by what she described as her unhappy and lonely childhood. This gave her the strength and determination to follow her dreams.

Throughout her career, Abbott's photography was very much a reflection of the rise in development of technology and society. Her works documented and extolled the New York landscape. This was guided by her belief that a modern-day invention such as the camera deserved to document the 20th century. Abbott identified how photography, in particular science photography, could act as a friendly interpreter of the world to laymen and women. She accomplished this task through her photo book on Changing New York that summarized the city's modern transformation, and her science photography. Her ability to capture scientific subjects and endow them with popular appeal and scientific correctness enabled her to make physics visually comprehensible.

== Documentary style ==
The conviction that photography should act as an honest visual record of the world was at the heart of Berenice Abbott's documentary style. This idea is best illustrated by her most famous body of work, Changing New York (1935–1939). During the Great Depression, the Federal Art Project sponsored the creation of the series, which chronicled New York City's swift urban change. The human scale of city life, the consequences of modernity on the urban landscape, and the contrasts between old and new buildings were all depicted in Abbott's images. She presented her scenes with clarity and impartiality by using natural lighting, careful composition, and acute focus instead of romanticizing or dramatizing her topics.

Both her love for Eugène Atget, whose work she conserved and encouraged, and her experience as a portrait photographer informed Abbott's documentary style. Her concentration on modern realities and the aesthetic conflicts of progress, however, made her vision uniquely her own. Abbott helped to establish the documentary genre as a means of historical preservation and public involvement by showcasing via Changing New York and subsequent initiatives how documentary photography could be both artistic and socially significant.

== Scientific work ==
In addition to her photography, Abbott co-founded a company, the "House of Photography," which developed, promoted and sold photographic equipment and devices from 1947 to 1959. Abbott's inventions included a distortion enlarging easel, which created unusual effects on images, and the telescopic lighting pole, known today by many studio photographers as an "autopole", to which lights can be attached at any level. Owing to poor marketing, the House of Photography quickly lost money, and with the deaths of two designers, the company closed.

Abbott's style of straight photography helped her make important contributions to scientific photography. She once stated, "We live in a world made by science. There needs to be a friendly interpreter between science and the layman. I believe photography can be this spokesman, as no other form of expression can be."

From 1958 to 1960, she produced a series of photographs for a high-school physics textbook, developed by the Physical Science Study Committee project based at MIT to improve secondary school physics teaching. Her work included images of wave patterns in water and stroboscopic images of moving objects, such as Bouncing ball in diminishing arcs, which was featured on the cover of the textbook. She contributed to the understanding of physical laws and properties of solids and liquids though her studies of light and motion.

Between 1958 and 1961, she made a series of photographs for Educational Services Inc., which were later published. They were subsequently presented by the Smithsonian Institution in an exhibition titled Image of Physics. In 2012, some of her work from this era was displayed at the MIT Museum in Cambridge, Massachusetts.

== Personal life ==
The film Berenice Abbott: A View of the 20th Century, which showed 200 of her black and white photographs, suggests that she was a "proud proto-feminist"; someone who was ahead of her time in feminist theory. Before the film was completed she questioned, "The world doesn't like independent women, why, I don't know, but I don't care."

Despite being a lesbian, Berenice Abbott mostly kept her sexual orientation a secret, particularly in her later years. Nonetheless, she spent thirty years living with her companion, art critic Elizabeth McCausland. She gradually distanced herself from that identity, wanting to be known as a photographer, despite some accounts claiming she was openly gay in her early years.

Abbott's life and work are the subject of the 2017 novel The Realist: A Novel of Berenice Abbott, by Sarah Coleman.

The first comprehensive biography was published in 2018, Berenice Abbott: A Life in Photography by Julia Van Haaften (W. W. Norton); it was nominated for a PEN America award and a Lammy in biography, and excerpted in The Paris Review April 10, 2018.

== Works, exhibitions and collections ==
=== Notable photographs ===
- Under the El at the Battery, 1932.
- New York at Night, 1932.
- Tempo of the City I, 1938.
- James Joyce, 1928.
- Jay Street #115, New York, c.1936.
- Automat, 977 Eighth Avenue, New York, 1936.
- Radio Row, Cortland Street, Manhattan, c. 1936.
- Marie Laurencin, Paris, c.1925.
- Triboro Barber School, New York, 1935.
- The Hands of Jean Cocteau, 1927.
- Fifth Avenue Coach Company, New York, 1932.
- Edward Hopper in His Studio, 1949.
- Fifth Avenue, Nos. 4,6,8, 1936.
- Flatiron Building, Broadway and Fifth Avenue, New York City, 1938.
- Father Duffy, Times Square, 1937.
- Gunsmith and Police Department Headquarters, 1937.
- Church of God, 1936.
- Eugene Atget, 1927.
- Edna St. Vincent Millay, c.1929.
- Wall Street and Stock Exchange, 1933.
- Esso Gasoline Station, Tenth Avenue, New York, 1935.

=== Books ===
Books of photographs by Abbott

- 1939 Changing New York. New York: Dutton, 1939. With text by Elizabeth McCausland.
  - Reprint: New York in the Thirties, as Photographed by Berenice Abbott (New York: Dover, 1973).
  - Catalog raisonné edition: augmented, annotated by Bonnie Yochelson, ed., Berenice Abbott: Changing New York (New York: New Press and the Museum of the City of New York, 1997) ISBN 1-56584-377-0 /.
  - Critical edition: Miller, Sarah M. (2020). Documentary in Dispute: The Original Manuscript of Changing New York by Berenice Abbott and Elizabeth McCausland. Cambridge, MA: The MIT Press. ISBN 9780262044172. OCLC 1140683187.
- 1949 Greenwich Village: Yesterday and Today. New York: Harper, 1949. With text by Henry Wysham Lanier.
- 1968 A Portrait of Maine. New York: Macmillan, 1968. With text by Chenoweth Hall.

Other books by, or with major contributions from, Abbott

- 1930 Atget, photographe de Paris. Paris: Henri Jonquières; New York: E. Weyhe, 1930. (As photograph editor.)
- 1941 A Guide to Better Photography. New York: Crown, 1941 Revised edition: New Guide to Better Photography (New York: Crown, 1953)
- 1948 The View Camera Made Simple. Chicago: Ziff-Davis, 1948
- 1956 Twenty Photographs by Eugène Atget 1856–1927 (portfolio of silver prints by Abbott from original Atget negatives in her possession)
- 1963 A Vision of Paris: The Photographs of Eugène Atget, the Words of Marcel Proust. New York: Macmillan, 1963. Edited by Arthur D. Trottenberg
- 1964 The World of Atget. New York: Horizon, 1964. (And later editions.)
- 1964 Magnet. Cleveland: World, 1964. With text by Evans G. Valens.
- 1965 Motion. London: Longman Young, 1965. With text by Evans G. Valens
- 1968 A Portrait of Maine. NY: Macmillan, 1968. With text by Chenoweth Hall
- 1969 The Attractive Universe: Gravity and the Shape of Space. Cleveland: World, 1969. With text by Evans G. Valens
- 2008 Berenice Abbott. Germany/New York: Steidl, 2008. 2v. Edited by Hank O'Neal and Ron Kurtz. ISBN 3-86521-592-0
- 2010 Berenice Abbott". London: Thames & Hudson, 2010, Introduction by Hank O'Neal
- 2012 Berenice Abbott: Documenting Science. Göttingen: Steidl, 2012. Edited by Ron Kurtz, with introduction by Julia Van Haaften.
- 2014 The Unknown Berenice Abbott. Göttingen: Steidl, 2014. 5v. Edited by Ron Kurtz and Hank O'Neal
- 2015 Berenice Abbott: Paris Portraits. Göttingen, Germany: Steidl; New York: Commerce Graphics, 2016. Edited by Hank O'Neal

Anthologies of and/or about Abbott's works

- 1970 Berenice Abbott: Photographs. New York: Horizon, 1970; reprinted, Washington, D.C.: Smithsonian Institution Press, 1990
- 1982 O'Neal, Hank. Berenice Abbott: American Photographer. New York: McGraw-Hill, 1982. British title: Berenice Abbott: Sixty Years of Photography. London: Thames & Hudson, 1982
- 1986 Berenice Abbott, fotografie / Berenice Abbott: Photographs. Venice: Ikona, 1986
- 1989 Van Haaften, Julia, ed. Berenice Abbott, Photographer: A Modern Vision. New York: New York Public Library, 1989. [Winner, American Association of Museums' exhibition catalog design award] ISBN 0-87104-420-X
- 2009 Shimizu, Meredith Ann TeGrotenhuis. "Photography in Urban Disclosure: Berenice Abbott's Changing New York and the 1930s," Ph.D. dissertation, Northwestern University, 2009
- 2012 Morel, Gaëlle. Berenice Abbott. Paris: Éditions Hazan, 2012
- 2015 Berenice Abbott. Aperture Masters of Photography 9, by Julia Van Haaften. New York: Aperture, 1988; trilingual edition, 1997; completely revised edition, with new photos and text, 2015. [Chinese translation 2015

=== Solo exhibitions ===
- Weyhe Gallery, New York, NY, November 1930
- Photographs by Berenice Abbott at Julien Levy Gallery, New York, NY, September 26 – October 15, 1932
- New York Photographs by Berenice Abbott at Museum of the City of New York, New York, NY, October 1934 – January 1935
- New York Photographs by Berenice Abbott at Museum of Fine Arts, Springfield, MA, March 1935
- New York Photographs by Berenice Abbott at Jerome Stavola Gallery, Hartford, CT, April 1935
- New York Photographs by Berenice Abbott at Fine Arts Guild, Cambridge, MA, April 10–15, 1935
- Changing New York, Washington Circuit, Federal Art Project, traveling exhibition, 1936
- Changing New York at Museum of the City of New York City, NY, October 20, 1937 – January 3, 1938
- Changing New York at Teachers College Library, New York, NY, November 1937
- Solo exhibition at Hudson D. Walker Gallery, New York, NY, April 1938
- Changing New York at New York State Museum, Albany, NY, July 1938
- Changing New York at Federal Art Gallery, New York, NY, April 11–22, 1939
- Solo exhibition at Architectural League, New York, NY, April 1939
- Changing New York at Lawrenceville School, Lawrence Township, NJ, May 1939
- Changing New York at Photo League Gallery, New York, NY, July 1939
- Changing New York at New York State Employment Service, New York, NY, November–December 1939
- Changing New York at Walton High School, New York, NY, December 1939
- Photographs of New York by Berenice Abbott at The Cooper Union Library, New York, NY, November–December 1940
- Berenice Abbott, The Museum of Modern Art, New York, NY, December 1970 – February 1971
- Berenice Abbott: The Red River Photographs at Hudson D. Walker Gallery at the Fine Arts Work Center, Provincetown, Massachusetts, August–September 1979
- Berenice Abbott: The 20s and the 30s, International Center of Photography, New York City, November 22, 1981 – January 10, 1982
- Beauty of Physics at New York Academy of Sciences, New York, NY, January–April 1987
- Berenice Abbott, Photographer: A Modern Vision, The New York Public Library, New York NY, October 1989 – January 1990 (Traveled to Metropolitan Museum of Photography [Tokyo, Japan], Toledo [Ohio] Museum of Art, Corcoran Gallery of Art [Washington DC], and Portland [ME] Museum of Art, 1990–1992)
- Documenting New York: Photographs by Berenice Abbott, Dallas Museum of Art, Dallas, Texas,1992
- Berenice Abbott: Portraits, New York Views, and Science Photographs from the Permanent Collection, International Center of Photography, New York, NY, 1996
- Berenice Abbott's Changing New York, National Museum of Women in the Arts, Washington D.C.,1935–1939, 1998–99
- Berenice Abbott: Vintage Photographs of New York from the 1930s, Lee Gallery, Winchester, MA, September 1999
- Berenice Abbott: Science Photographs, The New York Public Library, New York NY, October 1999 – January 2000
- Berenice Abbott: All About Abbott, Howard Greenberg Gallery, New York, NY, September–November 2006
- Making Science Visible: The Photography of Berenice Abbott, The Fralin Museum of Art, Virginia, 2012
- Berenice Abbott (1898–1991), Photographs, Jeu de Paume, Paris, France, February–April 2012
- Berenice Abbott: Photography and Science: An Essential Unity, MIT Museum, Cambridge, Massachusetts, May–December 2012
- Berenice Abbott, Beetles & Huxley Gallery, London, England, October–November 2015
- Berenice Abbott – Photographs, Martin-Gropius-Bau, Berlin, Germany, January–March 2016
- Berenice Abbott's New York Album, 1929, Metropolitan Museum of Art, New York, March 2 – September 4, 2023
- Berenice Abbott: Changing New York, the San Diego Museum of Art, San Diego, December 16, 2023 – June 16, 2024
- Berenice Abbott’s Modern Lens, The Clark Art Institute, Williamstown, Mass., July 12 – October 5, 2025

=== Collections ===
Abbott's work is held in the following permanent collections:

- National Gallery of Art, Washington, DC
- New York Public Library
- Museum of the City of New York
- The Jewish Museum of New York
- New York State Museum, Albany, NY
- Smithsonian American Art Museum
- The Phillips Collection, Washington, DC
- Minneapolis Institute of Art
- Pérez Art Museum Miami, FL
- Walker Art Center, Minneapolis, MN
- Weisman Art Museum, Minneapolis
- Cleveland Museum of Art
- New Mexico Museum of Art, Santa Fe, NM
- Hunter Museum of American Art, Chattanooga, TN
- International Photography Hall of Fame, St. Louis, MO
- Rare Books and Manuscripts Library, Ohio State University libraries
- National Portrait Gallery, London, UK
- Conway Library, The Courtauld Institute of Art, London, UK
- Canadian Centre for Architecture, Montreal, Canada
- Museum of Modern Art, New York: 79 prints (as of 28 August 2023)
- Peggy Guggenheim Collection, Venice, Italy

== References and sources ==
=== Cited sources ===
- Bonnie Yochelson (1997). Berenice Abbott: Changing New York. New York: New Press. ISBN 1565845560.
