= East Branch Piscataquis River =

Location
- Country: United States

Physical characteristics
- Source
  - location: Maine
- Mouth
  - location: Piscataquis River
  - coordinates: 45°17′02″N 69°35′31″W
  - elevation: 590 feet (180 m)
- Length: 14 mi (23 km)

Basin features
- Progression: Piscataquis River – Penobscot River

The East Branch Piscataquis River is a tributary of the Piscataquis River in Piscataquis County, Maine. From its source in Little Squaw (Maine Township 3, Range 5, BKP EKR), it runs south 14 miles (23 km) to its confluence with the West Branch Piscataquis River in Blanchard to form the Piscataquis.

The Appalachian Trail crosses the East Branch just upstream from its joining with the West Branch.

== See also ==
- List of rivers of Maine
