= Sobekhotep (mayor of the Faiyum) =

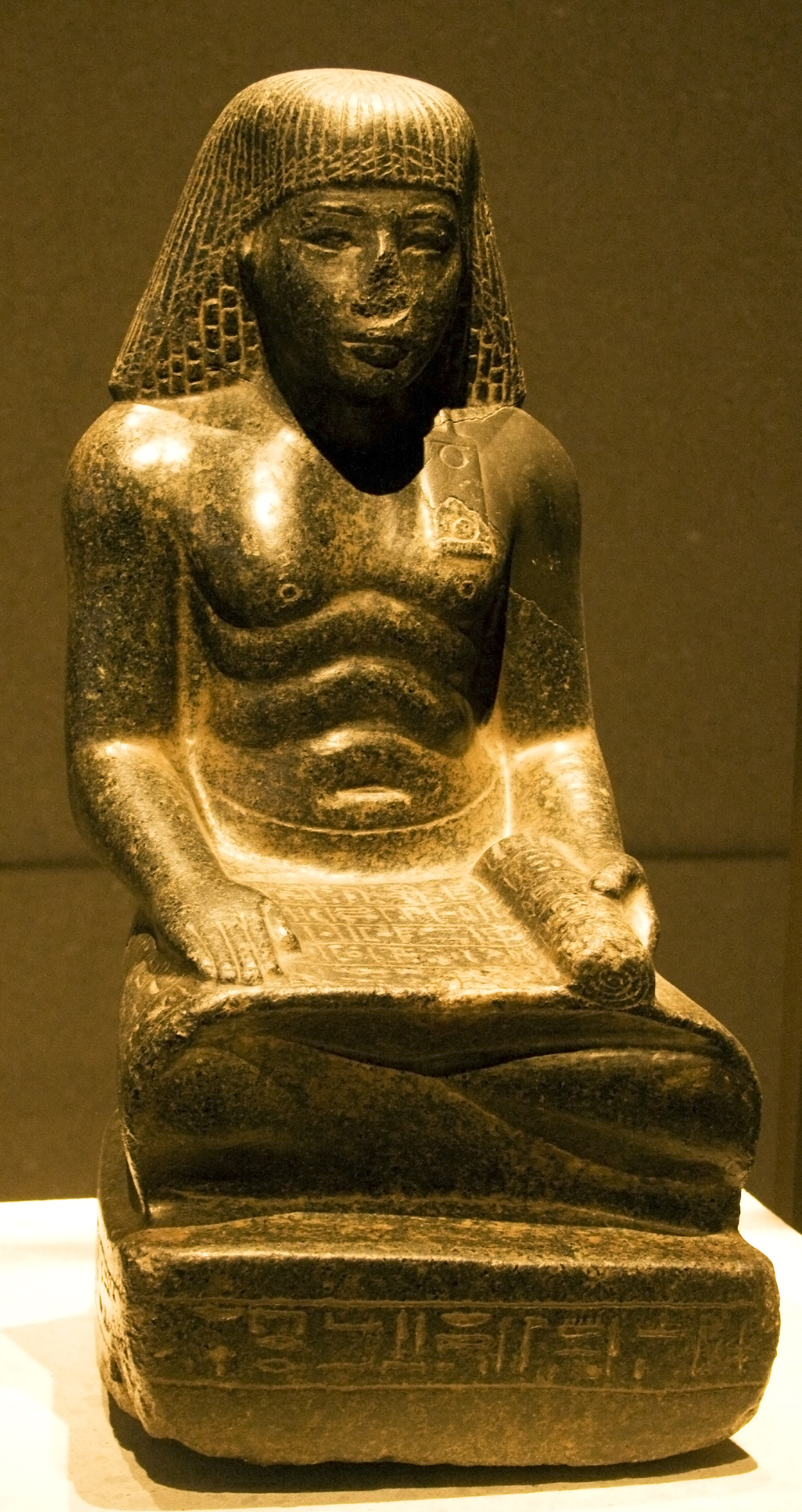
Statue of Sobekhotep

Sobekhotep was a local official of the ancient Egyptian New Kingdom under king Amenhotep II. He is known from two statues, one of them is now in Marseille (Inventory no. 208), the other one in Berlin (Inventory no. 11635). On the statues he is holding several titles in connection with the Faiyum Oasis. Most importantly he was mayor of the Faiyum Oasis. He was also overseer of the priests of Sobek, and mayor of the northern and southern lake. He was also bearing the honorific title great one of the Faiyum Oasis. Sobekhotep was also overseer of the treasury.

Sobekhotep was the son of the mayor of the Fayum Kapu. His wife or sister was a woman called Meryt. She had a daughter also called Meryt, who was married to another official called Sobekhotep, who also was mayor of Faiyum Oasis, but later was appointed to become treasurer at the royal court.

== Bibliography ==
- Bryan, Betsy (1990). "The Tomb owner and his family". In Dziobek, Eberhard; Abd El-Raziq, Mahmud (eds.). Das Grab des Sobekhotep: Theben Nr. 63. New York: von Zaber. ISBN 3805309740.
