= Sebek =

Sebek may refer to:

== People ==
- Šebek/Sebek, Czech and Slovak surname
- Sebek-khu (fl. 19th century BCE), Egyptian man honoured by the Sebek-khu Stele

== Sebek crocodilians ==
- Sebecus (genus)
- Sebecidae (subfamilia)
- Sebecia (familia)
- Sebecosuchia (suprafamilia)

== Other uses ==
- SS Sebek (1909), shipwrecked in October 1916
- Sebek, an alternative name of Sobek, a crocodilian deity of Ancient Egypt

== See also ==
- Sayabec, a municipality in Canada
- Sebec (disambiguation)
- Sobek (disambiguation)
- Xebec
- Zebec (disambiguation)
