= Sebec =

Sebec may refer to:

== Places ==
- Sebec, Maine, United States; a town located in Piscataquis County
- Sebec River, a tributary of the Piscataquis River; located in Piscataquis County, Maine, United States
- Sebec Lake, the source of the Sebec River; located in Piscataquis County, Maine, United States
- Sebec-Piscataquis River Confluence Prehistoric Archeological District, Piscataquis County, Maine, United States
- Sebec (crater), on Mars

== Transportation ==
- USS Sebec, a World War II-era United States Navy fleet oiler
- USCGC Sebec, a World War II-era United States Coast Guard cutter

== Other uses ==
- Sebec House, a residence at the University of Maine
- Saeki Electronics & Biological & Energy Corporation (SEBEC), a fictional company from the 1996 video game, Revelations: Persona

== See also ==
- Sayabec (seɪbɛk), Gaspesie, Quebec, Canada
  - Sayabec station, train station
- Sebek crocodilians
  - Sebecus (genus)
  - Sebecidae (subfamilia)
  - Sebecia (familia)
  - Sebecosuchia (suprafamilia)
- Sebek (disambiguation)
- Zebec (disambiguation)
