= Elizabeth McCausland =

American art critic, historian and writer (1899–1965)

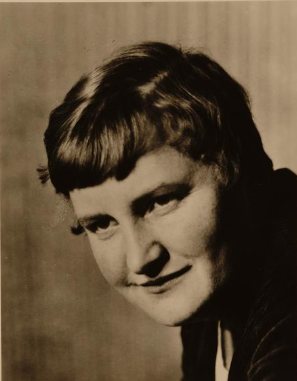
Elizabeth McCausland, ca. 1935

Elizabeth McCausland (1899–1965) was an American art critic, historian and writer.

== Early life ==
Elizabeth McCausland was born in Wichita, Kansas, on April 16, 1899.

== Career ==
A few years after graduating from Smith College (Bachelor's degree in 1920 and Master's in 1922), she began working for Springfield Sunday Union and The Springfield Republican, both newspapers based in Springfield, Massachusetts. She became deeply invested in the Sacco-Vanzetti case and eventually compiled a series of articles in a pamphlet called The Blue Menace.

She taught at Barnard College (1956), New School for Social Research (1946), Design Laboratory (1939) and Sarah Lawrence College (art history, 1942–1944).

She worked in close cooperation with the photographer Berenice Abbott on the publication of her Changing New York series in 1939. The project was sponsored by the Federal Art Project and McCausland wrote the text that accompanied Abbott's photographs.

Much of her interest in art scholarship was rooted in aspirations towards democracy and social justice. Starting from the mid-1930s, she worked as an art critic and freelance writer, contributing to Parnassus, The New Republic, and Magazine of Art. Writing primarily on Social Realist painting and photography, McCausland's reaction to the art world's turn to abstraction in the 1950s was grim, stating that she felt it "to be the artist’s flight from reality and from responsibility". Her feelings softened somewhat in later years, and she wrote that in her holistic commitment to the social aspects of art, she felt she had neglected her own emotional and poetic sides.

McCausland wrote Work for Artists in 1947, which outlined the living conditions and economic status of the American artist. She also authored works on individual artists, including Marsden Hartley, Alfred Maurer, Edward Lamson Henry, Charles W. Hawthorne and George Inness. Other books include: Careers in the Arts, Fine and Applied (1950) and Art Professions in the United States. She also wrote poetry and designed limited edition publications which she printed on her private press.

In 1939 McCausland organized the retrospective exhibition Lewis Hine at the Riverside Museum. Other exhibitions of which she was the organizer include The World of Today (Berkshire Museum, 1939), an exhibition of silk screen prints for the Springfield Museum of Fine Arts and New York State Museum (1940), and Photography Today (A.C.A. Gallery, 1944).

In 1943, she received a Guggenheim Fellowship for Humanities, US & Canada, for her study of "the status of the artist in America from colonial times to the present, with especial attention to the relation between art and patronage".

In 1944 she was appointed on the Advisory Committee of the Department of Photography of the Museum of Modern Art.

In 1950 she worked as a special consultant at the Corcoran Gallery for an American Processional exhibition and was editor of the accompanying book.

McCausland's extensive research focused particularly on E. L. Henry, Lewis Hine, George Inness, and Alfred Maurer. She spent the last fifteen years of her life researching painter Marsden Hartley.

== Personal life ==
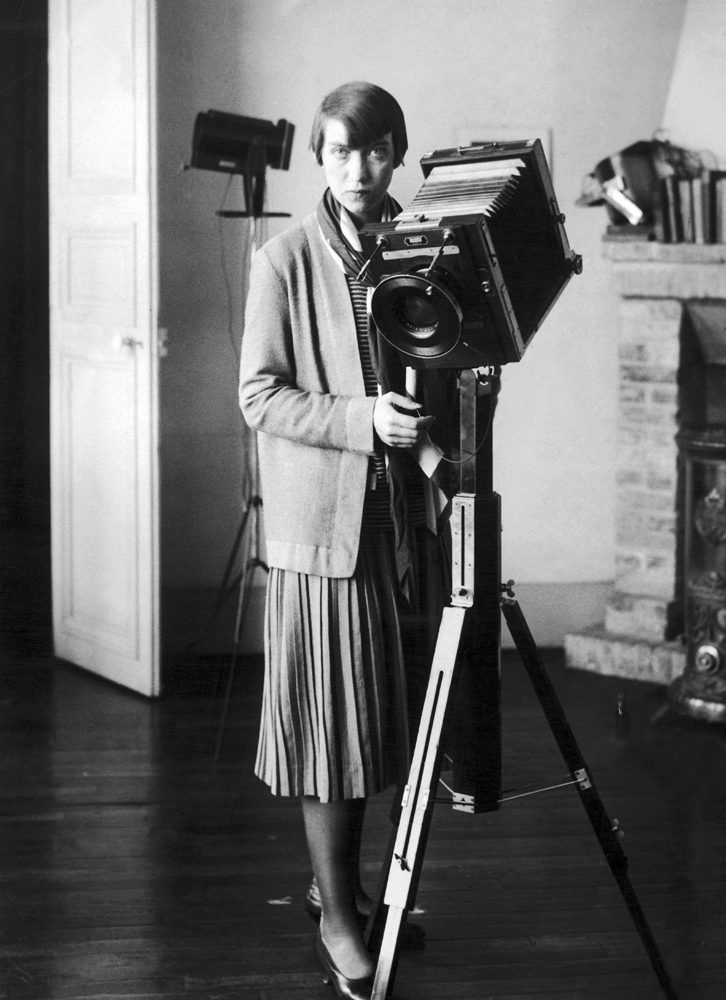
Berenice Abbott, 1930s

McCausland moved to New York City in 1935 and died there on May 14, 1965. Throughout this period she lived with her partner Berenice Abbott at 50 Commerce Street, Manhattan. After McCausland's death, Abbott moved to Maine where she died in 1991. McCausland is buried at Maple Grove Cemetery, Wichita.

McCausland also corresponded with Arthur Dove and Alfred Stieglitz, the latter of whom was a close friend.

== Legacy ==
The papers of Elizabeth McCausland are in the Archives of American Art, Smithsonian Institution.
