= Zebec =

Zebec may refer to:

- Alternate spelling of xebec, a Mediterranean sailing ship

== People with the surname ==
- Anđela Zebec, Croatian singer
- Branko Zebec (1929–1988), Croatian footballer and manager
- Mario Zebec (born 1982), Croatian soccer referee from Cestica, see List of FIFA international referees

== See also ==
- Xebec (studio), a Japanese animation studio
- Zebecke, Zala County, Hungary
- Sebec (disambiguation)
- Sebek (disambiguation)
