= Sebec River =

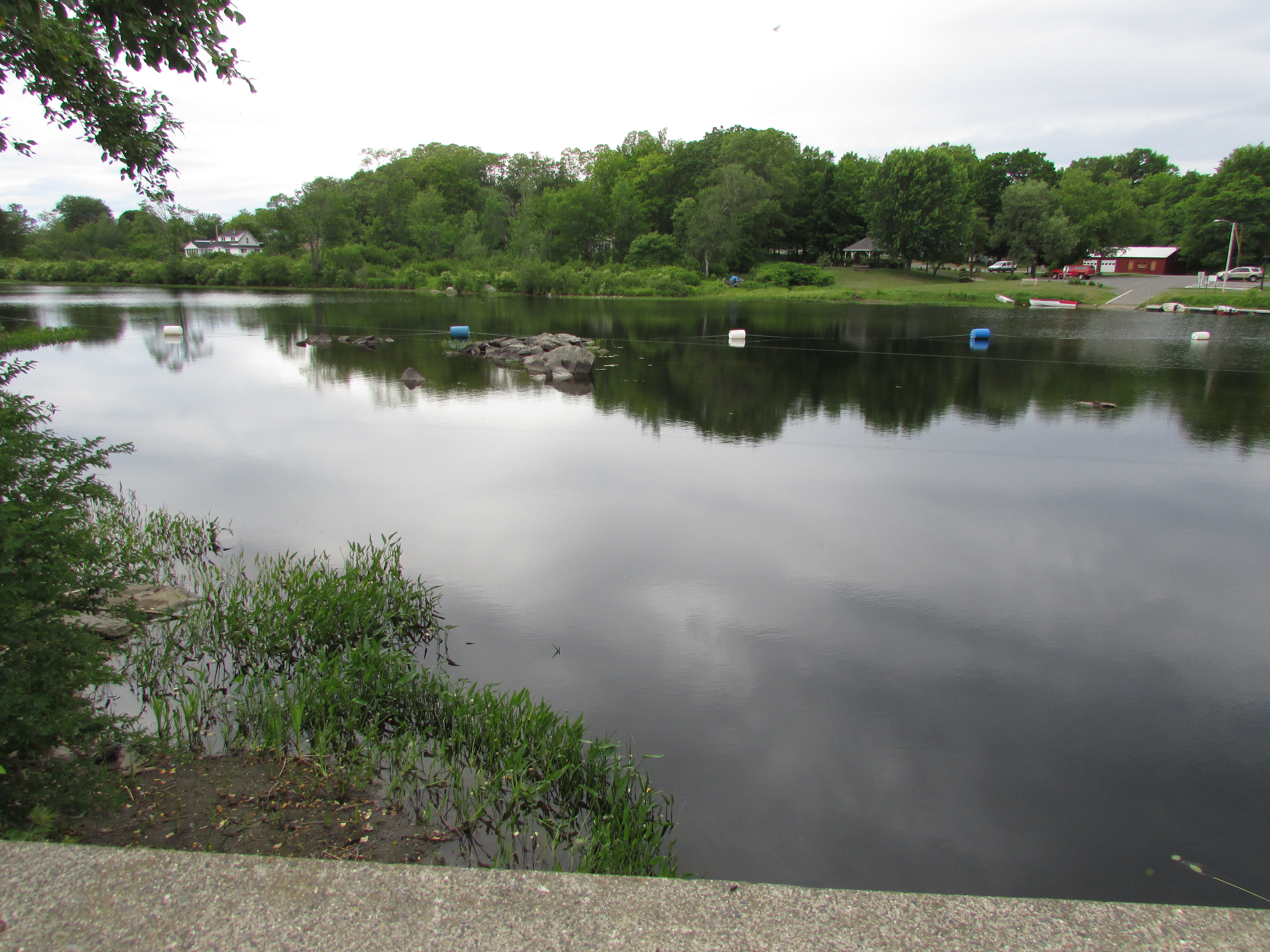
- View of the Sebec River as seen from route 11 in Milo Maine.

- Location within Maine Location within the United States

Location
- Country: United States

Physical characteristics
- Source
  - location: Maine
  - elevation: 300 feet (91 m)
- Mouth
  - location: Piscataquis River
  - coordinates: 45°14′01″N 68°57′47″W
  - elevation: 265 feet (81 m)
- Length: 10 miles (16 km)

Basin features
- Progression: Piscataquis River – Penobscot River

The Sebec River is a tributary of the Piscataquis River in Piscataquis County, Maine. From the outflow of Sebec Lake (45°16′13″N 69°06′54″W) in Sebec, the river runs 10.0 miles (16.1 km) east and southeast to its confluence with the Piscataquis in Milo.

== Sebec Lake ==
Sebec Lake
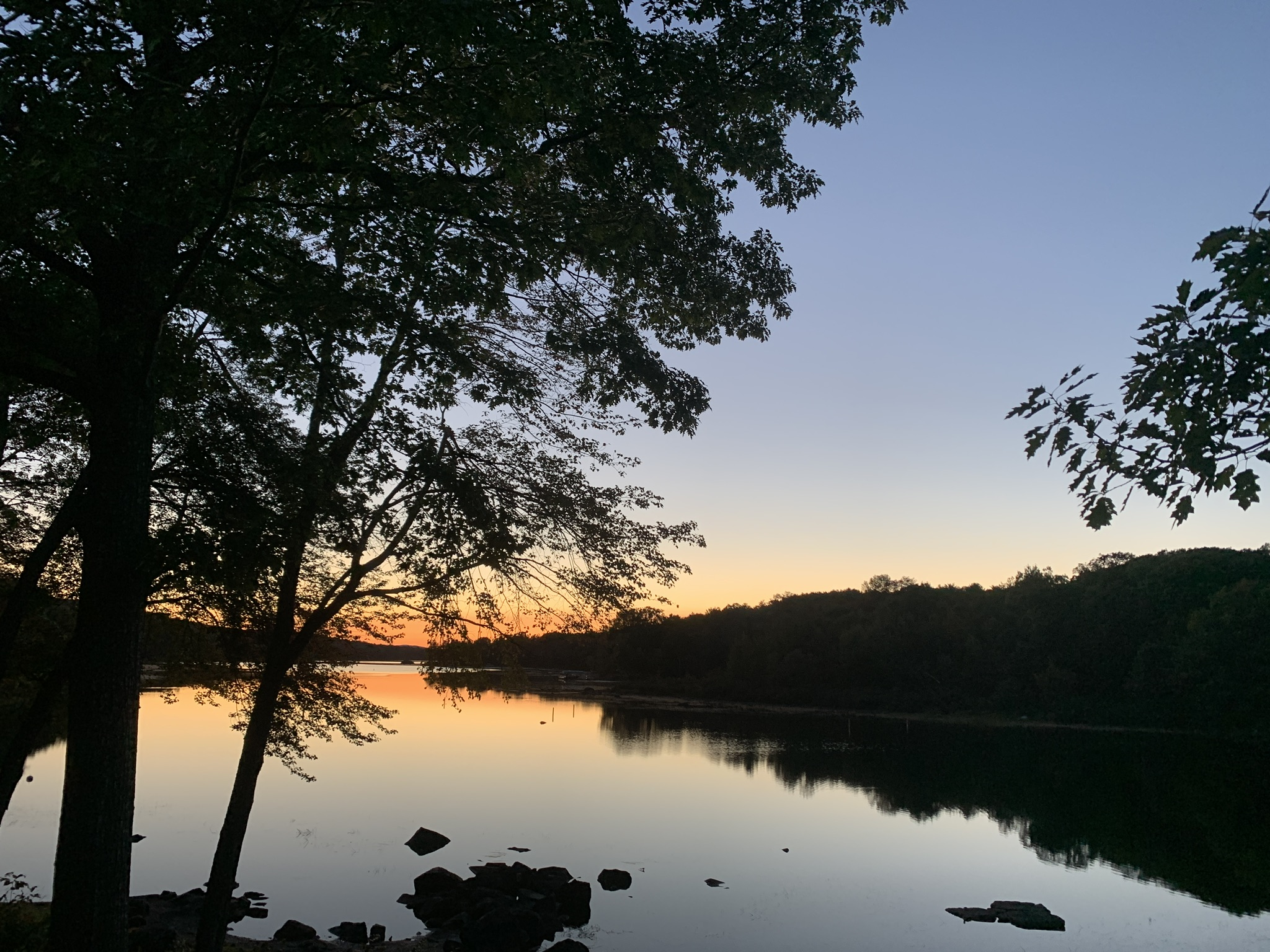
- Sebec Lake evening

- Location within Maine
- Location: Piscataquis County, Maine
- Coordinates: 45°17′N 69°18′W
- Primary outflows: Sebec River
- Max. length: 11.4 mi (18.3 km)
- Surface area: 6,362 acres (2,575 ha)
- Water volume: 283,337 acre⋅ft (349,491,000 m^{3})
- Surface elevation: 322 ft (98 m)

Sebec Lake extends westward from its overflow into Sebec River in the northern part of Sebec. The lake extends through the northeast corner of Dover-Foxcroft and covers the southwest corner of Bowerbank Township and the southeast corner of Willimantic. Minor south shore tributaries include Bog Brook and Cotton Brook in Dover-Foxcroft, and Smith Brook, Bennett Brook, Ayer Brook, and Badger Brook in Sebec. Minor north shore tributaries include Mill Brook and Grapevine Stream in Bowerbank Township and the larger Bear Brook flowing 6 miles (9.7 km) from Barnard Township. The largest tributaries are Wilson Stream and Ship Pond Stream flowing into the northwest corner of the lake in Willimantic.

== Wilson Ponds ==
Upper Wilson Pond
- Location within Maine
- Location: Piscataquis County
- Coordinates: 45°30′N 69°29′W
- Primary outflows: Lower Wilson Pond
- Max. length: 2.2 mi (3.5 km)
- Surface area: 987 acres (399 ha)
- Water volume: 13,053 acre⋅ft (16,101,000 m^{3})
- Surface elevation: 1,123 ft (342 m)

Lower Wilson Pond
- Location within Maine
- Location: Piscataquis County
- Coordinates: 45°29′N 69°31′W
- Primary inflows: Upper Wilson Pond
- Primary outflows: Big Wilson Stream
- Max. length: 2.8 mi (4.5 km)
- Surface area: 1,414 acres (572 ha)
- Water volume: 40,050 acre⋅ft (49,400,000 m^{3})
- Surface elevation: 1,122 ft (342 m)

Wilson Stream originates in Upper Wilson Pond on the western edge of Bowdoin College Grant West. Tributaries North Brook and South Brook flow into the eastern end of Upper Wilson Pond from Mountain Pond and Horseshoe Pond, respectively. The western end of Upper Wilson Pond overflows into the eastern end of Lower Wilson Pond. Lower Wilson Pond is in the eastern part of Greenville. The southern end of Lower Wilson Pond overflows into Wilson Stream. Wilson Stream flows 17 miles (27 km) south into Sebec Lake. The Appalachian Trail crosses Wilson Stream approximately 6 miles (9.7 km) south of Lower Wilson Pond. Little Wilson Stream flows 8.6 miles east from Shirley to join Wilson Stream approximately 2.5 miles (4.0 km) downstream of the Appalachian Trail crossing. Big Wilson Cliffs and Little Wilson Falls and Gorge are scenic highlights along the Appalachian Trail.

== Lake Onawa ==
Lake Onawa
- Location within Maine
- Location: Piscataquis County
- Coordinates: 45°23′N 69°23′W
- Primary inflows: Long Pond Stream
- Primary outflows: Ship Pond Stream
- Max. length: 3.4 mi (5.5 km)
- Surface area: 1,192 acres (482 ha)
- Water volume: 26,679 acre⋅ft (32,908,000 m^{3})
- Surface elevation: 537 ft (164 m)

Lake Onawa (or Ship Pond) is in the southeastern corner of Elliotville Township. Long Pond Stream flows 7 miles (11 km) south from the west end of Long Pond to reach the north end of Lake Onawa. The south end of Lake Onawa overflows into Ship Pond Stream which flows 5 miles (8.0 km) south into Sebec Lake. The International Railway of Maine was built along the south shore of Lake Onawa in 1887. One of the highest bridges on the railroad was Ship Pond Viaduct across Ship Pond Stream. The viaduct is 1,230 feet (370 m) long and passes 130 feet (40 m) above Ship Pond Stream.

== See also ==
- List of rivers of Maine
