= House R 128 =

Modernist house in Stuttgart, Germany

Coordinates: 48°45′23.33″N 9°10′27.96″E

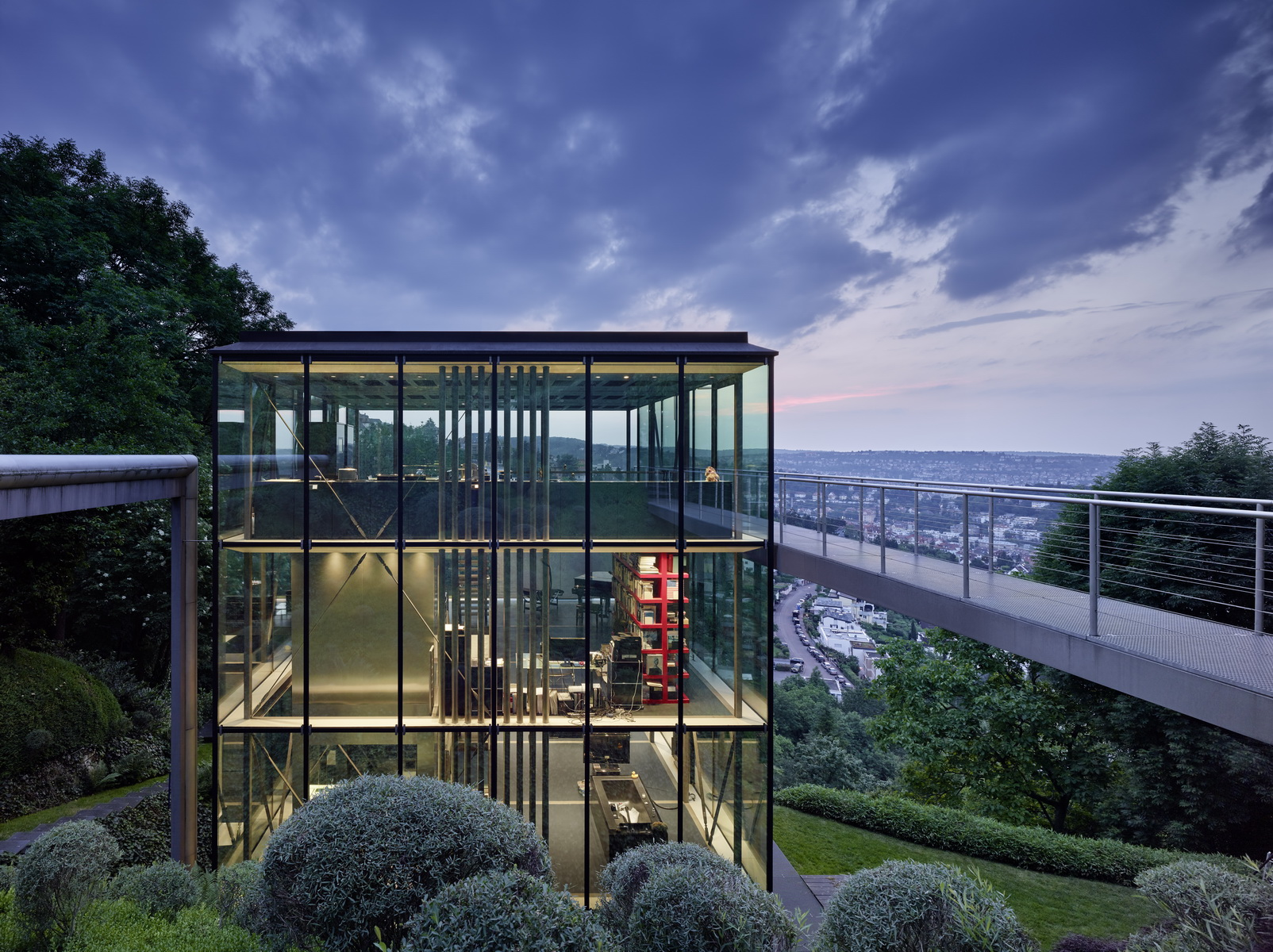
R 128 Stuttgart

House R 128 is a modernist single-family house in Stuttgart, Germany, designed by architect Werner Sobek and engineered by Werner Sobek AG in 1999/2000. The house features a modular and recyclable design, is completely glazed and has no interior dividing walls. It is computerized and meets its own energy requirements completely.

== Overview ==
The name of the house is derived from its location at Römerstrasse 128, which is a small and steep piece of land at the edge of the vale of Stuttgart. When the house was built, it was paid a great amount of attention in the architectural world. The building is shaped like a cube, has four levels and is wrapped by a glass shield. All components can be segregated for recycling. There are no walls or closed rooms (apart from the bathrooms) and only few pieces of furniture. The transparency is supposed to create the impression that one lives outdoors exposed to nature. Owing to its passive solar architecture with triple-glazed walls, the house needs no energy for heating and is a zero-emissions, zero-carbon, sustainable house. Seasonal temperature shifts are balanced by a seasonal thermal energy store. Electricity is generated by solar cells. Every item in the house is computer-controlled.
