= Werner Sobek =

German engineer and architect

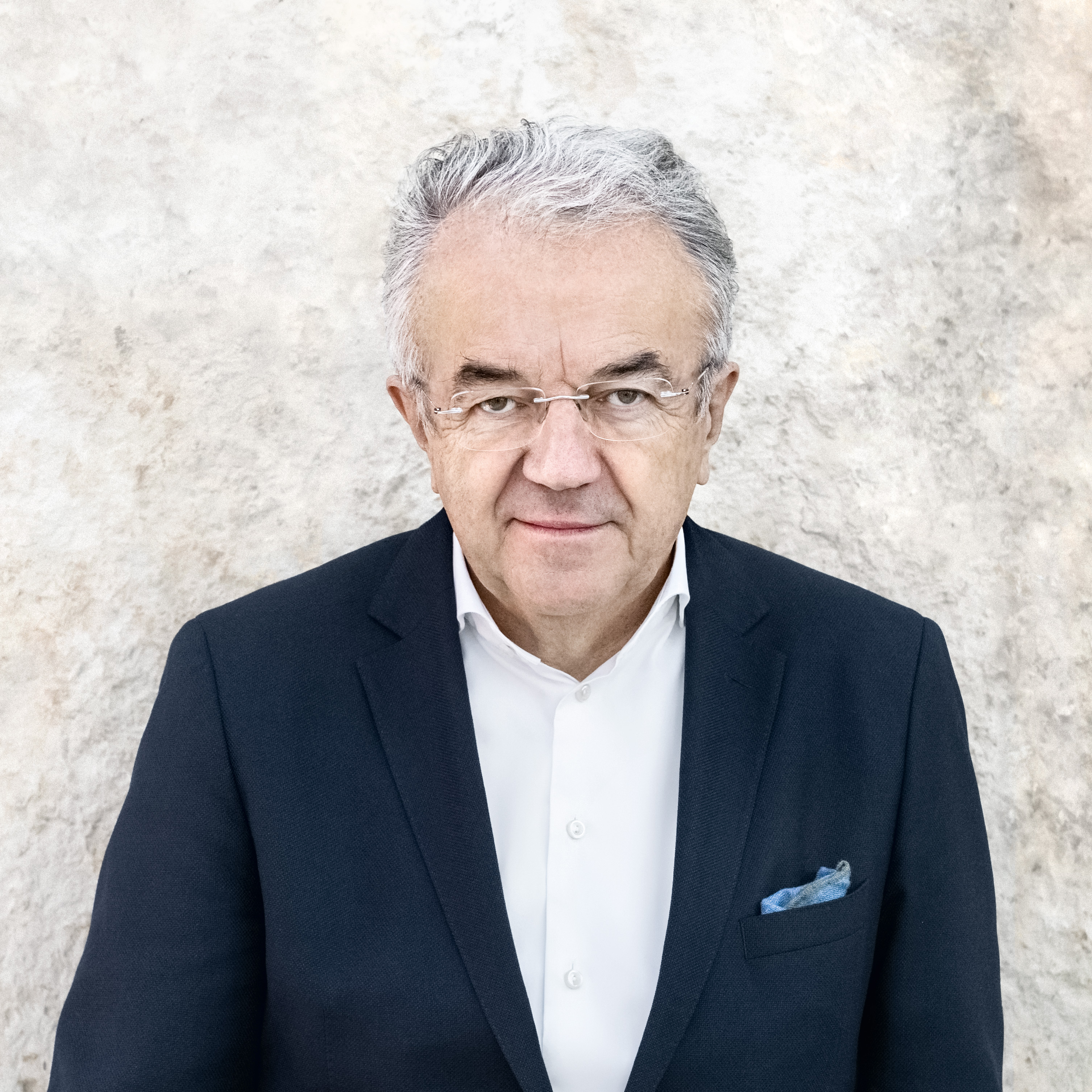
- Born: 16 May 1953 (age 72)
- Citizenship: Germany
- Occupation(s): Engineer, architect

Werner Sobek (born May 16, 1953) is a German architect and structural engineer.

== Life ==
Werner Sobek was born 1953 in Aalen, Germany. From 1974 to 1980, he studied structural engineering and architecture at the University of Stuttgart. From 1980 to 1986, he was a post-graduate fellow in the research project 'Wide-Span Lightweight Structures' at the University of Stuttgart and finished his PhD 1987 in structural engineering. In 1983, Sobek won the Fazlur Khan International Fellowship from the SOM Foundation.

In 1991, he became a professor at the Leibniz University Hannover (successor to Bernd Tokarz) and director of the Institute for Structural Design and Building Methods. In 1992 he founded his own company Werner Sobek which now has offices in Stuttgart, Frankfurt, London, Moscow, New York, and Dubai. The company has over 200 employees and works with all types of structures and materials. Its core areas of expertise are lightweight construction, high-rise construction, façade design, special constructions made from steel, glass, titanium, fabric and wood, as well as the design of sustainable buildings.

Since 1994, he has been a professor at the University of Stuttgart (successor to Frei Otto) and director of the Institute for Lightweight Structures and of the Central Laboratory for Structural Engineering. In 2000, he took over the chair of Jörg Schlaich, and fused the Institute for Lightweight Structures and the Institute for Construction and Design into the Institute for Lightweight Structures and Conceptual Design (ILEK). Both in its research and teaching, the ILEK at the University of Stuttgart unites the aspect of design that is dominant in architecture with the focus on analysis and construction from structural engineering as well as materials science. On the basis of a goal-oriented and interdisciplinary approach, the institute is concerned with the conceptual development of all types of construction and load-bearing structures, using all types of materials. The areas of focus span construction with textiles and glass all the way to new structures in reinforced and prestressed concrete. From the individual details to the whole structure, the approach focuses on the optimisation of form and construction with respect to material and energy use, durability and reliability, recyclability and environmental sustainability. The results of this work are published in the bilingual (German/English) serial from the institute (IL) or published individually in special research reports on particular topics.

In 2008 Werner Sobek was appointed Mies van der Rohe Professor at the Illinois Institute of Technology in Chicago. In recognition of his manifold academic achievements, the Technical University of Dresden awarded him an honorary doctorate in 2009.

Werner Sobek is known for his environmentally sustainable and self-sufficient prototype houses such as R 128, H16, B 10. A well-known concept study by Werner Sobek is "R-129" which uses a polyurethane skin on a carbon-fibre frame, giving it walls thinner than eggshells. His commitment to sustainability is also reflected in his involvement in the German Sustainable Building Council (DGNB, Deutsche Gesellschaft für Nachhaltiges Bauen), which he co-founders in July 2007. He was a member of the DGNB's board of directors until June 2013 and serve as its president from April 2008 to June 2010. In December 2011 he also founded the Stuttgart Institute of Sustainability (SIS), a nonprofit association aiming at the promotion of research on new sustainable building techniques.

He presented a keynote address and co-presented in the workshop Reduce CO_{2} – With technology to zero emissions at the 3rd International Holcim Forum 2010 in Mexico City and is on the Jury of the global Holcim Awards 2012. His research into lightweight structures, materials and the associated techniques and technologies is awarded a Global Award for Sustainable Architecture in 2019.

== Projects ==
- Ecole Nationale d'Art Décoratif, Limoges, France
- Interbank, Lima, Peru
- Roof over the centercourt of the Am Rothenbaum stadium, Hamburg, Germany
- Suvarnabhumi Airport, Bangkok, Thailand
- Sony Center, Berlin, Germany
- House R 128, Stuttgart, Germany
- Aktivhaus B10, Stuttgart, Germany

== Publications (selection) ==
- Sobek, Werner: Zum Entwerfen im Leichtbau. in: Bauingenieur, 70/1995, pp. 323–329.
- Schittich, C.; Staib, G.; Balkow, D.; Schuler, M.; Sobek, W.: Glasbau Atlas. Basel/Boston/Berlin: Birkhaeuser, 1998.
- Schulitz, H.C.; Sobek, W.; Habermann, K.J.: Stahlbau Atlas. Basel/Boston/Berlin: Birkhaeuser, 1999.
- Sobek, W.; Kutterer, M.; Messmer, R.: Untersuchungen zum Schubverbund bei Verbundsicherheitsglas – Ermittlung des zeit- und temperaturabhängigen Schubmoduls von PVB. in: Bauingenieur. 75/2000, Nr. 1, pp. 41–46.
- Sobek, W.; Haase, W.; Teuffel, P.: "Adaptive Systeme", Stahlbau 69(7), 2000, pp. 544–555.
- Sobek, W.: Archi-Neering – Visions of an Architecture for the 21st Century. in: Glass Processing Days. Conference Proceedings 18 to 21 June 2001, Tampere, Finland. Tampere: Tamglass Ltd. Oy, 2001, pp. 331–4.
- Sobek, W.; Sundermann, W.; Rehle, N.; Reinke, H.G.: Tragwerke für transparente Hochhäuser. in: Bauingenieur 76 (2001), pp. 326–335.
- Sobek, W.; Teuffel, P.: "Adaptive Structures in Architecture and Structural Engineering", Smart Structures and Materials (SPIE Vol. 4330): Proceedings of the SPIE 8th Annual International Symposium, 4–8 March 2001, Newport Beach, CA, USA. Liu, S. C. (ed.), Bellingham: SPIE, pp. 36–45.
- Sobek, W.; Teuffel, P.: Neue Entwicklungen im Leichtbau: Adaptive Tragwerke. in: Ingenieurbaukunst in Deutschland. Jahrbuch 2001. Hamburg: Junius, 2001.
- Sobek, W.; Teuffel, P.: "Adaptive Lightweight Structures". in: Lightweight Structures in Civil Engineering: Proceedings of the International IASS Symposium, 24–28 June 2002, Warsaw, Poland. Ed. Obrebski, J. B., Wydawnicto Naukowe: Micro Publisher, pp. 203–210.
- Sobek, Werner: Über Schachtelhalme, Türme und Hochhäuser. in: Der Traum vom Turm. Hochhäuser: Mythos – Ingenieurkunst – Baukultur. Katalog zur gleichnamigen Ausstellung im NRW-Forum Kultur und Wirtschaft Düsseldorf vom 6. November 2004 bis zum 20. Februar 2005. Ostfildern: Hatje-Cantz, 2004. pp. 42–57.
- Sobek, Werner: Glass Structures. in: The Structural Engineer, Vol. 83, Nr. 7 (5. April 2005), pp. 32–36.
- Sobek, Werner; Blandini, Lucio: Die "Glaskuppel". Prototyp einer rahmenlosen selbsttragenden Glasschale. in: Beratende Ingenieure11/12 (2005). pp. 23–28.
- Sobek, W.; Teuffel, P.; Weilandt, A.; Lemaitre, C.: "Adaptive and Lightweight", Adaptables2006, TU/e, International Conference On Adaptable Building Structures, Eindhoven The Netherlands 03-5 July 2006.
- Sobek, Werner; Hagenmayer, Stephen; Duder, Michael; Winterstetter, Thomas: Die "Highlight Munich Business Towers" in München. Tragwerksplanung und statische Nachweise. in: Bautechnik 4/2006, pp. 247–253.
- Sobek, Werner: Suvarnabhumi International Airport Bangkok – Tragwerk und Formfindung. in: Detail 7/8 (2006), pp. 818–919.
- Sobek, Werner: Gedanken zu einer Reform der Bauingenieurausbildung. in: Bauen im Aufbruch?! Schriftenreihe der Stiftung Bauwesen (vol. 11). pp. 65–73.
- Sobek, Werner: Das Mercedes-Benz Museum in Stuttgart. Die Tragwerksplanung – Komplexe Geometrie in 3-D. in: Detail 9 (2006), pp. 9801–981.
- Sobek, Werner; Kobler, Martin: Form und Gestaltung von Betonschalen. in: Beton Kalender 2007 vol. 2, pp. 1–18.
- Sobek, Werner; Straub, Wolfgang; Ploch, Jan: Teilüberdeckelung einer innerstädtischen Bundesstraße mit Spannbetonfertigteilen. in: Beton- und Stahlbetonbau 2/2007, pp. 114–119.
- Sobek, Werner; Reinke, Hans Georg; Berger, Tobias; Klein, Dietmar; Prasser, Patrick: Lufthansa Aviation Center. Die Neue Haupverwaltung in Frankfurt. in: Beratende Ingenieure 1/2 (2007), pp. 18–21.
- Sobek, Werner: Bauschaffen – auch im Sinn der Nachhaltigkeit. In: archplus 184 (Okt. 2007). pp. 88 f.
- Sobek, Werner; Laufs, Wilfried; Schmid, Angelika; Rossier, Ed: Innovative Steel Structures for Museo del Acero in Mexico. In: Structural Engineering International 1/2008. pp. 15–19.
- Sobek, Werner: Wie weiter wohnen? In: Werner Sobek & Bettina Hintze (ed.): Die besten Einfamilienhäuser – innovativ und flexibel. München: Callwey, 2008. pp. 8–13.
- Sobek, Werner; Schmid, Angelika; Heinlein, Frank: Innovative Stahltragwerke für das Museo del Acero in Mexiko. In: Stahlbau 77 (2008), vol. 8. pp. 551 – 554.
- Gertis, Karl; Hauser, Gerd; Sedlbauer, Klaus; Sobek, Werner: Was bedeutet "Platin"? Zur Entwicklung von Nachhaltigkeitsbewertungsverfahren. In: Bauphysik 30 (2008), vol. 4, pp. 244–256.
- Sobek, Werner; Trumpf, Heiko; Stork, Lena; Weidler, Nik: The Hollaenderbruecke. Economic and architecturally sophisticated design employing steel and GFRP. In: Steel Construction 1 (2008), vol. 1, pp. 34–41.
- Sobek, Werner; Schmid, Angelika; Heinlein, Frank: From Mill to Museum. In: Modern Steel Construction (June 2008). pp. 26 – 29.
- Sobek, Werner; Straub, Wolfgang; Schmid, Angelika: Horizon Serono – Konstruktion des weltweit größten zu öffnenden Glasdaches und der darunterliegenden Forumfassade. In: Stahlbau 78 (2009), vol. 1. pp. 1 – 10.
- Sobek, Werner: Engineered Glass. In: Michael Bell & Jeannie Kim (ed.): Engineered Transparency – The Technical, Visual, and Spatial Effects of Glass. New York: Princeton Architectural Press, 2009. pp. 169–82.
- Sobek, Werner; Sedlbauer, Klaus; Schuster, Heide: Sustainable Building. In: Bullinger, Hans-Jörg (ed.): Technology Guide. Principles – Applications – Trends. Heidelberg: Springer, 2009. pp. 432–435.
- Sobek, Werner: Vom Institut für Massivbau zum Institut für Leichtbau Entwerfen und Konstruieren. Das Institut nach der Emeritierung von Fritz Leonhardt. In: Joachim Kleinmanns & Christiane Weber (ed.): Fritz Leonhardt 1909–1999. Die Kunst des Konstruierens. The Art of Engineering. Stuttgart: Axel Menges, 2009. pp. 160 – 163.
- Sobek, Werner: Das Deutsche Gütesiegel Nachhaltiges Bauen – ein neues Instrument zur Planung und Zertifizierung von Nachhaltigkeit. In: VDI Annual Edition 2009/2010 of Bauingenieur (vol. 84, September 2009). pp. 90–91.
- Sobek, Werner; Tarazi, Frank: Ein weiterer Schritt hin zur entmaterialisierten Gebäudehülle – das Neue Verwaltungsgebäude der Europäischen Investititionsbank in Luxemburg. In: Bauingenieur vol. 85 (January 2010), pp. 29–35.
- Sobek, Werner; Hinz, Holger: Der Neubau des Emil-Schumacher-Museums in Hagen. In: Stahlbau Spezial 2010 – Konstruktiver Glasbau. pp. 30–33.
- Sobek, Werner: Wie weiter Bauen? Editorial. In: Beton- und Stahlbetonbau 105 (2010), vol. 4, p. 205.
- Sobek, Werner; Hinz, Holger; Sundermann, Wolfgang: Die Sanaya Towers in Amman. Eine tragwerksplanerische Herausforderung. In: Beton- und Stahlbetonbau 105 (2010), vol. 4, pp. 244–247.
- Sobek, Werner; Trumpf, Heiko; Heinlein, Frank: Recyclinggerechtes Konstruieren im Stahlbau. In: Stahlbau 79 (2010), vol. 6. pp. 424 – 433.

== Awards ==
- Fazlur Khan Award of the SOM (Skidmore, Owings and Merrill) Foundation
- Hubert-Rüsch-Preis of the Deutschen Betonvereins
- DuPont Benedictus Award
- Industrial Fabrics Association International (IFAI) Design Award
- European Glulam Award
- Fritz Schumacher Award of the Alfred Toepfer Stiftung F.V.S.
- Building of the Year Award, Hamburg
- Innovation Award "Architecture and Presentation"
- Hugo Haering Award of the BDA (Association of German Architects)
- Oscar Faber Award der Institution of Structural Engineers, London (2006)
- Auguste Perret Prize of the UIA- Union Internationale des Architectes
- The Fazlur Khan Lifetime Achievement Medal of the CTBUH - Council on Tall Buildings and Urban Habitat
- Prix Acier 2009 Stahlbau Zentrum Schweiz
- Médaille de la Recherche et de la Technique 2010 of the French Académie d’Architecture
- German Solar Award 2012
- Order of Merit of the State of Baden-Württemberg (20 April 2013)
- Nike 2013 (BDA Architecture Award) (21 June 2013)
- Tsuboi Award of the IASS (International Association for Shell and Spatial Structures) (23 September 2013)
- Global Award for Sustainable Architecture (13 May 2019)

== Exhibitions ==
- 05/2010 – 06/2010 "Sketches for the Future. Werner Sobek and the ILEK" (Architecture Biennale 2010, Moscow/Russia)
- 03/2010 – 05/2010 "Designing the Future" (Goethe Institute La Paz and other sites in Bolivia (travelling exhibition))
- 11/2009 – 12/2009 "Skizzen für die Zukunft. Werner Sobek und das ILEK" (FH Kärnten, Spittal/Austria)
- 06/2009 – 09/2009 "Skizzen für die Zukunft. Werner Sobek und das ILEK" (Ringturm Gallery, Vienna/Austria)
- 05/2009 – 06/2010 "Designing the Future" (Goethe Institute Jakarta and other sites in Indonesia (travelling exhibition))
- 02/2005 "Merging Architecture and Engineering - Lightweight, Adaptivity and Transparency" (American University in Cairo/Egypt)
- 09/2004 – 11/2004 "Sobek und Seele – Glasfassaden mit hoher Performance" (Architekturmuseum Schwaben, Augsburg/Germany)
- 05/2004 – 08/2004 "show me the future – wege in die zukunft" (Pinakothek der Moderne, Munich/Germany)
- 11/2003 – 11/2004 "Beyond Materiality – China Tour" (Peking, Houa Zhong Keij, Beifang Jidaoda, Suzhou, Zhejiang, Fuzhou, Kanton, Shenzhen)
- 11/2003 "Beyond Materiality" (Tokyo Trade Fair/Japan)
- 09/2002 – 10/2002 "Beyond Materiality" (Aedes Gallery East, Berlin/Germany)
- 06/1999 – 11/1999 "Archi-neering" (Municipal Museum Leverkusen/Germany)
