= Piscataquis River =

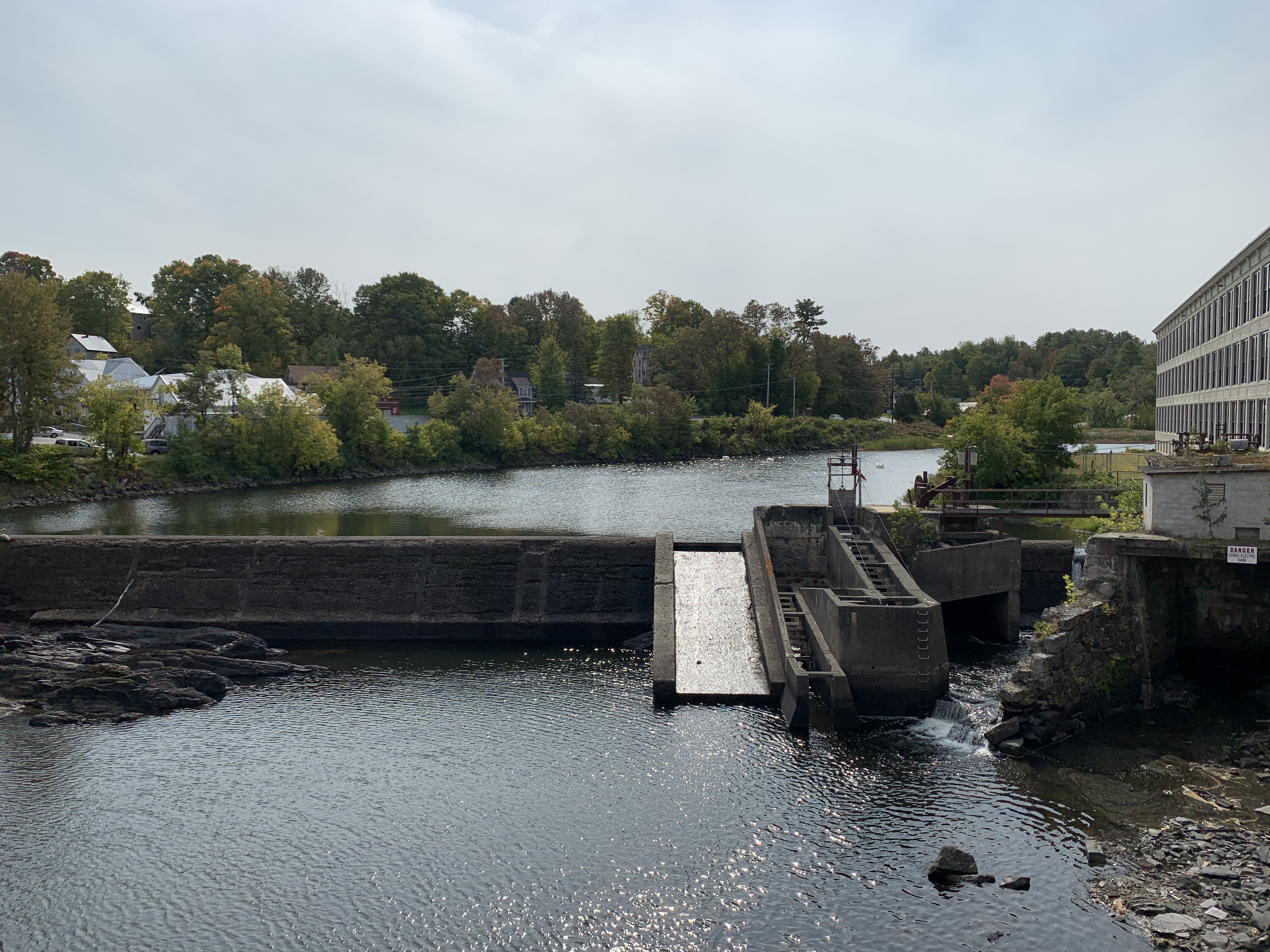
- Piscataquis River in Dover-Foxcroft, Maine

Location
- Country: United States

Physical characteristics
- Source
  - location: Maine
  - elevation: 590 feet (180 m)
- Mouth
  - location: Penobscot River
  - coordinates: 45°14′20″N 68°39′22″W
  - elevation: 130 feet (40 m)
- Length: about 62 miles (100 km)

Basin features
- Tributaries
  - left: East Branch Piscataquis River, Sebec River, Pleasant River
  - right: West Branch Piscataquis River

The Piscataquis River (/pɪˈskætəkwɪs/) is a major tributary of the Penobscot River, found in Piscataquis County, Maine, United States. It starts from the confluence of its East Branch and West Branch (45°16′54″N 69°35′24″W) in Blanchard. The river flows in a mostly eastern direction until it meets the Penobscot at Howland. It is approximately 65 miles (105 km) in length.

The United States government maintains three river flow gauges on the Piscataquis river. The first is at Blanchard (45°16′02″N 69°35′03″W) where the rivershed is 118 square miles (306 km^{2}). Flow here has ranged from 7,550 to 4.8 cubic feet per second (213.79 to 0.14 m^{3}/s). The second is near Dover-Foxcroft, Maine (45°10′31″N 69°18′55″W) where the rivershed is 298 square miles (772 km^{2}). Flow here has ranged from 37,300 to 5 cubic feet (1,056.22 to 0.14 m^{3}) per second. The third is in Medford, Maine (45°15′40″N 68°52′07″W) where the rivershed is 1,162 square miles (3,010 km^{2}). The flow here has ranged from 60,100 to 66 cubic feet (1,701.8 to 1.9 m^{3}) per second.

The Appalachian Trail runs along the West Branch of the Piscataquis, crossing the East Branch just upstream from their joining. The river is impounded by the Howland Dam at its confluence with the Penobscot River.
