= Blanchard, Maine =

- Unorganized territory
- Location in Piscataquis County and the state of Maine.
- Coordinates: 45°16′03″N 69°35′01″W
- Country: United States
- State: Maine
- County: Piscataquis

Area
  - Total: 45.0 sq mi (116.5 km^{2})
  - Land: 44.3 sq mi (114.8 km^{2})
  - Water: 0.66 sq mi (1.7 km^{2})
- Elevation: 1,122 ft (342 m)

Population (2020)
  - Total: 91
  - Density: 2.1/sq mi (0.79/km^{2})
- Time zone: UTC-5 (Eastern (EST))
  - Summer (DST): UTC-4 (EDT)
- ZIP code: 04406
- Area code: 207
- FIPS code: 23-05560
- GNIS feature ID: 2378258

Blanchard is an unorganized territory (township) in Piscataquis County, Maine, United States. The population was 91 at the 2020 census.

== Geography ==
According to the United States Census Bureau, the unorganized territory has a total area of 45.0 square miles (116.5 km^{2}), of which 44.3 square miles (114.8 km^{2}) is land and 0.7 square mile (1.7 km^{2}) (1.47%) is water.

=== Climate ===
This climatic region is typified by large seasonal temperature differences, with warm to hot (and often humid) summers and cold (sometimes severely cold) winters. According to the Köppen Climate Classification system, Blanchard has a humid continental climate, abbreviated "Dfb" on climate maps.

== Demographics ==
Historical population
Census	Pop.	Note	%±
1840	270		—
1850	192		−28.9%
1860	164		−14.6%
1870	164		0.0%
1880	167		1.8%
1890	213		27.5%
1900	248		16.4%
1910	175		−29.4%
1920	124		−29.1%
1930	104		−16.1%
1940	118		13.5%
1950	75		−36.4%
1960	57		−24.0%
1970	56		−1.8%
1980	64		14.3%
1990	78		21.9%
2000	83		6.4%
2010	98		18.1%
2020	91		−7.1%
U.S. Decennial Census

As of the census of 2000, there were 83 people, 42 households, and 23 families residing in the unorganized territory. The population density was 1.9 inhabitants per square mile (0.73/km^{2}). There were 148 housing units at an average density of 3.3 per square mile (1.3/km^{2}). The racial makeup of the unorganized territory was 98.80% White, and 1.20% from two or more races.

There were 42 households, out of which 21.4% had children under the age of 18 living with them, 52.4% were married couples living together, 2.4% had a female householder with no husband present, and 42.9% were non-families. 42.9% of all households were made up of individuals, and 9.5% had someone living alone who was 65 years of age or older. The average household size was 1.98 and the average family size was 2.71.

In the unorganized territory the population was spread out, with 20.5% under the age of 18, 3.6% from 18 to 24, 27.7% from 25 to 44, 37.3% from 45 to 64, and 10.8% who were 65 years of age or older. The median age was 45 years. For every 100 females, there were 124.3 males. For every 100 females age 18 and over, there were 112.9 males.

The median income for a household in the unorganized territory was $13,250, and the median income for a family was $45,625. Males had a median income of $25,625 versus $27,500 for females. The per capita income for the unorganized territory was $12,571. There were 15.8% of families and 33.3% of the population living below the poverty line, including 26.7% of under eighteens and 22.2% of those over 64.

== Education ==
The Maine Department of Education is responsible for coordinating school assignments in the unorganized territory. As of 2025, it assigns Blanchard to Milo Elementary School and Penquis Valley Middle/High School, both operated by Maine School Administrative District 41, which is a part of Alternative Organizational System 3.

== Notable people ==
- Berenice Abbott, former photographer
- Thomas Davee, former U.S. Congressman and Maine State Senator
