= Monson, Maine =

Town in Maine, United States

- Town
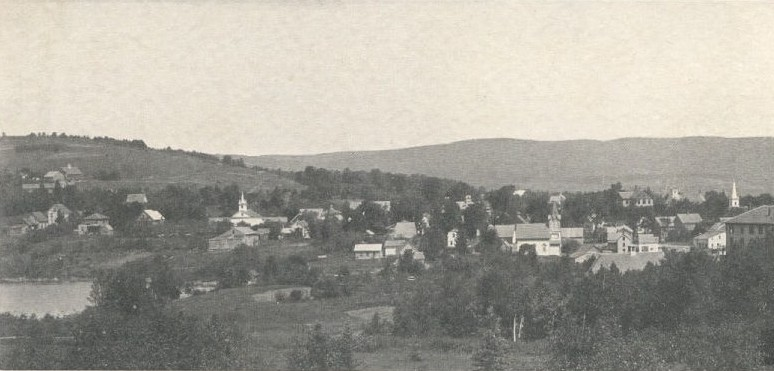
- Monson Village, c. 1905

- Seal Logo
- Motto: By the Shores of Lake Hebron
- Location in Piscataquis County and the state of Maine.
- Coordinates: 45°17′11″N 69°30′21″W
- Country: United States
- State: Maine
- County: Piscataquis

Area
  - Total: 49.10 sq mi (127.17 km^{2})
  - Land: 46.78 sq mi (121.16 km^{2})
  - Water: 2.32 sq mi (6.01 km^{2})
- Elevation: 896 ft (273 m)

Population (2020)
  - Total: 609
  - Density: 13/sq mi (5/km^{2})
- Time zone: UTC-5 (Eastern (EST))
  - Summer (DST): UTC-4 (EDT)
- ZIP code: 04464
- Area code: 207
- FIPS code: 23-46580
- GNIS feature ID: 0582603
- Website: monsonmaine.org

Monson is a town in Piscataquis County, Maine, United States. The population was 609 at the 2020 census. The town is located on Route 15 which is a significant route north into the well known Moosehead Lake Region, to which Monson can be considered a gateway. This route eventually leads to the Canadian Province of Quebec.

The town is well known in local and state history, and contributions by the town and its location are notable. It is the last town located on the Appalachian Trail at the beginning (or end) of the Hundred-Mile Wilderness. It is not uncommon to see many hikers in town resting before (or after) their trip into the Wilderness, and several lodging places in town cater directly to these hikers.

== History ==
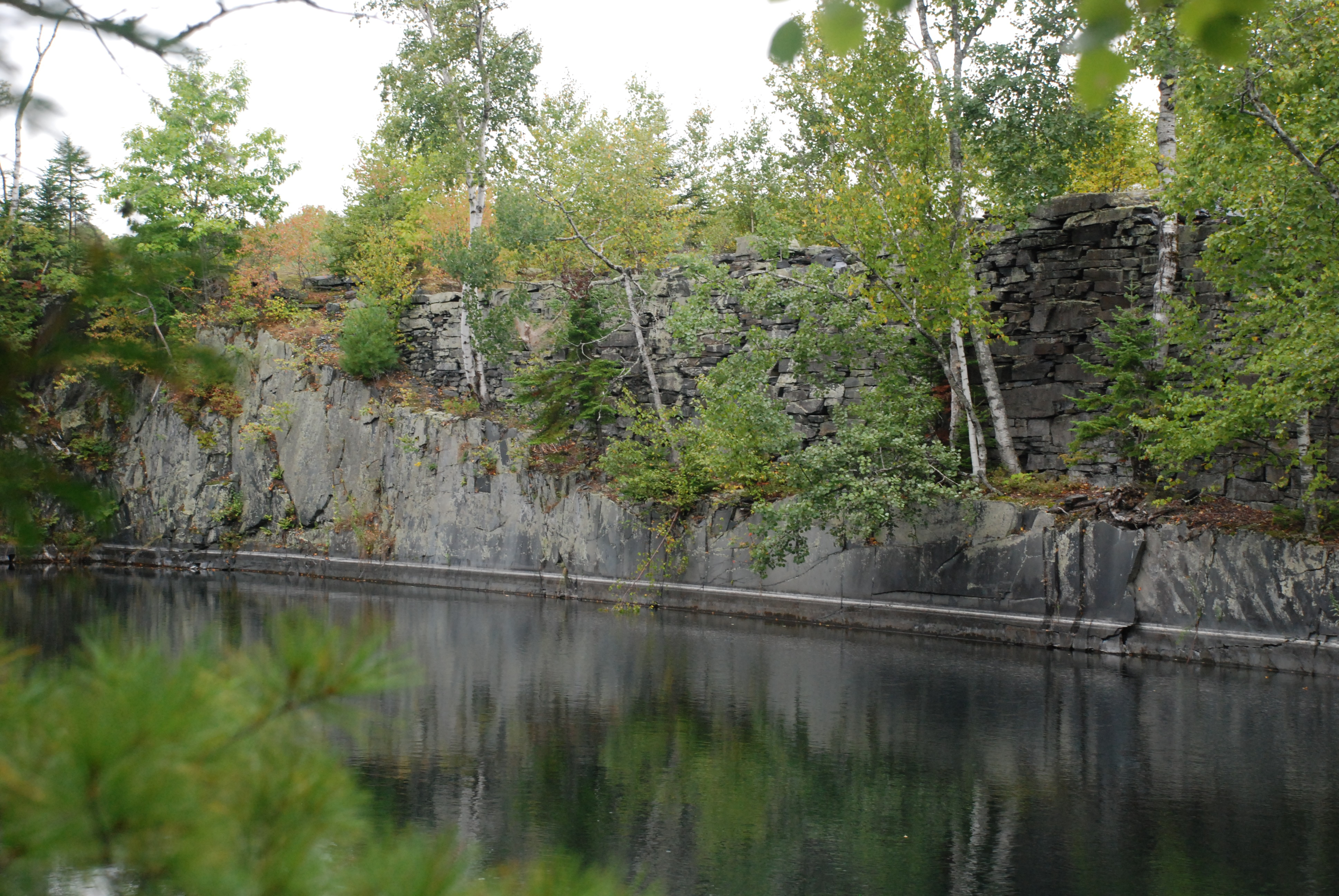
Flooded slate quarry at Monson.

Monson was founded on February 8, 1822, by an act of the state legislature. It was named after Monson, Massachusetts. Previously the town was part of a piece of land granted to both Hebron Academy and Monson Academy by the state of Massachusetts in 1811. On April 22, 1822, the town had its first town meeting to form a government. However, the first settler came here in 1816 after being here the previous fall to clear trees out for a settlement. Monson is also referenced in the book The Maine Woods by Henry David Thoreau, wherein a drawing of moose antlers depicting the direction and names of both Blanchard and Monson, and the town is mentioned in other sections of the book. The antlers have been stolen and replaced several times, but currently they exist in the approximate location on a pole after leaving the town of Abbot.

In 1870, slate was discovered by a resident who had immigrated from Wales, while driving his horse in the countryside of the town. Over the next few decades, many slate quarries were created, increasing the population of the town, as well as generating a source of income for residents. Large-scale slate operations required construction of the Monson Railroad in 1883; and 2 ft (610 mm) gauge locomotives transported slate and passengers to the larger Bangor and Aroostook Railroad in Abbot until 1943. The slate industry began to decline after World War I and most of the operations effectively ended. The Sheldon Slate Product Company was operating in Monson in the 1990s, while the Monson Maine Slate Co. and Kennedy Slate Co. continued in the 2000s The headstone of John F. Kennedy's grave in Arlington National Cemetery is made from Monson slate.

In 1945, after a fire at Greenville's Moosehead Woodcrafters resulted in the company buying a former slate company's buildings that created Moosehead Manufacturing, which produced furniture products for over 60 years until its closure in 2007. The company had a sister plant located in Dover-Foxcroft, and a store in North Carolina, and shipped its products all over the state, country, and even as far away as Japan and other countries. The operation created many jobs for several generations, and it was not uncommon that fathers and sons, as well as mothers and daughters, would work together. The town was greatly impacted by the revenue and income generated by the company, and had as many as 250 workers who lived either in town or in several communities around the town.

Throughout its history, Monson has been greatly surpassed by its neighbors to the north by means of tourism. The town had a hotel, and even a steamboat that took people on trips on Lake Hebron in the late 19th century and early 20th century, but due to several causes, the hotel and many of the local businesses dealing with tourism in the early 20th century went into decline. Since the 1990s, Monson has increased again in tourism and, with the closure of Moosehead Manufacturing, many consider Monson (as well as much of Piscataquis County), to cater towards tourism. This is evidenced in the rise of antique shops, a new pub and lodging, and several similar businesses increasing on Main Street.

In late 2016, the Libra Foundation, one of the largest charitable organizations in Maine, purchased 30 buildings in downtown Monson and poured $10 million into reviving it. The foundation opened a general store stocked with goods from their other major project, Pineland Farms, and helped start The Quarry restaurant, which received a James Beard Award for Hospitality in 2023. In the summer of 2018, the foundation launched Monson Arts in partnership with Stuart Kestenbaum, the Poet Laureate of Maine at the time. Monson Arts hosts artist residencies and conducts workshops, talks, and exhibits for the general public and local high school students.

== Geography ==
According to the United States Census Bureau, the town has a total area of 49.10 square miles (127.17 km^{2}), of which 46.78 square miles (121.16 km^{2}) is land and 2.32 square miles (6.01 km^{2}) is water.

== Demographics ==
Historical population
Census	Pop.	Note	%±
1830	411		—
1840	548		33.3%
1850	654		19.3%
1860	708		8.3%
1870	604		−14.7%
1880	827		36.9%
1890	1,237		49.6%
1900	1,116		−9.8%
1910	1,243		11.4%
1920	1,079		−13.2%
1930	1,181		9.5%
1940	977		−17.3%
1950	855		−12.5%
1960	852		−0.4%
1970	669		−21.5%
1980	804		20.2%
1990	744		−7.5%
2000	666		−10.5%
2010	686		3.0%
2020	609		−11.2%
U.S. Decennial Census

=== 2010 census ===
As of the census of 2010, there were 686 people, 308 households, and 185 families residing in the town. The population density was 14.7 inhabitants per square mile (5.7/km^{2}). There were 595 housing units at an average density of 12.7 per square mile (4.9/km^{2}). The racial makeup of the town was 96.8% White, 0.3% African American, 0.6% Native American, 0.1% Asian, 0.1% from other races, and 2.0% from two or more races. Hispanic or Latino of any race were 1.2% of the population.

There were 308 households, of which 20.5% had children under the age of 18 living with them, 51.6% were married couples living together, 5.2% had a female householder with no husband present, 3.2% had a male householder with no wife present, and 39.9% were non-families. 33.1% of all households were made up of individuals, and 12.7% had someone living alone who was 65 years of age or older. The average household size was 2.23 and the average family size was 2.85.

The median age in the town was 50.4 years. 19.1% of residents were under the age of 18; 4.8% were between the ages of 18 and 24; 16% were from 25 to 44; 40.4% were from 45 to 64; and 19.7% were 65 years of age or older. The gender makeup of the town was 52.9% male and 47.1% female.

== Education ==
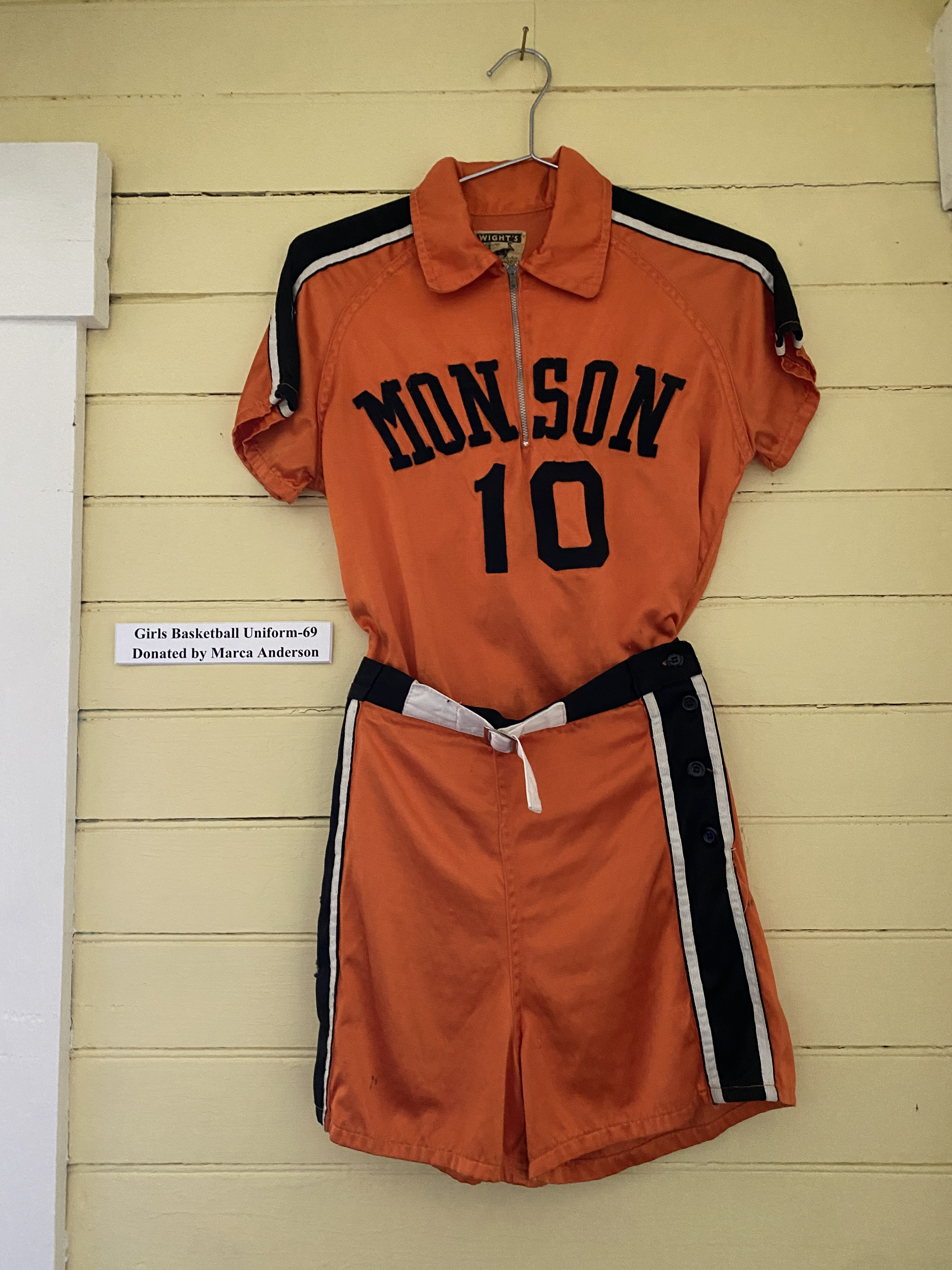
Girls basketball uniform, donated to the Monson Historical Society.

Monson had a primary and secondary school known as Monson Academy. Although the school had begun classes in 1847, a longer-lasting building did not succeed (due to fires) until 1861. The school remained in session till 1968 when the buildings were remodeled and 7th through 12th grades began to be bussed to Dover-Foxcroft. Graduates from Foxcroft Academy are essentially graduates from Monson Academy, however no degree or ceremony is given for these graduates. There is also a small but remaining Monson Academy Alumni that consists mostly of people born between 1920 and 1950. The Academy also had won state basketball tournaments in the 1950s and 1960s and many of the trophies and other memorabilia from the school are held within the Monson Museum, and can be viewed. The school team was known as the Slaters and their colors were orange and black. A plaque near the original site of Monson Academy is also located near the entrance to the Monson Community Center.

Monson Elementary began operations in the 1980s and an extension was created in the 1990s that added room for a new library and school rooms. By 2009, the student population was lower than before. Due to a ruling by the MSAD 68 Board of Directors, a referendum was set up on May 12, 2009 on whether the school should stay open. Residents of the town decided to close Monson Elementary after the 2008–2009 school year. Currently, all publicly educated students that reside in Monson are educated through MSAD 68. Pre-school, elementary and middle school students attend school at SeDoMoCha and high school students at Foxcroft Academy. There had been an effort to reorganize the school's partnerships with either Union 60 in Greenville or MSAD 4 in Guilford. The former school briefly became a community center, and in 2017 was purchased by the Libra Foundation with the vision that it become an artists' space. The gymnasium remains town property and is used for craft fairs, an annual American Legion yard sale and other private/public events. The band stand on the property is still occasionally used, while the outdoor tennis and basketball courts have fallen into disrepair.

== Notable people ==
- Berenice Abbott, American photographer known for her black-and-white photography of New York City architecture and urban design of the 1930s
- Mary Louise Graffam, Teacher, high school principal, Christian missionary, and an important witness to the Armenian genocide
- Levi William Humphrey, Progressive party member of the Canadian House of Commons
- George Pullen Jackson, American educator, musicologist and pioneer in the field of Southern hymnody
- Carl Sprinchorn, Swedish-born American Ashcan School painter
- Ben H. Williams, American labor leader known for his work in the Industrial Workers of the World and as editor of Solidarity
