= Julia Bouwsma =

American poet, educator, and librarian

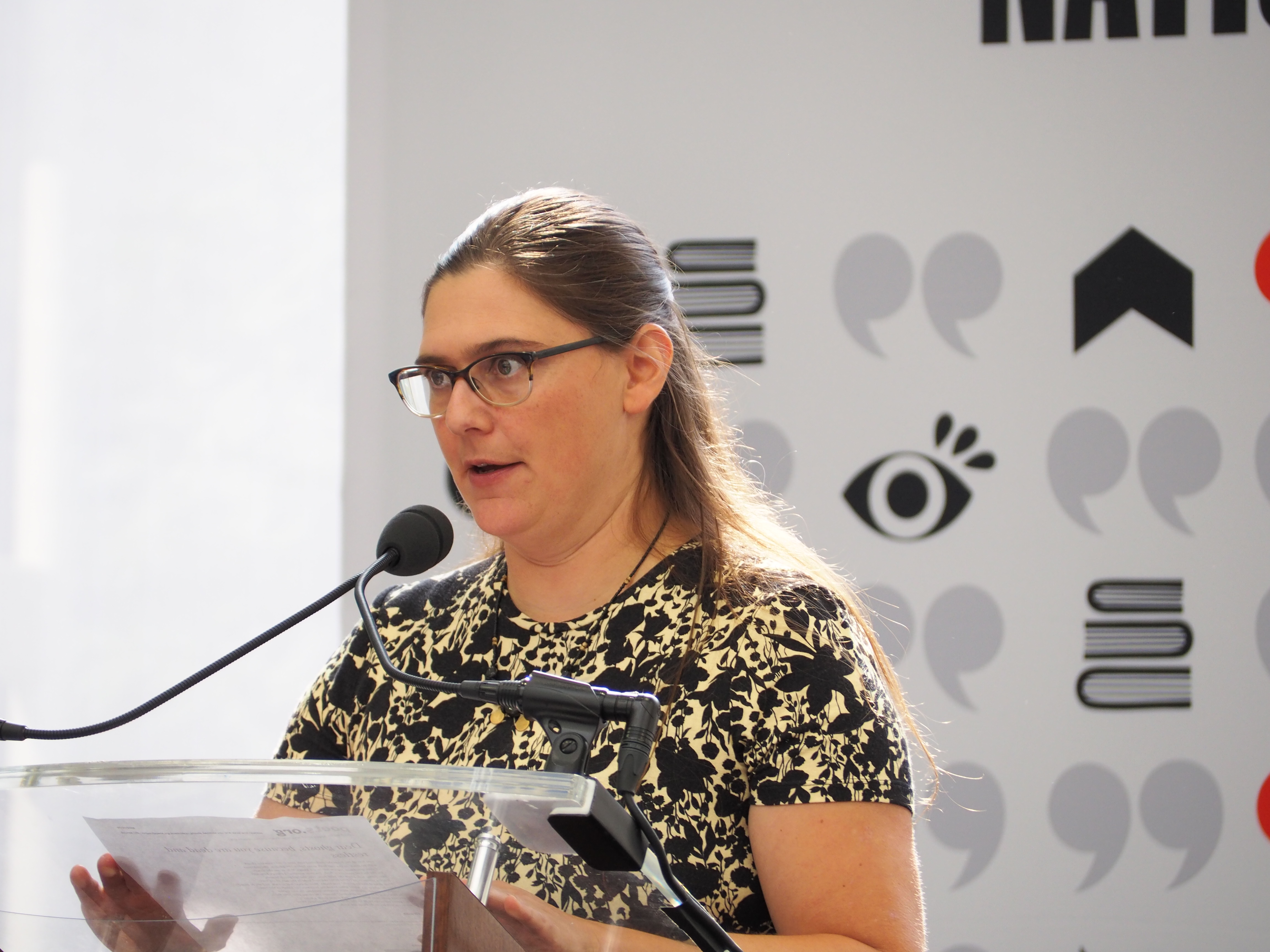
- Julia Bouwsma reading at national book festival (2024)
- Born: New Haven, Connecticut, U.S.
- Education: Swarthmore College (BA); Goddard College (MFA)
- Occupations: Poet, librarian, educator
- Writing career
- Language: English
- Genre: Poetry
- Notable works: Work by Bloodlight (2017); Midden (2018); Death Fluorescence (2025)
- Notable awards: Maine Literary Award for Poetry (2018, 2019); Cider Press Review Book Award (2015, manuscript); Poets Out Loud Prize (2016–2017)
- Website: www.juliabouwsma.com

Julia Bouwsma (born 1980) is an American poet, educator, and librarian. She is the author of the poetry collections Work by Bloodlight (2017) and Midden (2018), both of which received Maine Literary Award for Poetry in consecutive years. She is the current Poet Laureate of Maine.

== Early life and education ==
Bouwsma was born in New Haven, Connecticut, in 1980. She earned a Bachelor of Arts degree from Swarthmore College and later completed a Master of Fine Arts at Goddard College.

== Career ==
Bouwsma's literary career has been shaped by her engagement with rural life, land-based labor, and community history in western Maine.

=== Books ===
Bouwsma has published three poetry collections. Her debut, Work by Bloodlight (2017), draws on homesteading and rural labor, while Midden (2018) addresses the forced eviction of the Malaga Island community in Maine. Both collections received the Maine Literary Award for Poetry.

Bouwsma previously served as managing editor for Alice James Books. Her work has been featured in journals such as Cutthroat, Poetry Daily, Poetry Northwest, RHINO, and River Styx. She previously taught creative writing at the University of Maine at Farmington and has served on the Community Advisory Board of the Maine Writers & Publishers Alliance.

Bouwsma has received numerous honors for her work, including Fordham University Press's Poets Out Loud Prize (2016–2017), the Cider Press Review Book Award (2015), and writing residencies from the Virginia Center for the Creative Arts, Vermont Studio Center, Monson Arts, and Annex Arts in Castine, Maine.

| Title | Year Published | Publisher | Notes |
|---|---|---|---|
| Midden | 2018 | Fordham University Press | Winner of the Maine Literary Award for Poetry; Finalist for the Julie Suk Award; Selected as one of NPR’s 2018 Great Reads; Named one of Book Riot’s 50 Must-Read Poetry Collections of 2019 |
| Work by Bloodlight | 2017 | Cider Press Review | Winner of Cider Press Review Book Award (2015, manuscript); Winner of the Maine Literary Award for Poetry. |
| Death Fluorescence | 2025 | Sundress Publications | Poetry collection |

=== Poet Laureate ===
In 2021, Bouwsma was appointed Maine's sixth poet laureate. She is serving a five-year term from 2021 to 2026. As poet laureate, she has emphasized poetry as a tool for accessibility, dialogue, and connection across Maine's geographically and culturally diverse communities, with particular attention to rural regions.

During her tenure, Bouwsma launched the Write ME: An Epistolary Poetry Project in collaboration with the Maine Writers & Publishers Alliance and with support from the Maine Arts Commission. The project began as a pilot program in 2023, serving five counties through poetry workshops and a correspondence exchange involving more than 150 participants.

In 2024, Bouwsma received an Academy of American Poets Laureate Fellowship. This helped expand her Write ME project into a statewide initiative, offering free public workshops across all 16 Maine counties during the winter of 2024–2025.

In April 2025, Bouwsma participated in a public commemoration of the 250th anniversary of Paul Revere's midnight ride, held at the Maine State House. During the event, she recited excerpts from Henry Wadsworth Longfellow's poem, Paul Revere's Ride.

== Personal life ==
Bouwsma lives off-grid in New Portland, Maine, where she homesteads and works as library director of Webster Library in Kingfield.

Bouwsma has described her homesteading practice as an influence on her poetry.
