= Killing of Tim McLean =

Murder of a 22-year-old man in Canada

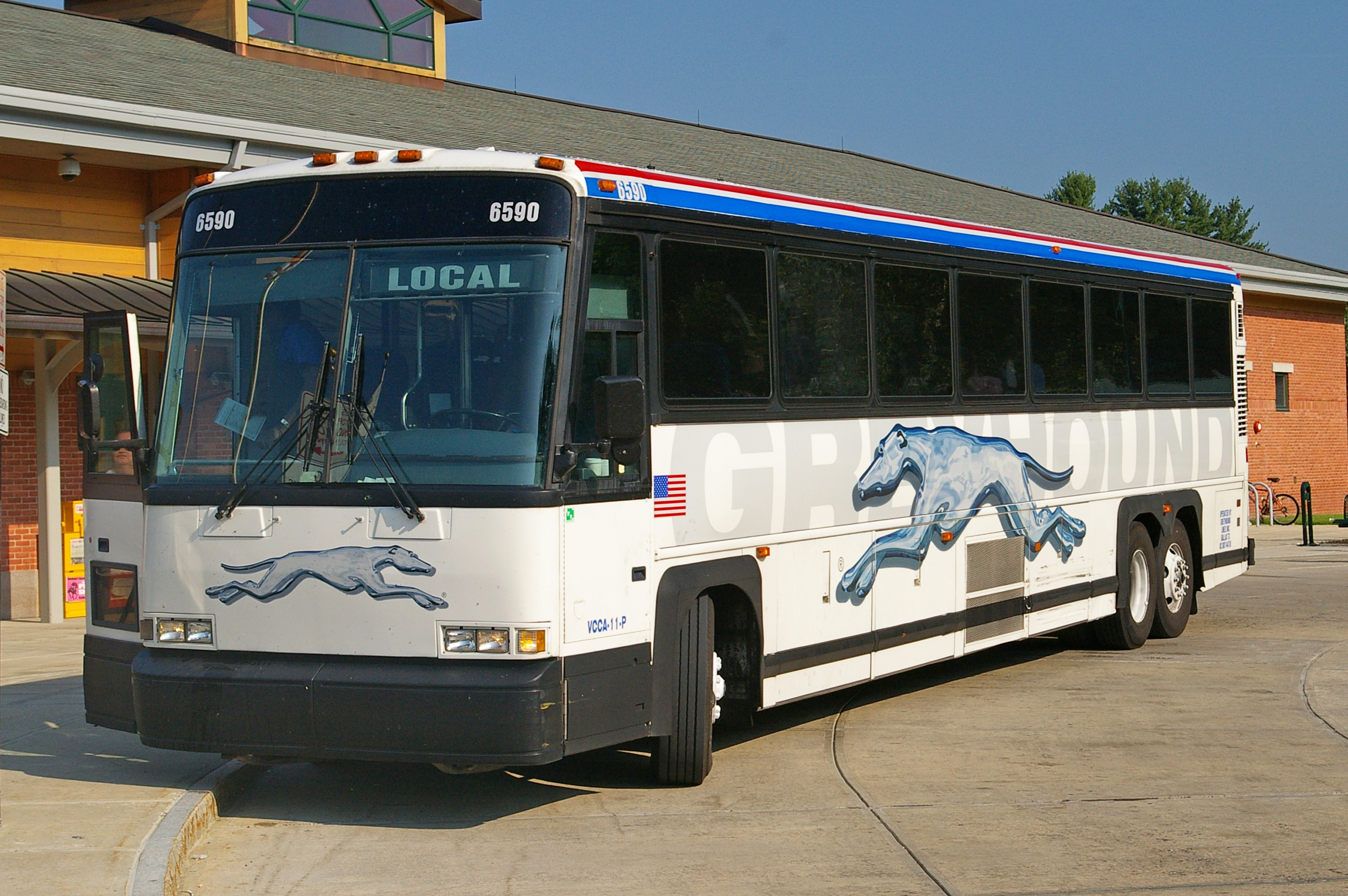
- A Greyhound bus similar to that taken by McLean
- Location: near Portage la Prairie, Manitoba, Canada
- Date: 30 July 2008 – 31 July 2008; 8:30 p.m. – 1:30 a.m. (CDT)
- Target: Random attack
- Attack type: Homicide, stabbing, decapitation, cannibalism
- Weapon: Knife
- Victims: Timothy Richard McLean, aged 22
- Perpetrator: Vincent Weiguang Li
- Motive: Li's schizophrenic delusions that McLean was a demon and that God had commanded him to kill McLean
- Charges: Second-degree murder
- Verdict: Not criminally responsible on account of mental disorder
- Sentence: Involuntary commitment (released after 6 years)

On 30 July 2008, 22-year-old Tim McLean was stabbed, beheaded, and cannibalized while riding a Greyhound Canada bus along the Trans-Canada Highway, about 30 km (19 mi) west of Portage la Prairie, Manitoba. On 5 March 2009, his killer, 40-year-old Vince Li, was found not criminally responsible for murder, after it was determined that he was schizophrenic. Li was remanded to a high-security section of the Selkirk Mental Health Centre in Selkirk, Manitoba, where he was detained until his release on 8 May 2015.

== Incident ==
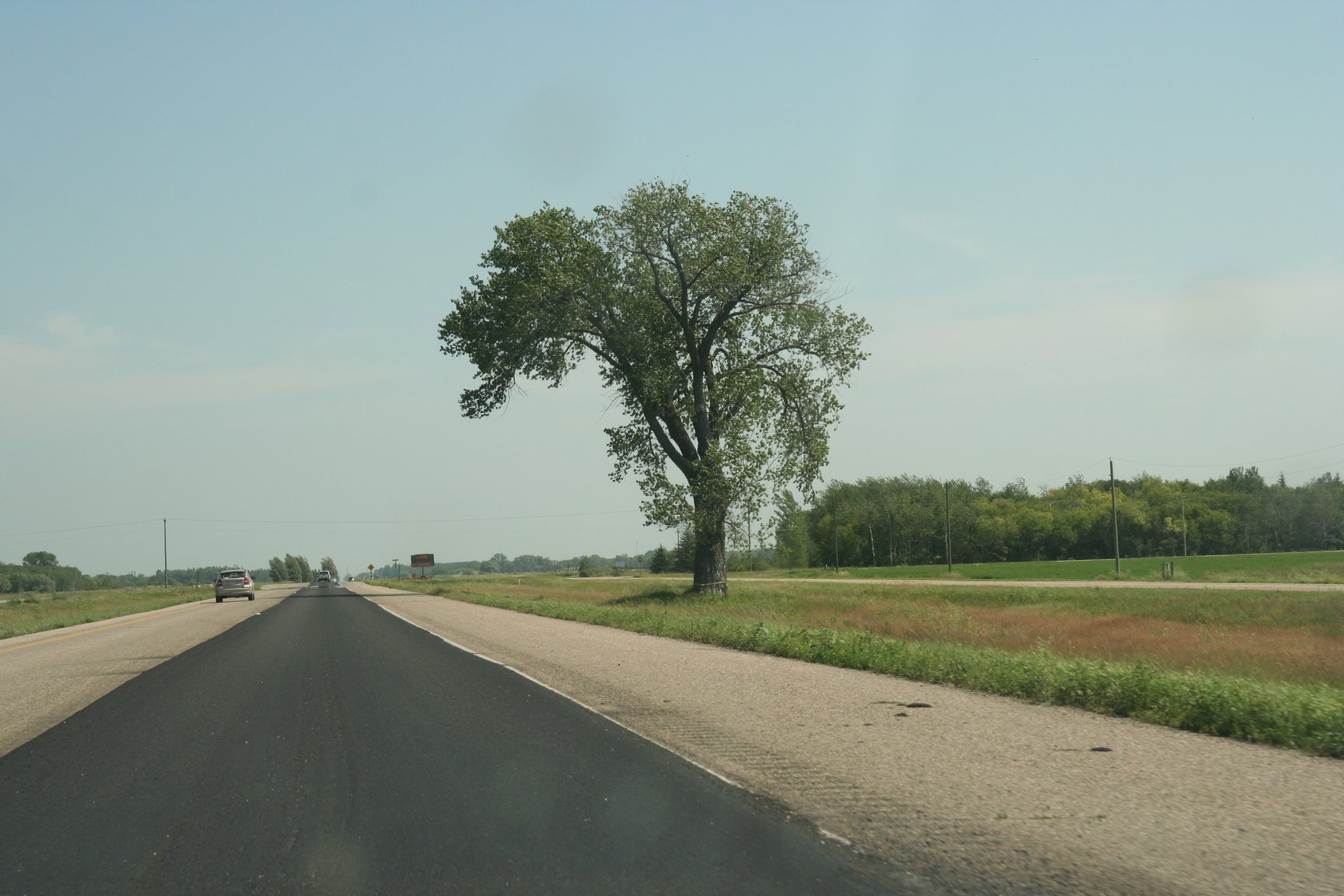
Trans-Canada Highway west of Portage la Prairie

On 30 July 2008, Tim McLean, a carnival barker, was returning home to Winnipeg after working at a fair in Edmonton. He departed Edmonton on board Greyhound bus 1170 to Winnipeg, via the Yellowhead Highway through Saskatchewan. He sat at the rear, one row ahead of the toilet. At 6:55 p.m., the bus departed Erickson, Manitoba, with a new passenger, Vince Li. Li, a tall man in his 40s with a shaved head and sunglasses, first sat near the front of the bus, then moved to sit next to McLean after a scheduled rest stop in Brandon. McLean "barely acknowledged" Li, then fell asleep against the window pane, headphones covering his ears.

Li produced a large knife and began stabbing McLean in the neck and chest. The bus driver pulled to the side of the road and fled the vehicle with all the other passengers. The driver and two other men tried to rescue McLean, but were chased away by Li, who slashed at them from behind the locked bus doors. Li decapitated McLean and displayed his severed head to those outside the bus, then began severing other parts of McLean's body and consuming his flesh. This went on for some hours.

At 8:30 p.m., the Royal Canadian Mounted Police (RCMP) in Portage la Prairie received a report of the stabbing. They arrived to find the suspect on the bus, prevented from escaping by another passenger, the bus driver, and a truck driver, who had provided a crowbar and a hammer as weapons. The other passengers were huddled at the roadside, some crying and vomiting. Because the suspect had tried to drive the bus away, the driver had engaged the emergency immobiliser rendering the vehicle inoperable.

By 9:00 p.m., police were in a standoff and had summoned special negotiators and an armed tactical unit. The suspect alternately paced the length of the bus and defiled the corpse. Police saw Li eating parts of the body and heard him say, "I have to stay on the bus forever."

On 31 July 2008, at 1:30 a.m., Li tried to leave the bus by breaking a window. The police arrested Li. He was shot twice with a Taser, handcuffed, and put in the back of a police cruiser. Parts of the victim's body, placed in plastic bags, were retrieved from the bus; his ear, nose, and tongue were found in Li's pockets. The victim's eyes and a part of his heart were never recovered and, in spite of his denial, are presumed to have been eaten by Li.

The passengers were interviewed at the Brandon RCMP detachment. On 31 July 2008, 10:00 a.m., Greyhound representatives took the passengers to a store to replace their clothes, which remained on the bus. The passengers arrived in Winnipeg at 3:30 p.m. that day.

== Tim McLean ==
Timothy Richard McLean Jr., was born on 3 October 1985, in Winnipeg, Manitoba. He grew up in Winnipeg and in Elie, Manitoba. He was 22 years old at the time of his death, and had been working as a carnival barker in Edmonton, Alberta.

On 21 December 2008, five months after McLean's death, his girlfriend Colleen Yestrau gave birth to a son. In 2009, a custody dispute between Yestrau and McLean's parents over guardianship of the boy began. The boy began living with the McLean family in January 2015; in February 2016, the McLean family won full custody. McLean's mother Carol de Delley has described her grandson as "a gift from God sent by my son to give me a reason to get up every day and to take care of". Due to disputes with the agency supervising visits and the separation of McLean's mother from her husband, the boy has remained with de Delley, and neither Yestrau nor Timothy McLean Sr. have seen him since 2018 and 2016 respectively.

== Vince Li ==
Vincent Weiguang Li (Chinese: 李伟光; pinyin: Lǐ Wěiguāng) was born on 30 April 1968 in Dandong, Liaoning, China, as the second of three children. Li's father was a custodian while his mother was a math teacher. He was born one month premature, and it was noted by psychiatrists in his youth that Li was very sickly throughout most of his childhood and exhibited developmental delays, learning to walk and talk only at around five years old and starting elementary school at age nine. Nevertheless, his health and academic progress improved upon entering high school. At age 19, Li began studying automotive engineering at the Wuhan Institute of Technology from which he graduated with a bachelor's degree in computing in 1992. From 1994 to 1998, Li worked in Beijing as a computer software engineer. He married his wife, Anna, whom he met while working at a factory in Beijing, in June 1995. According to Li's wife and family, he displayed no signs of mental illness, although it was noted at Li's trial that his maternal uncle suffered from an unspecified psychiatric disorder. His father described his son as "stubborn and restless" and that he had a tendency for "always moving around".

Li immigrated to Canada on 11 June 2001 (though some newspapers mistakenly reported 2004) as part of the Federal Skilled Worker Program, and remained a Chinese national until he became a Canadian citizen on 7 November 2006. Starting in the fall of 2004, he worked in Winnipeg at menial jobs at Grant Memorial Church for six months to support his wife, Anna. Pastor Tom Castor, who employed Li, said he seemed happy to have a job and was committed to doing it well, despite a language barrier with other congregation members. "I think he would occasionally feel frustrated with not being able to communicate or understand," Castor told CTV Winnipeg. "But we have very patient staff members and he seemed to respond well." Castor also said Li did not show any signs of anger issues or any other trouble before he quit in the spring of 2005. He began working as a forklift operator in Winnipeg that same year's summer while his wife worked as a waitress.

According to Stanley Yaren, his court psychiatrist, Li told him that he had converted to Christianity and was baptised during his employment at Grant Memorial Church, after he heard the "voice of God" talking to him. Li said that the voice called him the "third story of the Bible", as well as the "second coming of Jesus", destined to save people from an alien invasion. In preparation, the voice would regularly order Li to travel through the country on foot or by bus, often disappearing from his home for days on end, as corroborated by his wife. Due to his paranoid belief that he was constantly under threat by alien infiltrators, Li began carrying a buck knife on his person for protection. This is the same knife he ultimately used to kill McLean. His delusions would later be ascribed to undiagnosed schizophrenia. Li's wife recalled that he often went several days without sleeping or eating, and often spent his days at home crying and telling her about his visions of God. She and many of Li's friends attempted to get Li to visit a doctor for his auditory hallucinations, but he refused due to a fear of hospitals. The couple subsequently separated in March 2005, leading Li to leave for Thompson, initially planning to buy land, but after realizing that he had no money, he instead began working as an overnight maintenance worker at a local Wal-Mart. Four months later, Li saved up enough to move back to Winnipeg, where he briefly worked as a gas station attendant for Domo and part-time at a Tim Hortons. Li says it was during this time that he suffered his first full-blown mental breakdown.

In September 2005, the voice in Li's head convinced him to abandon everything to head for Toronto as it was "easier to find work there". After failing to do so, the voice told Li to go back to Winnipeg on foot, discarding his luggage by a roadside. He was later found by Ontario Provincial Police, wandering Highway 427, malnourished and dehydrated, stating that he was "following the sun" at the command of God. He was examined at William Osler Health Centre and despite some local newspapers reporting that Li was diagnosed with schizophrenia by staff there and refused medication, official records show that Li was never documented for mental illness. After Li checked himself out of the clinic, against the advice of doctors who wanted him to stay for a month for continued observation, he called his wife and asked her to book him a flight back to Dandong. There, his parents noticed their son's change in personality and that although Li found work more easily, he was unable to stay employed for longer than a few days due to his sudden irritability. Li's wife joined her husband shortly after, and they tried to reconcile, but they ended up divorcing when she saw that Li's mental faculties had only worsened since their separation.

Li moved back to Canada and settled in Toronto, where he was unemployed. He called his ex-wife regularly, telling her he missed her and was unable to work. She allowed Li to live with her in Winnipeg until he was able to live by himself again, but less than a year later in 2006, Li left his ex-wife when he abruptly relocated to Edmonton. For a while, Li lived in his car after again failing to find a job. His ex-wife continued to send him money and in July 2007, she moved in with Li, with their relationship improving in the following months. From then on, his jobs included work as a janitor, mechanic and cashier at a Wal-Mart, service at a McDonald's restaurant, and newspaper delivery. His delivery boss, Vincent Augert, described Li as reliable, hard-working and not showing any signs of trouble. Li's ex-wife said that he appeared happy for the first time since his hallucinations began.

In June 2008, Li's mental health deteriorated rapidly. He flew back to China on a whim to see his family, but stayed only for a day before returning, telling his father that he had just come to "find a wife". Four weeks before the killing, Li was fired from Wal-Mart following a disagreement with another employee. Shortly before the incident, he asked for time off from his delivery job to go to Winnipeg for a job interview. On 24 July, Li left the home he shared with his ex-wife, leaving a note reading "Don’t look for me. I wish you were happy". As Li had frequently left her and returned without notice during their marriage, she was not worried about this until Li called her on 26 July and clarified that he would not be coming back.

=== 29 July 2008 ===
At 12:05 p.m. on 28 July in Edmonton, Li boarded a Greyhound bus bound for Winnipeg. On 29 July, around 6 p.m., Li got off the bus in Erickson, Manitoba, with at least three pieces of luggage, and stayed the night on a bench next to a grocery store. According to one witness, he was seen at 3 a.m. sitting "bolt upright" with eyes wide open. On the morning of 30 July, still at the bench, he sold his new laptop computer to a 15-year-old boy for $60. The laptop was seized by the RCMP as evidence. It contained over 20 individual résumés applying for jobs in differing fields, including convenience stores, fast food restaurants, IT departments and the Royal Canadian Mounted Police, though it has not been specified which position he was applying for. There were also several images, such as body shots of female models, pictures of military parades by the People's Liberation Army and photos taken by Li himself, including various mountains in British Columbia, as well as multiple angle shots of a BAE CT-155 Hawk mid-flight, the latter two of which are assumed to have been made during his travels across Canada while undergoing schizophrenic episodes. There was also an undated and unsent message addressed to either a family member or friend in China, in which Li commented on how he enjoyed living in Canada, but states that he misses home and that Canada was "not as he expected".

=== Trial ===
When he appeared in a Portage la Prairie courthouse on charges of second-degree murder, the only words Li reportedly uttered were "Please kill me". Li's trial commenced on 3 March 2009, with Li pleading not criminally responsible on account of mental disorder. This means he accepted that the offence occurred but claimed that he was unable to form the necessary mental element or mens rea. Stanley Yaren said that his patient's schizophrenia rendered him inculpable, as he had been under the false belief that McLean was a "force of evil" and posed an imminent threat to himself and others. In Li's mind, McLean was really a demon in disguise and an alien who needed to be "destroyed", to the point where he felt it was necessary to mutilate McLean's body to prevent him from coming back to life. Li had also felt pressured to perform the attack by voices he believed were from God, telling him to kill McLean sitting beside him, or he would be killed himself. Both the defense and the prosecution were in agreement with Yaren's assessment and spoke in favour of involuntary commitment to a mental institution rather than prison time. The presiding judge, John Scurfield, accepted the diagnosis, and ruled that Li was not criminally responsible for the killing. Li was remanded to the Selkirk Mental Health Centre.

== Aftermath ==
The week following the attack, Greyhound Canada announced it was pulling a series of nationwide advertisements which included the slogan, "There's a reason you've never heard of bus rage." The incident led to numerous calls and petitions demanding increased security on intercity buses.

- The family of Tim McLean have brought a lawsuit of $150,000 against Greyhound, the Attorney General of Canada, and Vince Li. As of July 2018, according to Timothy McLean Sr., the lawsuit was "in limbo".
- On 3 June 2010, Li was granted supervised outdoor walks within his mental health facility as voted by the provincial review board.
- On 16 February 2011, two passengers, Debra Tucker and Kayli Shaw, filed a lawsuit against Li, Greyhound, the RCMP, and the Canadian government for being exposed to the beheading. They were each seeking $3 million in damages. On 14 July 2015, the two women dropped their lawsuit.
- On 30 May 2011, CBC reported that Li was responding well to his psychiatric treatment and that his doctor had recommended that he receive more freedoms, phased in over several months.
- On 17 May 2012, the National Post reported that Li had been granted temporary passes that would allow him out of the Selkirk Mental Health Centre for visits to the town of Selkirk, supervised by a nurse and peace officer. In an interview with Chris Summerville of The Schizophrenia Society of Canada, Li spoke publicly for the first time, sharing that his condition is slowly improving. He is being prescribed olanzapine, and was learning about schizophrenia, as well as ways to cope with it in a healthy manner. Li affirmed his guilt, saying he "can never forget the Greyhound bus" and that he believes that he can never be happy again, acknowledging that McLean's family likely will not forgive him. When asked for parting words, Li offered an apology to McLean's mother, stating "I would like to say to Tim McLean's mother, I am sorry for killing your son. I am sorry for the pain I have caused. I wished I could reduce that pain."
- On 27 February 2014, CBC reported that on 6 March, Li would be allowed to have unsupervised visits to Selkirk, starting at 30 minutes and expanding to full-day trips. Since 2013, he had been allowed to have supervised visits to Lockport, Winnipeg, and nearby beaches. Those visits were then relaxed.
- On 17 July 2014, the Toronto Sun and National Post reported that one of the first officers on the scene, Corporal Ken Barker of the RCMP, had committed suicide. The family stated in his obituary that he suffered from post-traumatic stress disorder.
- On 27 February 2015, CBC News reported that Li was given unsupervised day passes to visit Winnipeg so long as he carried a functioning cellular telephone while using them.
- On 8 May 2015, CTV News reported that Li would be granted passes to group homes in the community.
- In February 2016, it was reported that Li had legally changed his name to Will Lee Baker and was seeking to leave his group home to live independently. He won the right to live alone on 26 February upon the recommendation of the Criminal Code Review Board.
- On 10 February 2017, the Manitoba Criminal Code Review Board ordered Li be discharged. Li was granted an absolute discharge. There will be no legal obligations or restrictions pertaining to Li's independent living.

== In popular culture ==
Vincent (Cider Press, 2015), a book-length poem by American poet Joseph Fasano, is a fictionalized work based loosely on the event.

== See also ==
- 2001 Greyhound bus attack
- Katherine Knight
- List of incidents of cannibalism
- Murder of Yang Xin
- Murder of Jun Lin
- Omaima Nelson
- Killing of Iryna Zarutska
