= Harbor Island, Phippsburg, Maine =

Island in Sagadahoc County, Maine, United States

Harbor Island
- Location within Maine

Geography
- Coordinates: 43°46′08″N 69°52′14″W

Administration
- United States
- State: Maine
- County: Sagadahoc

Harbor Island is a small, heavily wooded island at the mouth of the New Meadows River across from the shores of Sebasco in Phippsburg, Sagadahoc County, Maine, United States. There are two beaches on the island, one on the south end just across from Sebasco Harbor Resort, the other a small sandy cove on the north end. There are a few private homes on the island.

The island's first known settler was Benjamin Darling. Legend has it that Benjamin Darling was a black slave who was given his freedom as a reward for saving his master, Captain Darling, in a shipwreck. Though he is believed to have been a slave from the West Indies, DNA of his ancestors has been traced to the Senegal / Gambia region of Africa. Darling bought Harbor Island in 1794 for 15 pounds.

Benjamin Darling and his wife, Sara Proverbs (who was supposedly a white woman), settled on the island and began their family there. Their descendants later settled on islands and the mainland surrounding Harbor Island, including Malaga Island, half a mile to the northwest. Malaga is now preserved and owned by the Maine Coast Heritage Trust and is one of the most important aspects of Maine's Black History.

In 1912, descendants of Ben and Sara and others who had settled on Malaga Island were evicted by the state. They did not own the land and several had become wards of the state. Eight of them were relocated to Pineland Center for the Feeble Minded. Some of Benjamin and Sara's descendants stayed on Harbor Island. Others moved to the mainland of Phippsburg primarily into the fishing villages of West Point and Sebasco and to Cundy's Harbor.

Harbor Island is called "Horse Island" by the locals as the horses used at Corneleus Ice Pond, also known as Watuh Lake, for the ice trade industry in the late 1800s and early 1900s were kept there during the summer.

== In popular culture ==
=== Music ===
- "The Story of Benjamin Darling, Part I" by State Radio on their 2007 album Year of the Crow.
