= Malaga Island =

Island in Maine, US

Native name: Brant Island
- Location within Maine

Geography
- Coordinates: 43°46′54″N 069°52′30″W
- Area: 0.0641 sq mi (0.166 km^{2})

Administration
- United States
- State: Maine
- Municipality: Phippsburg

Malaga Island is a 41-acre (170,000 m^{2}) island at the mouth of the New Meadows River in Casco Bay, Maine, United States. It was the site of an interracial community from the American Civil War until 1911, when the residents were forcibly evicted from the island. It is now an uninhabited reserve owned and managed by the Maine Coast Heritage Trust. Public daytime access is permitted.

== History ==
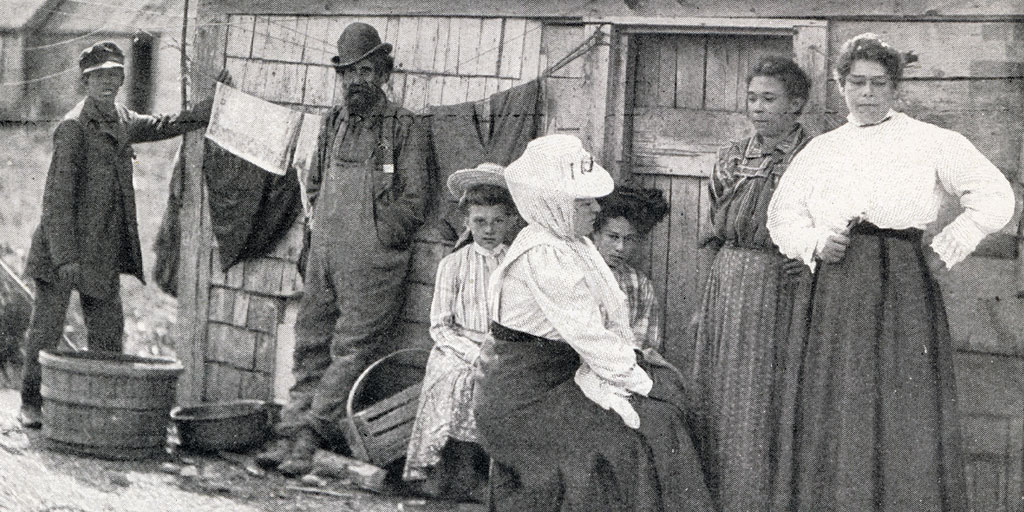
Malaga Island residents posing with a missionary outside their home for the September 1909 issue of Harper's Weekly.

Allen Breed writes that there are multiple theories of how the community formed. "Some say the island was a convenient place for merchant seaman to drop their black paramours before sailing home to their wives" or being a stop on the Underground Railroad, but neither of these theories have evidence to back up their claims. Instead, it is believed that most Malaga settlers were descendants of Benjamin Darling, a Freedman who settled nearby Harbor Island. The first resident of the island was a black man named Henry Griffin from Harpswell, who is believed to have moved there in the early to mid 1860s. By 1880, the island was believed to have 27 people.

The Casco Bay Breeze, Bangor Daily News and other newspapers investigated during the 1890s, then printed stories about a "degenerate colony" whose indiscretions included the use of tobacco and tea. Some reports alleged incest and wife swapping in the community, as well as children with blunted horns living underground. The towns of Phippsburg and Harpswell fought not to take control over the settlement (as they would have to pay to support paupers in the community), but to build a hotel for business, and in 1905 the State of Maine named island residents wards of the state. The state built a school and furnished a schoolteacher and began focusing its attention on the unorthodox community.

While some saw improvement in the island, Governor Frederick W. Plaisted saw blight on the state's reputation. Under the Governor's direction, Maine's authorities abducted and removed men, women, and children, many of whom were forced into various institutions and, in 1912, undertook the mass eviction of the remaining 45-member interracial community. To discourage resettlement, Maine authorities eventually even dug up the graves, and took the dead for burial at the Maine School for the Feeble-Minded in New Gloucester.

The island was bought by Eli Perry in 1818 for $150, though there are few records of continued ownership. The island was mentioned twice in the family's deeds over the next hundred years, "and never in any of the Perry family wills". Tax records in Phippsburg found that no one had ever paid taxes on the island. In 1911, despite these questions on ownership, the Perry family ordered the residents to leave. The state then bought the island and evicted the islanders, paying them a relocation stipend. One family of seven and one other person were deemed feeble-minded and placed in an institution, although the accuracy of their diagnosis is disputed.

Missionaries helping the Islanders had negotiated to buy the island from the Perry family in order to allow the residents to stay, but the governor outbid them and then evicted the residents. The governor's motivation is unclear, as he had previously pledged to help the community. It is speculated that this was a personal retribution against the missionaries, who had defeated him in a bitter political fight over Prohibition.

In 1912, the state authorized advertising the sale of the island.

The descendants of around fifty individuals once living on Malaga Island became scattered around different towns and cities in Maine.

Following the eviction, the state of Maine tore down all structures on the island except for the schoolhouse, which was moved to nearby Louds Island.

== Recognition and legacy ==
On April 7, 2010, Maine legislators finally issued an official statement of regret for the Malaga incident, but did so without notifying descendants and other stakeholders either before or after the fact. The "public" apology didn't become known to the public until nearly four months later, when an article appeared in a monthly magazine, Down East, which also procured a statement of regret by Governor John Baldacci. The island was listed on the National Register of Historic Places in 2023.

In 2012, a retrospective exhibit at the Maine State Museum was opened by governor Paul LePage. From 2019–2020, the Tate Gallery in London presented an installation, Amalgam, by social practice artist Theaster Gates (b. 1973) interpreting the history of Malaga.

American novelist Paul Harding uses the history of the island and its people as inspiration for a fictional narrative in 2023's This Other Eden. Critics claimed the novel includes harmful myths about the island's residents that historians have tried to correct.

Author Stephen Hemingway of Woolwich, Maine has used Malaga Island for his 2012 historical fiction novel, "The Malaga Chronicles."

In the 2025 movie The History of Sound the main characters visit Malaga Island to collect folk songs before the community's eviction. The movie changes the date of the event from 1912 to 1920.

== See also ==
- List of islands of Maine
- Harbor Island, Phippsburg, Maine
- National Register of Historic Places listings in Sagadahoc County, Maine
