= Hannah Ropes =

American nurse, abolitionist, and writer

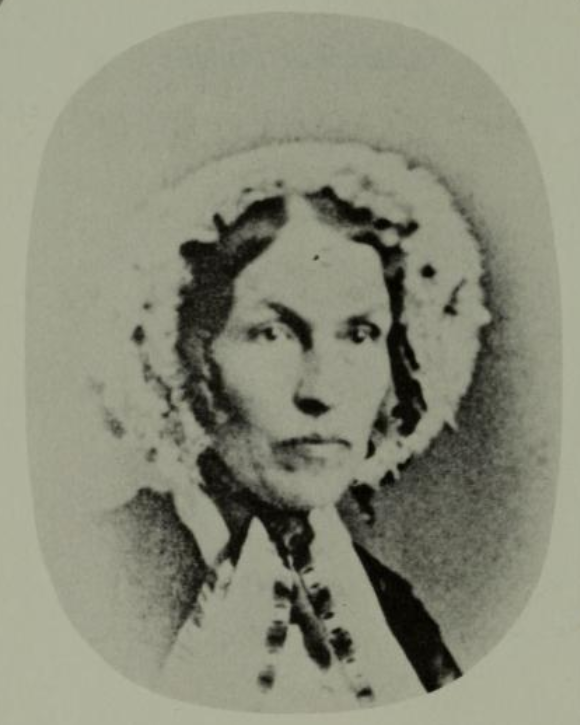
- Born: June 13, 1809; New Gloucester
- Died: January 20, 1863; Georgetown
- Occupations: Nurse, abolitionist, writer
- Parents: Peleg Chandler (father); Esther Chandler (mother)
- Relatives: Theophilus Chandler, Peleg Chandler

Hannah Anderson Ropes (June 13, 1809 – January 20, 1863) was an American nurse, abolitionist, and writer.

== Early life and marriage ==
Ropes was born Hannah Anderson Chandler on June 13, 1809 in New Gloucester, Massachusetts (which became part of Maine in 1820). She was the seventh of ten children of Peleg Chandler, a Maine lawyer, and Esther Parsons Chandler. Her brothers Theophilus and Peleg became lawyers and politicians in Boston. Nothing is known of her schooling, but given her family's income and social position it is likely she was well educated.

In February 1834, she married William Henry Ropes, an educator who was forced to supplement his income through farming. He was principal of the Foxcroft Academy (1832-1835), Milton Academy (1836-1837), and Waltham High School (1837-1840). They had four children, and two survived to adulthood: Edward Elson Ropes (b. 1837) and Alice Shephard Ropes (b. 1841).

In 1837, she joined the Boston Society of the New Jerusalem and embraced Swedenborgianism, a controversial contrast with the established churches favored by New England society, a contrast she relished as part of her lifelong individualism.

Sometime between 1847 and 1855, the once flourishing Ropes marriage broke down, perhaps due to financial or health problems, and William Ropes permanently relocated to Florida, leaving Hannah Ropes to raise their two children in New England.

== Bleeding Kansas ==
In the 1850s Ropes became a fervent abolitionist. As the Kansas Territory became a flashpoint in the struggle between abolitionists and slavery proponents, many people from New England resettled there as freesoil homesteaders, including Edward Ropes in 1855. Hannah and Alice accompanied a group of settlers to Lawrence, Kansas and joined him there in September 1855. There she served as a nurse for sick homesteaders.

It was a dangerous time in what was known as "Bleeding Kansas", and abolitionist settlers were the target of violence, including rape and murder, by pro-slavery forces. In November, she wrote to Senator Charles Sumner: "There is not, there has not been, a single cabin safe from outrage anywhere in the territory for the two past weeks. Without the slightest provocation, men are cut down, leaving families in lone places without any protection." She wrote to her mother that she slept with "loaded pistols and a bowie-knife upon my table at night, [and] three Sharp’s rifles, loaded, standing in the room."

Hannah sent Alice back to Massachusetts due to an illness, and soon decided to also leave Kansas due to the violence and poor living conditions. She returned to Massachusetts in April 1856, missing the sacking of Lawrence in May.

Ropes quickly edited the many letters she wrote to her mother and others like Sumner into a book, published later that year as Six Months in Kansas: By a Lady. She continued to be an active abolitionist and reformer, and published a novel inspired by her son's homesteading experience, Cranston House (1859).

== Civil War nurse ==
In 1860, Ropes' nephew Charles Peleg Chandler gave her a copy of Florence Nightingale's popular book Notes on Nursing: What it is and What it is Not (1859). Nightingale's book, her nursing experiences in Kansas, and her desire to aid the Union cause during the American Civil War - including her own son, who had enlisted in the Union Army - prompted her to volunteer as a nurse in a military hospital in 1862. She was appointed matron (supervisor of nurses) of the Union Hotel Hospital in Georgetown, a once fashionable hotel built in 1796 but now a medical facility known for its deplorable conditions.

Military nurses were under the charge of the formidable Dorothea Dix, though Ropes declared she didn't "care a fig" for Dix. Though nurses were at the bottom of the chain of command, Ropes did not hesitate to use her social and political connections to improve conditions. When Dr. A. M. Clark, the chief hospital surgeon, refused to do anything about an abusive hospital steward who was stealing supplies meant for wounded soldiers, despite repeated complaints to him and to US Surgeon General William A. Hammond, Ropes approached US Secretary of War Edwin Stanton directly, who had both the steward and Clark arrested.

Later that year, Louisa May Alcott arrived at the Union Hotel Hospital as a volunteer nurse. Alcott admired her supervisor and praised Ropes in Hospital Sketches, the book Alcott wrote about her experiences there. In late December, a number of the nurses, including Ropes and Alcott, took ill. At first it was thought Ropes and Alcott had pneumonia and were ineffectually treated with mercury, but were later diagnosed with typhoid fever. Alcott was sent home to recover, but Ropes died on January 20, 1863. Her funeral was arranged by Senator Sumner.

Ropes had planned to write another book about her hospital experiences, but her diary and letters were collected and published in 1980 as Civil War Nurse: The Diary and Letters of Hannah Ropes.
