= Wilsondale Farm =

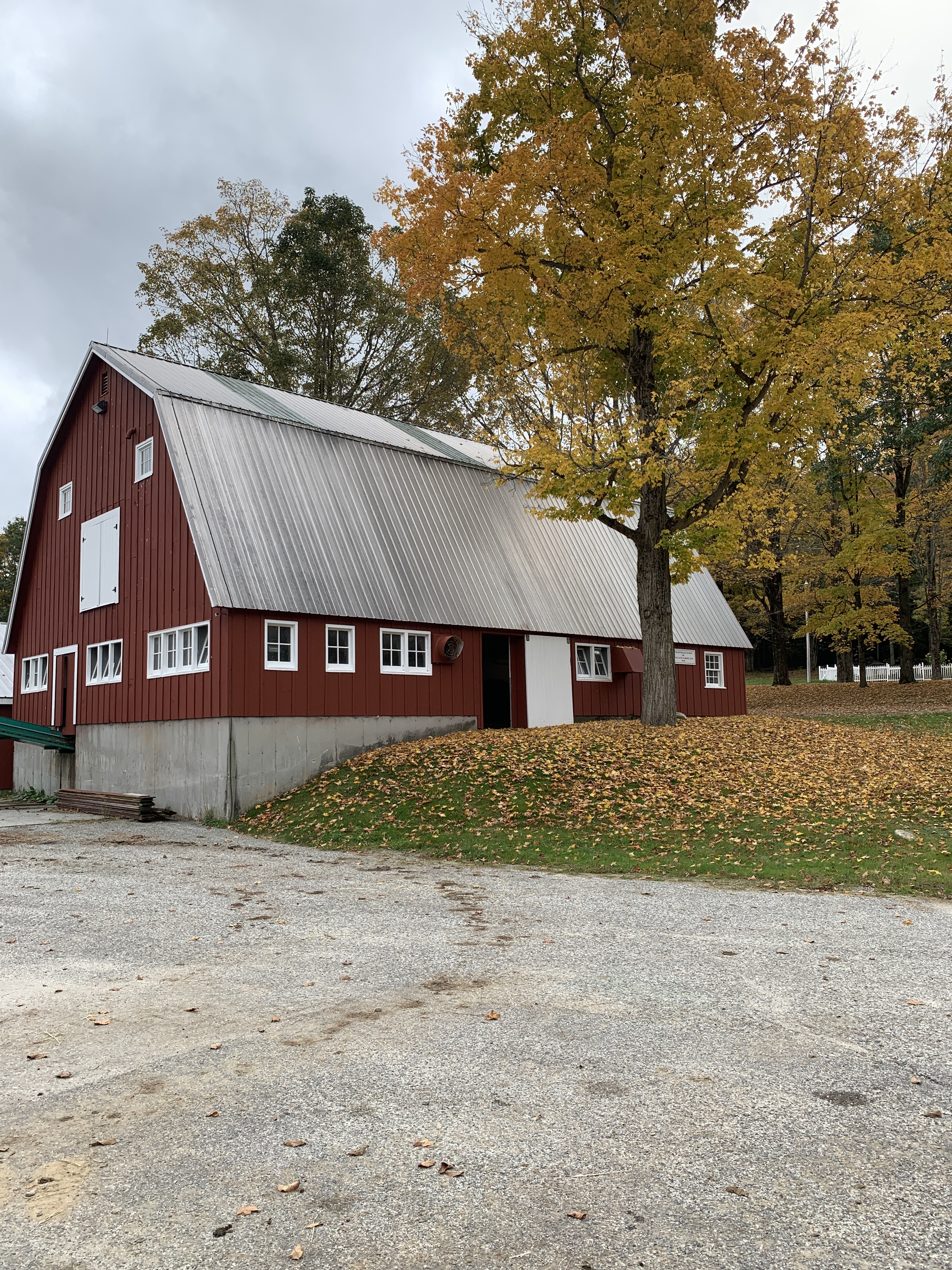
- A cattle barn at the farm (2021)

- Location within Maine
- Town/City: Gray
- State: Maine
- Country: United States
- Coordinates: 43.9067693°N 70.2908449°W
- Established: 1961 (65 years ago)
- Owner: Pineland Farms
- Area: 900 acres (3,600,000 m^{2})
- Produces: Dairy products
- Status: Open to the public

Wilsondale Farm is a dairy farm in Gray, Maine, United States. It is notable for its introduction of a specific breed of Holstein cow. It was originally known as Springdale Farm.

The farm, of 900 acres (3,600,000 m^{2}), was purchased by New Gloucester's Pineland Farms in 2001. It is run by the Wilson family, as it has been since 1961.

Bull Run, the street on which the farm stands, is so named because of the bulls that George T. Merrill and his son, George E., used to have at the farm.

As of 2011, the farm had thirty cows.

== Trina breed ==
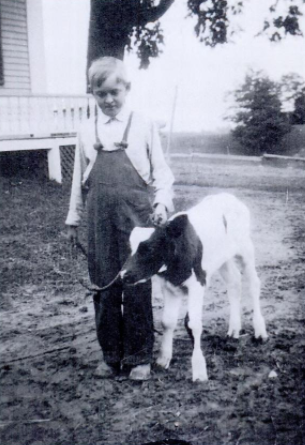
A ten-year-old Karl Merrill with "Old Trina," around 1910

One of the cows that the Wilsons inherited when they purchased the farm from Karl Merrill in 1961 was named Trina Redstone Marvel, or "Old Trina", which began the family line of Trina cows.

Merrill owned the "Springdale" herd, and his family had farmed with registered cattle since 1881. Advised by Merrill to never sell that particular brown cow, Mike Wilson learned that the cow traced back sixteen generations in direct female line to one of the first cows imported into the United States from the Netherlands. There are thirty generations of Trina Holstein offspring today.

The farm has gone on to become one of the leading Holstein breeders in the country.

Over a thousand embryos from the Wilson's Trina family of cows have been exported to the United Kingdom, initially to sell to farms in the 1980s and 1990s to build up their stock.

== Recognition ==
In 1975, the farm won the New England Outstanding Young Breeder Award. In 1999, it won the New England Master Breeder award. As of 2021, the farm was a 20-time winner of the Premier Breeder at the Maine State Show.

== Mike Wilson ==
Mike Wilson, founder of Wilsondale Farm, died at the facility on June 5, 2021. He was 79. He had worked with Pineland Farms, in an advisory capacity, after their purchase of his farm in 2001.
