= Joseph Fasano =

American poet

- Born: May 17, 1982 (age 44); Suffern, New York, US
- Education: Harvard University (BA); Columbia University (MFA)
- Writing career
- Genres: Poetry; fiction
- Website: josephfasano.net

Joseph Fasano AHC (born May 17, 1982) is an American poet and novelist.

== Biography ==
He grew up in Goshen, New York and went to Goshen Central High School. He earned a BA degree in philosophy from Harvard University in Cambridge, Massachusetts in 2005 and an MFA from Columbia University in Manhattan, New York in 2008.

His poem "Mahler in New York" won the 2008 Rattle Poetry Prize. He has been a finalist for the Missouri Review Editors' Prize and the Times Literary Supplement Poetry Competition. He taught at SUNY Purchase, Manhattanville College, and Columbia University. His poems have appeared in the Yale Review, the Southern Review, FIELD, Tin House, Boston Review, Measure, Passages North, the American Literary Review, among other publications.

In 2011, Fasano's first book, Fugue for Other Hands, won the Cider Press Review Book Award. It was nominated for the Kate Tufts Poetry Award and the Poets' Prize, "awarded annually for the best book of verse published by a living American poet two years" before the award is given. A second collection of poems, Inheritance, came out in May 2014. In 2015, he published Vincent, a book length poem based loosely on the 2008 killer of Tim McLean on a Greyhound bus shortly after the bus made a stop in Brandon, Manitoba on the Trans Canada Highway. Fasano's fourth collection of poems, The Crossing, was released in 2018. After the publication of The Last Song of the World (BOA Editions 2024), The Massachusetts Review said, "Fasano is a poet of fatherhood, intimacy, friendship, love, and so much more, which is to say, he is a poet for the living, for life."

Fasano's first novel, The Dark Heart of Every Wild Thing, was published in 2020 to critical acclaim. His second novel, The Swallows of Lunetto, became a viral sensation during a 2023 European book tour. The BBC, the Evening Standard, and The Independent gave the tour coverage. In 2013, Polutona, a magazine, released a selection of his poems translated to Russian.

== Selected bibliography ==
- The Teacher (Maudlin House, 2025)
- The Last Song of the World (BOA Editions, 2024)
- The Magic Words (TarcherPerigee, 2024)
- The Swallows of Lunetto (Maudlin House, 2022)
- The Dark Heart of Every Wild Thing, (Platypus Press, 2020)
- The Crossing (Cider Press Review, 2018)
- Vincent (Cider Press Review, 2015)
- Inheritance (Cider Press Review, 2014)
- Fugue for Other Hands (Cider Press Review, 2013)
