= 2001 Greyhound bus attack =

Violent attack near Manchester, Tennessee

- Location: 35°23′52″N 85°59′24″W; Manchester, Tennessee, U.S.
- Date: October 3, 2001; 25 years ago c. 4 a.m. (UTC-05:00)
- Attack type: Slashing, vehicle-ramming attack
- Weapon: Utility knife
- Deaths: 6 (including the perpetrator)
- Injuries: 22 (1 by slashing)
- Perpetrator: Damir Igrić
- Motive: Unknown

On October 3, 2001, a vehicle-ramming attack took place in Coffee County, Tennessee, United States. On-board of a Greyhound Lines bus, 29-year-old passenger Damir Igrić injured the bus driver with a utility knife, before steering the bus into oncoming traffic. Six people, including Igrić, died as a result of the crash.

== Details of the attack ==
The Federal Bureau of Investigation established that Igrić had boarded the Greyhound bus in Chicago. The bus was carrying 39 passengers at the time, and was travelling from Chicago to its final destination of Orlando, Florida. The driver, Garfield Sands, from Marietta, Georgia, drove the route from Indianapolis to Atlanta. Igrić approached Sands at least three times, and asked how much time remained until the next stop. Sands advised Igrić that they would be making a stop in Manchester, and that he should go back to his seat. At 4 a.m., while the bus was traveling on Interstate 24 near Manchester, Igrić approached Sands for the final time. He did not say anything, but produced a sharp object and attempted to slash Sands' throat. Igrić then grabbed the steering wheel, causing the bus to crash.

Sands managed to survive both the attempted murder and the ensuing crash. His doctor was later able to describe his version of the attack:

He said that this fellow a couple of times, even after he made the announcement of when the next layover was, came up and asked him about routing and times, then the last time he came up again and this time without saying anything he just attacked him and cut his neck. Then he pushed the driver out of the way and took the wheel himself and drove it off the road.

A passenger named Carly Rinearson was sitting in the seat directly behind the driver and encountered Igrić numerous times in the hours before the attack.

This guy approached me and asked me what time it was and then asked for my seat. When I refused he then went back to his seat at the back of the bus. Then an hour later he came up with a small knife or pocketknife and just reached around and slit the driver's throat.

The bus rolled over with the driver's side on top; Igrić toppled through the windshield and died on impact. Five other people also died in the crash. The driver was able to crawl out the window and run about 200 yards (180 m) up the highway to get help. The 39 passengers of the bus were all sleeping at the time and were all injured in various ways. Twenty-one passengers were treated at hospitals and released. Nine were hospitalized in stable condition, and three were in critical condition. The five deceased victims were identified as 29-year-old Matthew Hawkins of Pierceton, Indiana, 52-year-old Tommy Montgomery of Hunstville, Alabama, 75-year-old Marian Nalls of Euclid, Ohio, 73-year-old Amelia Nerio of Lake Wales, Florida and 68-year-old Fannie Jones of Stone Mountain, Georgia.

== Greyhound response ==
Media attention to the attack was intense, with suggestions of terrorist activity. The United States was on edge, as the event happened less than a month after the September 11 attacks. A temporary nationwide shutdown of the Greyhound bus service was put into effect.

No extra security measures were immediately taken in response to this incident. However, following a very similar incident almost a year later, Greyhound Lines installed partitions on most of its newer coaches that, even if forced open, would prevent someone from easily reaching the driver directly.

== Attacker ==
Igrić was born in 1972 in Slavonski Brod, Yugoslavia (now Croatia). During his late teenage years he trained as a locksmith in vocational school. He joined the Croatian army in 1991, when he was 19, to fight in the Croatian War of Independence. He was discharged in 1993, after what the ambassador of Croatia, Ivan Grdešić, described as "violent behavior and substance abuse... he was connected with crimes in Croatia." It was later suspected that Igrić had post-traumatic stress disorder from his experiences in the war.

Igrić briefly worked as a bartender in Slavonski Brod before taking a position as a waiter for a US-based cruise ship line. He entered the United States through the city of Miami, Florida during March 1999, on a 30-day transit visa. Igrić overstayed the visa by two years, convincing US immigration officials he had relatives in Florida and New York. He worked in a restaurant in New York City before the Greyhound incident. Igrić had a long history of mental illness and was reportedly living homeless in Chicago.

== See also ==
- Killing of Tim McLean, another knife attack on a Greyhound bus
