= Karl Merrill =

American farmer (1900–1984)

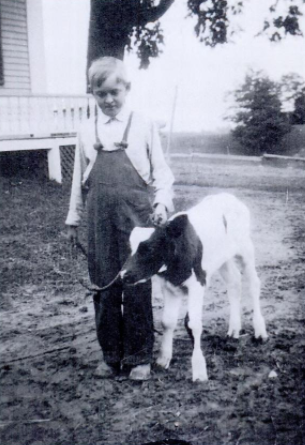
- A ten-year-old Karl Merrill with "Old Trina," around 1910
- Born: September 1, 1900; Gray, Maine, U.S.
- Died: December 2, 1984 (aged 84); Yarmouth, Maine, U.S.
- Occupation: Farmer
- Spouse: Annie F. Merrill (1932–1977; her death)
- Parent(s): George Edwin Merrill; Mary Evelyn Merrill

Karl Herbert Merrill (September 1, 1900 – December 2, 1984) was an American farmer who established the Trina line of Holstein cow in 1961, beginning with Trina Redstone Marvel, or "Old Trina", which was traced back sixteen years to one of the first cows imported into the United States from the Netherlands. Today, there are thirty generations of Trina Holstein offspring.

Merrill owned Springdale Farm, in Gray, Maine, established by Merrill's paternal grandfather, George T. Merrill (died 1885), which is still in operation.

== Life and career ==
Merrill was born to George Edwin Merrill and Mary Evelyn Merrill (of a second Merrill family). He was their second known child, after George (1893–1929).

He attended school in Gray, and graduated from Hebron Academy in 1918. He went on to own Springdale Farm for forty years. It was renamed Wilsondale Farm when the Wilson family purchased it in 1961.

In 1932, the year that his father died, Merrill married Annie F. Merrill (of a third Merrill family).

== Death ==
Merrill died on December 2, 1984, aged 84. He is interred in Gray Village Cemetery, beside his wife, who predeceased him by seven years.
