= Mary Louise Graffam =

Christian missionary (1871–1921)

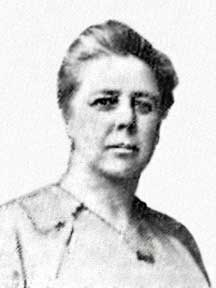
- Born: May 11, 1871; Monson, Maine, United States
- Died: August 17, 1921 (aged 50); Sivas, Ottoman Empire
- Occupations: Christian missionary and witness to the Armenian genocide

Mary Louise Graffam (May 11, 1871 – August 17, 1921) was an American teacher, high school principal, Christian missionary, and an important witness to the Armenian genocide. In 1915 she was deported and is considered a victim of the Armenian genocide.

== Life ==
Mary Louise Graffam was born in Monson, Maine. Her father was a farmer and her mother died at the age of forty-one shortly after Mary Graffam's graduation from high school. At the age of five, she and her family moved to Andover, Massachusetts.

She was raised in the Christian faith with her sister Winona. As a teenager, a religious experience moved Graffam join the local church and take part in services. While at Oberlin College, a school known for its missionary training, Graffam began studying to become a foreign missionary. After graduating in 1894, she taught in various schools in Massachusetts, New Jersey, and Washington D.C. She failed to go to Japan to become a missionary. However, in 1901 she was sent to Sivas, Ottoman Empire to be in charge of Female Education in the mission post of American Board of Commissioners for Foreign Missions of the village.

When she arrived in the Ottoman Empire, she was thirty-one years old. She eventually became the principal of the girls' high school in Sivas, where she taught algebra and geometry. As a supervisor of schools in the neighboring villages, she was also a teacher of Bible studies and trigonometry at the Sivas Teachers College. She became fluent in Armenian and was conversational in Turkish and French. She kept her post as a teacher until the start of World War I and the eventual culmination of the Armenian genocide.

Shortly after her 50th birthday, Graffam noticed a lump in her breast. She monitored it for six weeks, and finally agreed to have it removed. A Near East Relief (NER) Armenian physician, Dr. Hekimyan, conducted the procedure. Graffam was under the constant care of two NER nurses, and the medical team agreed that her surgery had been successful. Unfortunately, on the fourth day, her fever increased, her pulse was racing, and later she developed acute nephritis. She died four days later. Mary Graffam was much loved and highly respected in her community. Her colleague, Nina Rice, described her funeral as “touching . . . attended by crowds of poor people and orphans, and by government officials and a military escort. The people feel themselves sheep without a shepherd, and we have much to do to keep up their morale.”

== Armenian genocide ==
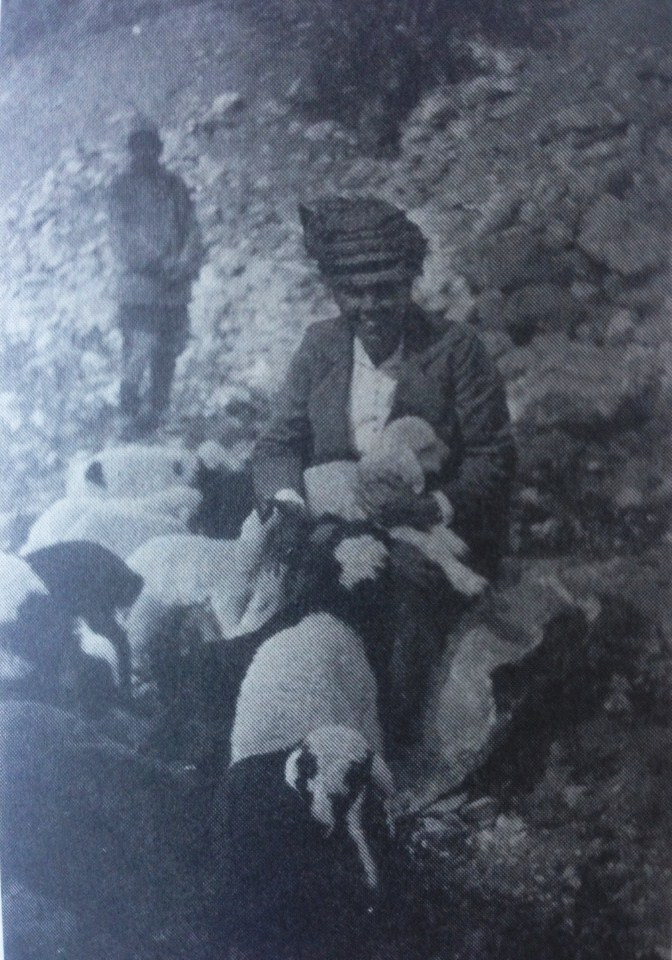
Mary Graffam in the countryside of the Ottoman Empire

Mary Louise Graffam was in Sivas when the Armenian genocide started. In its early stages, Graffam witnessed the arrests of the Armenian male population. She noted that the "Turks told us that if the men were not given up, the houses would be burned and the families would be hung in front of them." She also states that the photographs of weapons used to depict the Armenians as criminals were false, and that "Turkish ammunition had been added" to make a stronger case. When the deportations began, Graffam was also deported along with her students on July 7, 1915, as part of a convoy that consisted of 2,000 Armenians. The gendarmes who were assigned to protect the convoy gave guns and ammunition to local Kurdish groups who eventually robbed the deportees and abducted some of the girls. Some Kurdish groups were throwing stones at the Armenian deportees. While marching, she saw deportees shot dead when attempting to drink water from a nearby river. She had also received reports that there was a "valley of corpses". Mary Graffam described the road leading to Malatya, where she was prevented by Turkish gendarmes from going any further:

When we approached the bridge over Tokma Su it was a certainly fearful sight. As far as the eye could see over the plain was this real slow moving line of oxcarts. For hours not a drop of water on the road and the sun pouring down its very hottest. As we went on we began to see the dead from yesterday's company and the weak began to fall by the way...I piled as many as I could on our wagons and our pupils both boys and girls, worked like heroes.

When Graffam returned to Sivas in August 1915, she wrote to her family and friends in America who were awaiting to hear updates on the situation. In Sivas, Graffam was overwhelmed with the care-taking of Armenian orphans. She was also entrusted to hide and bury financial records and jewelry that Armenians had given her for safekeeping and to transfer valuable goods to safer locations. Graffam also hid Armenian girls who were to be abducted into Muslim households. In order not to attract the attention of officials, Graffam secretly hid hundreds of girls by placing them with families in neighboring towns. In 1916, she appealed to ABCFM Treasurer William W. Peet:

I must have much money or these half-sick women and children will perish with hunger and cold. Then there is Zara, Kangal, and Tokat and other places in the same condition.

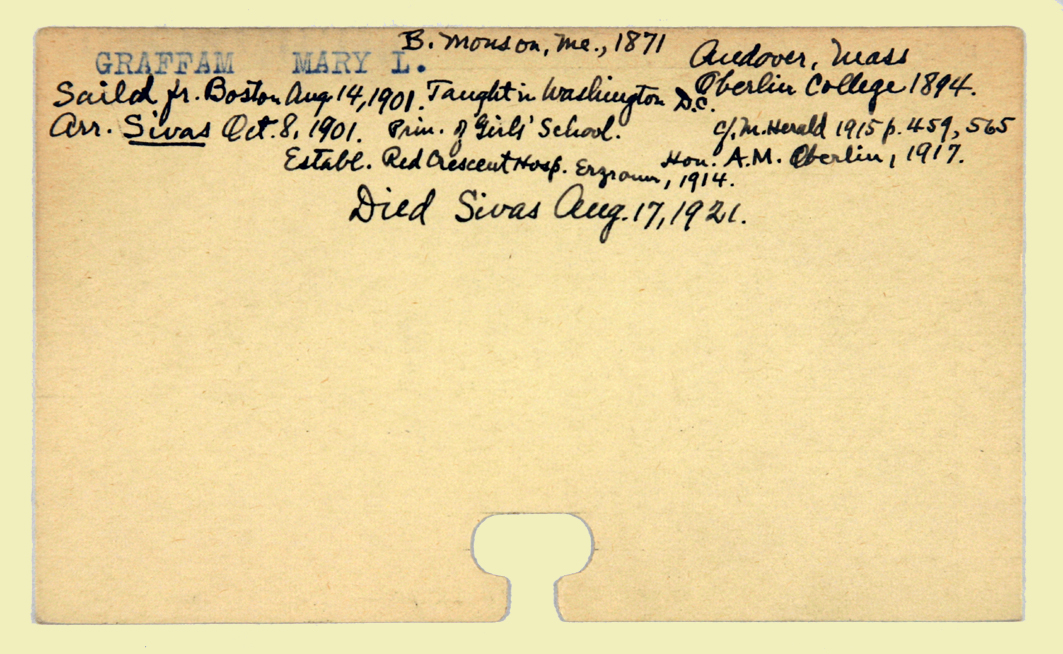
Personnel card of Mary Louise Graffam

After the Ottoman government cut off diplomatic ties with the American government due to America's involvement in World War I, Mary Graffam managed to remain in Sivas. Graffam wrote in a letter to U.S. Commissioner Lewis Heck, dated January 27, 1919, about the forceful conversions of Armenian orphaned girls into Islam:

Some weeks ago a crowd of Armenian girls who had been in the Turkish orphanage here were told that unless they become wholly Islam and absolutely denied all Armenian relatives and acquaintances that they would be put into the street. Upon that most girls fled to us and are working in our factory."

Mary Graffam wrote an account of her experiences in 1919, titling it her "Own Story."

Graffam was also a strong advocate of an independent Armenia where she and others argued would free the Armenians from "Turkish domination."

== See also ==
- Witnesses and testimonies of the Armenian genocide
