= Ben H. Williams =

- Eleven Blind Leaders by B. H. Williams (Industrial Workers of the World publishing bureau)
- Born: 1877; Monson, Maine, U.S.
- Died: 1964 (aged 86–87)
- Occupation: Labor leader

Benjamin Hayes Williams (1877-1964) was a leader of the Industrial Workers of the World.

== Life ==
Ben Williams was born in 1877 in Monson, Maine and named after president Rutherford B. Hayes. In 1888, he moved with his mother to Bertrand, Nebraska and started working as a printing apprentice.

Williams graduated from Tabor College in 1904 with a bachelor's degree. While at Tabor, he played on the football team, edited a campus magazine, and was president of the Phi Delta Literary Society.

He joined the Industrial Workers of the World in 1905 and from 1909 to 1917 edited the IWW's publication, Solidarity.

Williams published newspaper articles and authored several works on labor movement.

He died in 1964.
