= Jeanne Marie Beaumont =

American poet

- Education: Eastern College (BA); Columbia University (MFA)
- Occupation: Poet
- Website: www.jeannemariebeaumont.com

Jeanne Marie Beaumont is an American poet and author of five poetry collections: Lessons with Scissors, Letters from Limbo, Burning of the Three Fires, Curious Conduct, and Placebo Effects. Her verse play Asylum Song, had its premiere at HERE Arts in NYC in spring of 2019. Her work has appeared in Boston Review, Barrow Street (magazine), Colorado Review, Court Green, Harper’s, Harvard Review, Manhattan Review, The Nation, New American Writing, Ploughshares, Poetry Northwest, Witness, and World Literature Today. Her poems have also been featured on The Writer's Almanac with Garrison Keillor.

Beaumont was the co-editor of American Letters & Commentary from 1992 to 2000 and was a judge for the 2011 Cider Press Review Book Award.

In 2006, San Francisco film-maker Jay Rosenblatt, made a film based on her poem "Afraid So" as narrated by Garrison Keillor. The film has been shown at several major international film festivals and was included on a program of Rosenblatt's work screened at the Museum of Modern Art in October 2010.

== Personal life ==
Beaumont grew up in the suburban Philadelphia area and moved to New York City in 1983. She earned her B.A. from Eastern College and an M.F.A. in Writing from Columbia University. She has taught at Rutgers University and at the 92nd Street Y. She served as the Director of The Frost Place Advanced Seminar from 2006 to 2010 and served on the faculty for the Stonecoast MFA Program in Creative Writing.

== Honors and awards ==
- 1996 National Poetry Series, for Placebo Effects, Chosen by William Matthews
- 2003 The Greensboro Review literary award for poetry
- 2009 Dana Award for poetry
- Finalist for the Writer's League of Texas Book Award, 2011

== Published works ==
- Lessons with Scissors, Tiger Bark Press, 2024. ISBN 978-0-9976305-0-3
- Letters from Limbo, CavanKerry Press, Ltd. 2016. ISBN 978-1-933880-59-4
- Burning of the Three Fires, BOA Editions, Ltd. 2010. ISBN 978-1-934414-40-8
- Curious Conduct. BOA Editions, Ltd. 2004. ISBN 978-1-929918-51-5.
- Placebo Effects. W.W. Norton. 1999. ISBN 978-0-393-31891-3.

=== Anthologies edited ===
- Jeanne Marie Beaumont; Claudia Carlson, eds. (2003). The Poets' Grimm: 20th century poems from Grimm fairy tales. Story Line Press. ISBN 978-1-58654-027-2.
- Jeanne Marie Beaumont; Anna Rabinowitz, eds. (1999). Elliptical poets: new school or new spin? and much more. American Letters & Commentary, Inc.

=== Anthology publications ===
- Don't Leave Hungry: Fifty Years of Southern Poetry Review (University of Arkansas Press, 2009)
- When She Named Fire: An Anthology of Contemporary Poetry by American Women (Autumn House Press, 2009)
- Good Poems for Hard Times (Viking, 2005)
- Starting Today: 100 Poems for Obama's First 100 Days (University of Iowa Press, 2010)
- The Year's Best Fantasy and Horror 2007 (St. Martin's Griffin Press, 2007, ISBN 0-312-36942-5)
- Blues for Bill: A Tribute to William Matthews (University of Akron Pr., 2005)
- Poetry Daily: 366 Poems from the World's Most Popular Poetry Website (Sourcebooks, Inc, 2003)
