= Murder of Yang Xin =

2009 murder of Chinese student at Virginia Tech

Yang Xin
- 杨欣
- Born: Beijing, China
- Cause of death: Decapitation

On January 21, 2009, Zhu Haiyang (朱海洋), a graduate student from Ningbo, China, decapitated another graduate student, Yang Xin (杨欣), at Virginia Tech.

Zhu asked Yang out; however, Yang already had a boyfriend whom she intended to marry. After learning about this, Zhu attacked Yang and beheaded her. Zhu was then sentenced to life in prison for murder.

== Background ==
Zhu Haiyang was 25 years old and Yang Xin was 22 at the time of her death.

=== Yang Xin ===
On January 8, 2009, Yang Xin, from Beijing, arrived to Virginia Tech in Blacksburg to study for a master's degree in accounting.

Yang went to social events with other international students and had settled in and started making friends. She was described as a "sweet young woman".

=== Zhu Haiyang ===
Zhu Haiyang
- 朱海洋
- Born: Ningbo, Zhejiang, China
- Known for: Decapitating Yang Xin
- Conviction: Murder
- Penalty: Life imprisonment

Details
- Victims: Yang Xin (杨欣)
- Date: January 21, 2009 7 p.m EST
- Country: United States
- State: Virginia
- Location: Virginia Tech
- Weapon: Butcher knife

Zhu was from Ningbo, China. He pursued a PhD in agricultural and applied economics at Virginia Tech, starting in August 2008.

Zhu was initially helping Yang adapt to campus life.

Zhu had fallen in love with Yang and even wrote a love letter (found in his dormitory) expressing his deep affection for her. It expressed that Yang Xin was beautiful and that Zhu would treasure her forever. Zhu had also asked Yang to be his girlfriend.

But on the morning of January 20, 2009, Yang rejected Zhu as Yang already had a boyfriend she was planning to marry. In a letter titled "Will", Zhu said he was heartbroken by Yang's rejection and that Yang's fiance could not compare to Zhu's background and education. Zhu also wrote that Yang should have seen that Zhu would have been the best husband for her.

== Murder ==
On January 21, 2009, Wednesday morning, Zhu purchased an 8-inch butcher knife which he used to murder Yang along with a claw hammer and two other knives. After buying the weapons, Zhu called Yang a dozen times.

On January 21, around 7:00 PM Wednesday night, Zhu attacked Yang with a knife and decapitated her while the two were having coffee at the Au Bon Pain restaurant at the Graduate Life Center.

Yang had many wounds on her arms and hands as she was trying to fight Zhu. Eventually, Yang fell and Zhu cut off her head. When the police arrived, Zhu was covered in blood and holding Yang's head.

== Aftermath ==
=== Police investigation ===
Nicole Irvine, from the Virginia Tech police department said she saw Yang's body lying on the ground and Zhu walking towards her with Yang's head in his hand. When the police ordered Zhu to put his hands in the air, he dropped the head to the ground. Irvine found a kitchen knife on the cafe table, and Zhu told her that he had a hammer and more knives in his backpack.

Corey Cox, a cafe worker who witnessed the attack, said that Zhu lunged at Yang and cut her head off with a knife. Zhu was on top of Yang, and while he was cutting off her head, Zhu was staring at Yang with a "blank, determined" look on his face. Cox hid behind the counter and called 911 while his manager and the other customers fled from the shop.

Seven other cafe workers informed the police that Zhu and Yang were not arguing prior to the attack.

Investigators asked to search Zhu's phone, computer, and diaries for clues on the attack.

Kim Beisecker, the director of the Cranwell International Center, said that Zhu had only recently met Yang. Zhu was listed as one of Ms. Yang's emergency contacts.

Zhu's landlord, Will Segar, said that Zhu behaved strangely and belligerently. For example, Zhu rented an apartment with two other people and had refused to turn up the heat in the apartment, which caused the pipes to freeze and break. Segar then installed a thermostat, but Zhu then shut down the heater.

Virginia Tech had a security notification system that was set up after the 2007 shooting on campus. On Wednesday night, when Zhu decapitated Yang, this system sent about 60,000 emergency notifications to 30,000 subscribers in half an hour. The director of the Office of Recovery and Support at Virginia Tech said the experience was "retraumatizing" following the 2007 shooting.

Prosecutors described Zhu as "obsessed" and "jilted". While Zhu was held at the Montgomery County jail, he was also evaluated at a mental hospital.

=== Sentence ===
Zhu was charged with first-degree murder and sentenced on April 19, 2010.

Montgomery County Judge Gino Williams certified the murder charges against Zhu. In December 2009, the plea hearing was held in Christiansburg, Virginia.

In April 2010, Montgomery Circuit Judge Robert Turk sentenced Zhu Haiyang to life imprisonment without parole.

Attorney Brad Finch described Zhu's murder as "extremely brutal" and was pleased that Turk sentenced Zhu to life in prison.

In prison, Zhu wrote a letter saying that Yang's rejecting him "forced" him to kill her as Zhu loved her so much.

== Reactions ==
The Virginia Tech campus was shocked by Zhu's crimes. Virginia Tech president Charles W. Steger wrote in a letter to the campus community that their hearts "go out to the victim [Yang Xin] and her family". It was the first murder on the campus since the 2007 Virginia Tech shooting.

== See also ==
- Virginia Tech shooting, massacre that occurred on the same campus Virginia Tech, perpetrated by Seung-Hui Cho
- Killing of Tim McLean, another decapitation case, perpetrated by Vince Weiguang Li
