= John Scurfield =

John M. Scurfield, QC (November 27, 1951 – November 14, 2009), styled The Honourable Mr. Justice was a Canadian judge.

Scurfield was born in Manitou, Manitoba, the second of four children to his late parents William Edward Scurfield (a lawyer), and Cynthia May Scurfield (née Beamish). He received a Bachelor of Laws from the University of Manitoba in 1975 and was admitted to the Law Society of Manitoba the following year. He is a Past President and Life Bencher of the Law Society of Manitoba. Scurfield was appointed Queen's Counsel in 1989.

He was appointed a judge of the Manitoba Court of Queen's Bench on July 16, 2002. He replaced Madam Justice Ruth Krindle, who resigned. Prior to his appointment, he was a partner with the Winnipeg law firm of Scurfield, Tapper, Cuddy. He practiced in the areas of commercial litigation, employment law, administrative law, personal injury claims and criminal law. Throughout his career, Scurfield has undertaken arbitration and mediation of commercial and labour disputes and has acted as commissioner or commission counsel on various inquiries.
