= Peleg Chandler =

American politician

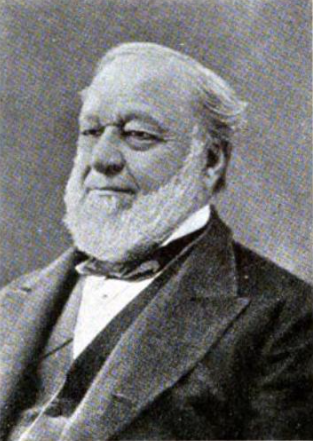

Member of the Massachusetts Governor's Council
- In office 1850

Member of the Massachusetts House of Representatives
- In office 1844–1845
- In office 1862–1863

President of the Boston Common Council
- In office 1841–1845
- Preceded by: Edward Blake
- Succeeded by: George Stillman Hillard

Personal details
- Born: Peleg Whitman Chandler; April 12, 1816 New Gloucester, Maine
- Died: May 28, 1889 (aged 73) Boston, Massachusetts
- Spouse: Martha Ann Bush (m. 1837)
- Education: Bangor Theological Seminary; Bowdoin College; Harvard Law School
- Occupation: Lawyer, politician

Peleg Whitman Chandler (April 12, 1816 – May 28, 1889) was an American lawyer, legal news reporter and editor, Boston's city attorney (solicitor), and a two-term state legislator in the Massachusetts General Court.

As City Solicitor, Chandler defended Boston's exclusion of African American students from its public schools in the legal case of Roberts v. City of Boston.

== Life ==
Chandler's father and grandfather were also named Peleg Chandler; his mother was Esther Parsons Chandler.

Born in New Gloucester, Maine, he studied at Bangor Theological Seminary and received his degree from Bowdoin College in 1834. He studied law with his father, in the law office of Theophilus Parsons, and at Harvard Law School. Chandler was admitted to the Massachusetts Bar Association in 1837, in which year he also married Martha Ann Bush, with whom he went on to have four children.

Chandler practiced law in Boston, contributed law reports to the Boston Daily Advertiser and also founded the Law Reporter journal, which was the first magazine on law to be successful in the US. He served on the Boston City Council from 1843 to 1845 and in the Massachusetts Governor's Council in 1850. He was also a member of the Massachusetts House of Representatives for 1844-1845 and 1862-1863.

In 1850, as City Solicitor, Chandler defended Boston's exclusion of African American students from its public schools in the legal case of Roberts v. City of Boston.

Chandler died at his Boston home from heart failure, after a long illness, on May 28, 1889.

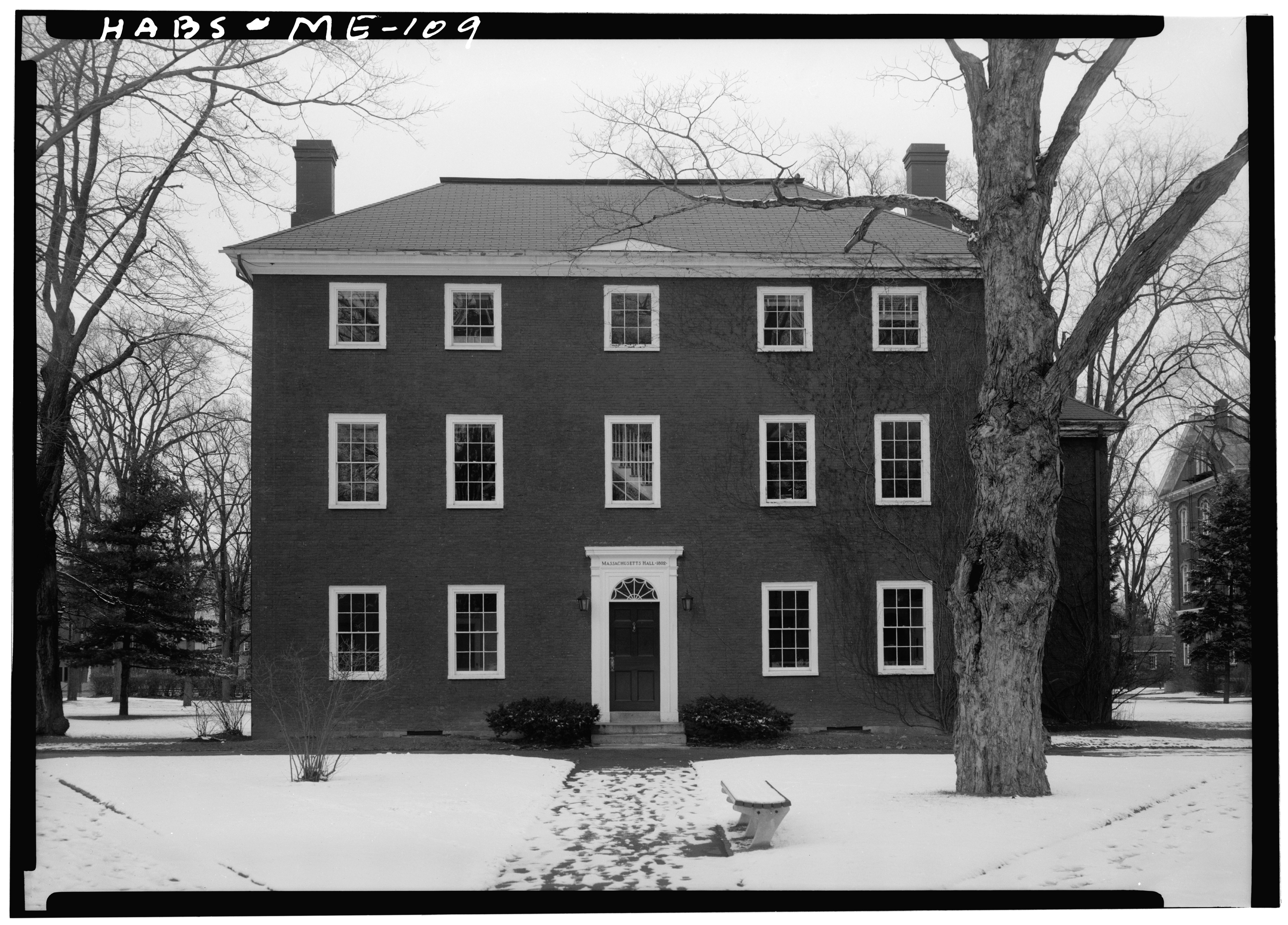
Photograph of Massachusetts Hall, Bowdoin College from the Historic American Buildings Survey

== Publications ==
Among Chandler's published writings are:

- American Criminal Trials in libraries (WorldCat catalog)
- Memoir of Governor Andrew in libraries (WorldCat catalog)
- The Morals of Freedom in libraries (WorldCat catalog)
- The Charter and Ordinances of the City of Boston in libraries (WorldCat catalog)
- A Statement in Reply to Mr. Stevenson's Letter to the Wednesday Evening Club in libraries (WorldCat catalog)
- The Bankrupt Law of the United States in libraries (WorldCat catalog)

== Philanthropy ==
In 1872, Chandler funded the refurbishment of Massachusetts Hall, Bowdoin College according to designs by A. C. Martin. The works included removal of a staircase, the creation of a first-floor recitation room and space to house the Cleaveland Cabinet of mineral and natural history specimens. Cleaveland was his father-in-law.

== Papers ==
Chandler's papers are kept several institutions including the Phillips Library, Massachusetts Historical Society, the Hayes Presidential Center, and the Bowdoin College Library.
