= New Gloucester, Maine =

Town in Maine, United States

- Town
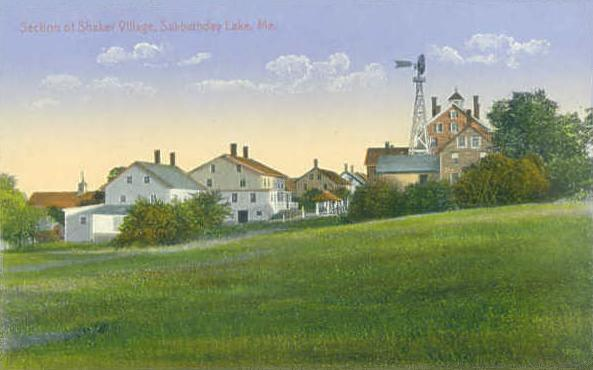
- Sabbathday Lake Shaker Village

- Seal
- Motto: "Home of the Shaker Community"
- Location in Cumberland County and the state of Maine.
- Coordinates: 43°58′57″N 70°20′42″W
- Country: United States
- State: Maine
- County: Cumberland
- Incorporated: 1774
- Villages: New Gloucester; Shaker Village; Upper Gloucester

Area
  - Total: 47.80 sq mi (123.80 km^{2})
  - Land: 47.12 sq mi (122.04 km^{2})
  - Water: 0.68 sq mi (1.76 km^{2})
- Elevation: 364 ft (111 m)

Population (2020)
  - Total: 5,676
  - Density: 120/sq mi (46.5/km^{2})
- Time zone: UTC-5 (Eastern (EST))
  - Summer (DST): UTC-4 (EDT)
- ZIP code: 04260
- Area code: 207
- FIPS code: 23-48820
- GNIS feature ID: 582619
- Website: www.newgloucester.com

New Gloucester (/ˈɡlɒstər/ GLOS-tər) is a town in Cumberland County, Maine, United States. New Gloucester is included in the Lewiston-Auburn, Maine metropolitan New England City and Town Area. It is home to the Sabbathday Lake Shaker Village, the last active Shaker village in the U.S. The town's population was 5,676 at the 2020 census.

New Gloucester is part of Maine's Portland-South Portland-Biddeford metropolitan area.

== History ==
New Gloucester was established in 1736 under a Massachusetts Bay Colony grant of a 6-square-mile (16 km^{2}) tract of land in the Maine Territory to sixty inhabitants of the Gloucester fishing village on Cape Ann. The first settlers followed the road newly bushed out from North Yarmouth and built cabins on Harris Hill between 1739 and 1742. The settlement was abandoned from 1744–1751 due to the heightened native tribe attacks during King George's War.

Settlers returned and in 1753 commenced work on a two-story, fifty-foot square blockhouse with a palisade stockade 110 feet (34 m) on a side. This was home to twelve families for six years. The men worked at clearing the surrounding 60 acres (240,000 m^{2}) of common land under the protection of two swivel guns manned by a garrison of six soldiers. One attack was made upon the fort, resulting in one scalping and two men captured. As the Native Americans gradually withdrew to Canada, the settlers moved out into their own newly built homes. The blockhouse continued to serve for worship and town affairs until the first meetinghouse was built in 1773. In 1788, the blockhouse was sold at auction for seven bushels of corn and moved to a farm in the Intervale, where it was rebuilt as a hog house.

New Gloucester was incorporated on March 8, 1774, and was named after Gloucester, Massachusetts, the native home of a large share of the early settlers.

New Gloucester became a half shire town with Portland, and the courts met here from 1791 until the organization of Oxford County in 1805, when they returned to Portland. With good soil for agriculture, the town developed as a prosperous farming community. In 1858, when the population was 1,848, other industries included six sawmills, two gristmills and two tanneries.

Sabbathday Lake Shaker Village was founded in 1783 by the United Society of True Believers at what was then called Thompson's Pond Plantation. It was formally organized on April 19, 1794. Today, the village is the last of some over two-dozen religious societies, stretching from Maine to Florida, to be operated by the Shakers themselves. It comprises 18 buildings on 1,800 acres (7.3 km^{2}) of land.

New Gloucester is home to Pineland Farms, a 5,000-acre farm and recreational property in the eastern part of the town. It is partly on the site of the former Pineland Hospital and Training Center, later named the Pineland Center that closed in 1996. In 2000, the Libra Foundation purchased Pineland Farms, and as of 2013, Pineland Farms encompassed approximately 5,000 (20.23km²) and 28 buildings. As of 2026, Pineland Farms is a working farm, diverse business campus and educational and recreational venue. Pineland Farms trails are used as cross-country ski trails, and for trail running, mountain biking, and cyclo-cross. The trails at Pineland Farms are also used for collegiate cross-country running races and training. It is the home course for Bates College and has been the host site for the Maine state college championships.

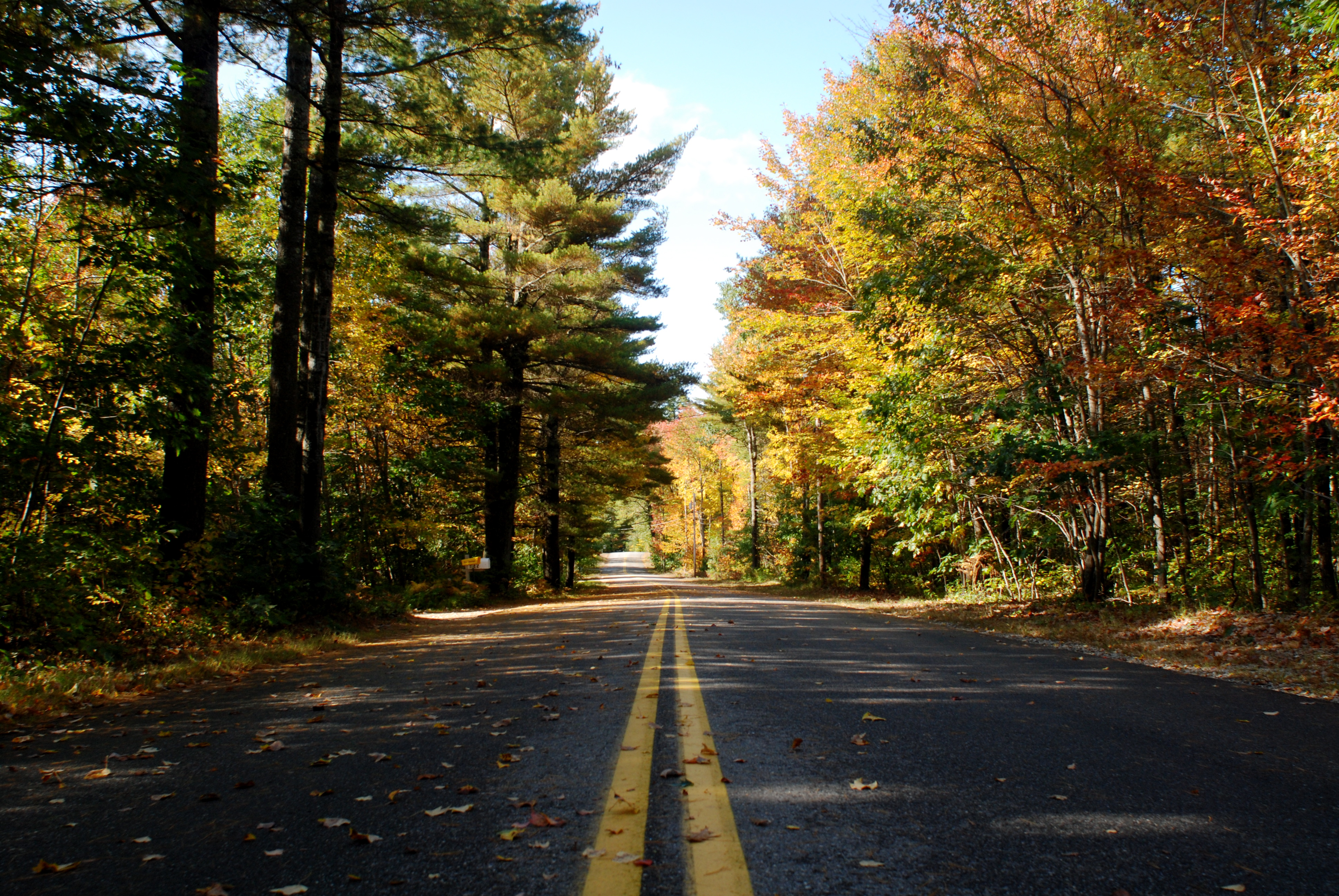
Mayall Road

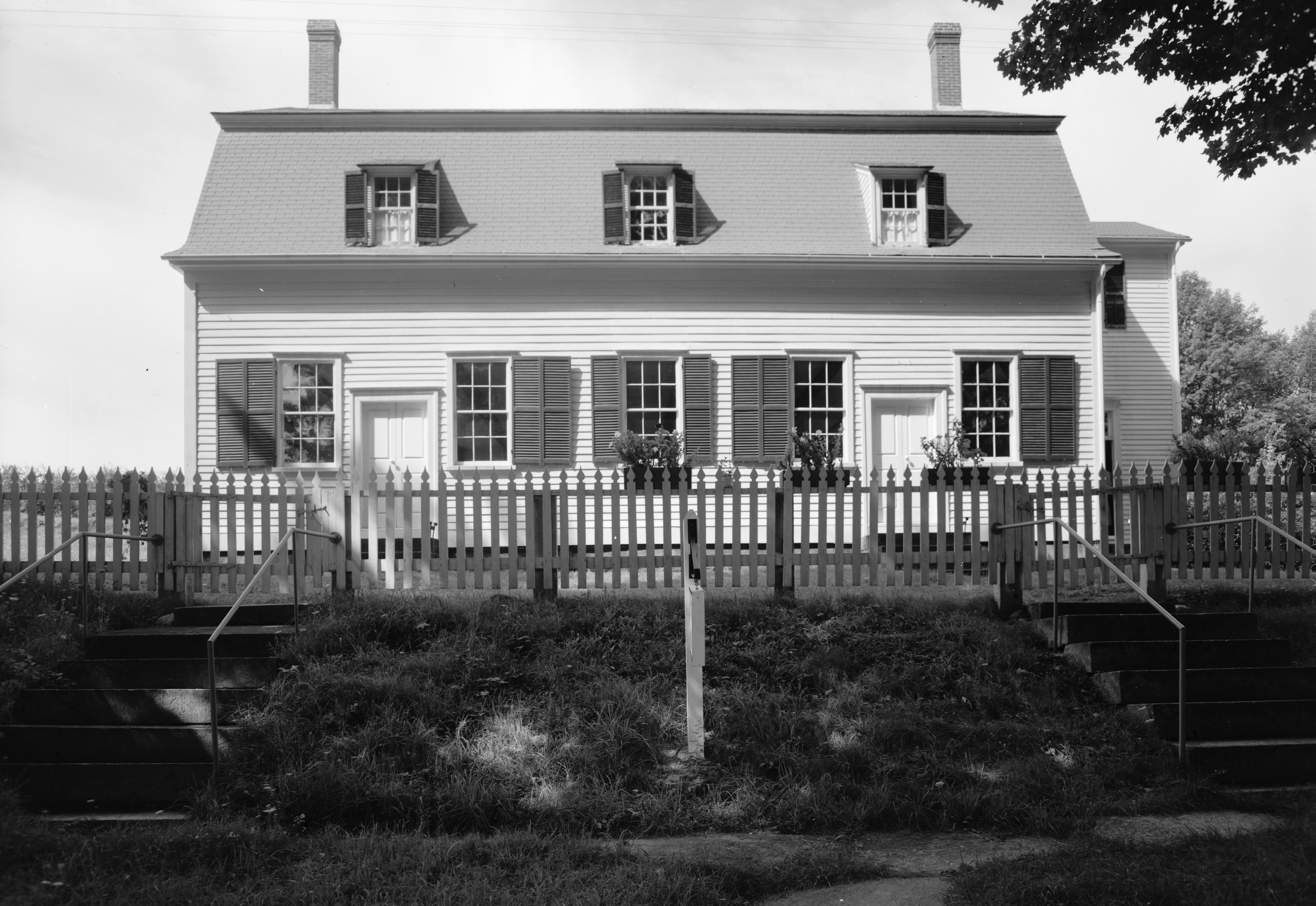
Shaker Meetinghouse, Sabbathday Lake Shaker Village

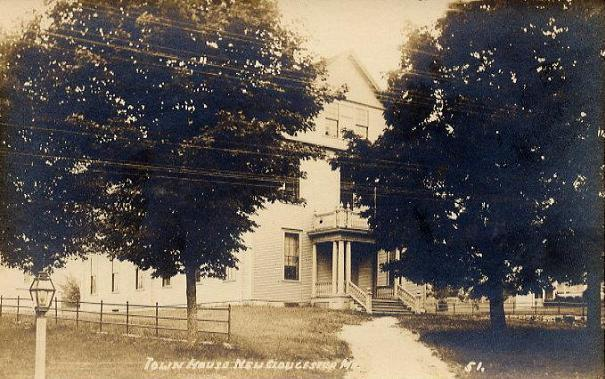
Town Hall c. 1915

== Geography ==
According to the United States Census Bureau, the town has a total area of 47.80 square miles (123.80 km^{2}), of which 47.12 square miles (122.04 km^{2}) is land and 0.68 square miles (1.76 km^{2}) is water. New Gloucester is drained by the Royal River.

The town is served by Interstate 95, U.S. Route 202 and state routes 4, 26 and 231. It is bordered by the town of Raymond to the west, Poland to the northwest, the city of Auburn to the northeast, Durham to the east, Pownal and North Yarmouth to the southeast, and Gray to the southwest.

== Amenities ==
The privately owned, unattended Cliff Dow Airport is located on Highview Drive, two miles southwest of New Gloucester, to the east of Interstate 95. Its FAA identifier is 54ME, and it was activated in 2006. Its unpaved runway headings are 5 (for landings) and 23 (for takeoffs) with an AMSL elevation of 415 feet. Its area control center is Boston Center, while its flight service station is Bangor.

=== Climate ===
This climatic region is typified by large seasonal temperature differences, with warm to hot (and often humid) summers and cold (sometimes severely cold) winters. According to the Köppen Climate Classification system, New Gloucester has a humid continental climate, abbreviated "Dfb" on climate maps.

Climate data for New Gloucester, Maine
Month	Jan	Feb	Mar	Apr	May	Jun	Jul	Aug	Sep	Oct	Nov	Dec	Year
Mean daily maximum °F (°C)	29.4 (−1.4)	33.5 (0.8)	41.9 (5.5)	53.6 (12.0)	65.1 (18.4)	74.0 (23.3)	79.1 (26.2)	78.5 (25.8)	70.0 (21.1)	58.0 (14.4)	45.9 (7.7)	34.8 (1.6)	54.5 (12.5)
Mean daily minimum °F (°C)	12.6 (−10.8)	15.9 (−8.9)	24.0 (−4.4)	34.9 (1.6)	44.7 (7.1)	54.1 (12.3)	59.7 (15.4)	58.7 (14.8)	50.7 (10.4)	40.1 (4.5)	31.0 (−0.6)	19.8 (−6.8)	37.2 (2.9)
Average precipitation inches (mm)	4.01 (102)	3.14 (80)	4.49 (114)	4.27 (108)	3.88 (99)	3.79 (96)	3.63 (92)	3.24 (82)	3.57 (91)	4.23 (107)	4.55 (116)	4.21 (107)	47.01 (1,194)
Average snowfall inches (cm)	21.2 (54)	16.5 (42)	19.9 (51)	4.8 (12)	0 (0)	0 (0)	0 (0)	0 (0)	0 (0)	0.1 (0.25)	3.0 (7.6)	18.3 (46)	83.8 (213)
Source 1:
Source 2:

== Demographics ==
Historical population
Census	Pop.	Note	%±
1790	1,358		—
1800	1,378		1.5%
1810	1,649		19.7%
1820	1,658		0.5%
1830	1,682		1.4%
1840	1,946		15.7%
1850	1,848		−5.0%
1860	1,654		−10.5%
1870	1,496		−9.6%
1880	1,382		−7.6%
1890	1,234		−10.7%
1900	1,162		−5.8%
1910	1,228		5.7%
1920	1,384		12.7%
1930	1,866		34.8%
1940	2,334		25.1%
1950	2,628		12.6%
1960	3,047		15.9%
1970	2,811		−7.7%
1980	3,180		13.1%
1990	3,916		23.1%
2000	4,803		22.7%
2010	5,542		15.4%
2020	5,676		2.4%

=== 2010 census ===
As of the census of 2010, there were 5,542 people, 2,092 households, and 1,534 families living in the town. The population density was 117.6 inhabitants per square mile (45.4/km^{2}). There were 2,295 housing units at an average density of 48.7 per square mile (18.8/km^{2}). The racial makeup of the town was 97.5% White, 0.3% African American, 0.1% Native American, 0.4% Asian, 0.1% from other races, and 1.6% from two or more races. Hispanic or Latino of any race were 0.8% of the population.

There were 2,092 households, of which 36.2% had children under the age of 18 living with them, 59.9% were married couples living together, 8.2% had a female householder with no husband present, 5.2% had a male householder with no wife present, and 26.7% were non-families. 18.5% of all households were made up of individuals, and 4.7% had someone living alone who was 65 years of age or older. The average household size was 2.63 and the average family size was 2.99.

The median age in the town was 39.5 years. 24.5% of residents were under the age of 18; 6.6% were between the ages of 18 and 24; 28.6% were from 25 to 44; 31.7% were from 45 to 64; and 8.5% were 65 years of age or older. The gender makeup of the town was 50.9% male and 49.1% female.

=== 2000 census ===
As of the census of 2000, there were 4,803 people, 1,761 households, and 1,313 families living in the town. The population density was 102.0 inhabitants per square mile (39.4/km^{2}). There were 1,889 housing units at an average density of 40.1 per square mile (15.5/km^{2}). The racial makeup of the town was 98.17% White, 0.23% African American, 0.06% Native American, 0.40% Asian, 0.10% Pacific Islander, 0.12% from other races, and 0.92% from two or more races. Hispanic or Latino of any race were 0.56% of the population.

There were 1,761 households, out of which 39.2% had children under the age of 18 living with them, 61.2% were married couples living together, 8.9% had a female householder with no husband present, and 25.4% were non-families. 18.6% of all households were made up of individuals, and 6.3% had someone living alone who was 65 years of age or older. The average household size was 2.71 and the average family size was 3.08.

In the town, the population was spread out, with 28.8% under the age of 18, 6.2% from 18 to 24, 35.0% from 25 to 44, 22.5% from 45 to 64, and 7.5% who were 65 years of age or older. The median age was 36 years. For every 100 females, there were 102.2 males. For every 100 females age 18 and over, there were 99.1 males.

As of a 2008 estimate, the median income for a household in the town was $60,664 and the per capita income for the town was $24,958. As of the 2000 census and the median income for a family was $57,727. Males had a median income of $35,699 versus $26,358 for females. About 4.0% of families and 5.4% of the population were below the poverty line, including 7.6% of those under age 18 and 9.3% of those age 65 or over.

== Arts and culture ==
=== Sites of interest ===
- New Gloucester Historical Society & Museum
- Sabbathday Lake Shaker Village & Museum
- Royal River Conservation Trust Intervale & Pisgah Hill Preserves
- New Gloucester Veterans Monument
- Pineland Farms

== Education ==
- Maine School Administrative District 15
- Merriconeag High School
- Collaborative School
- Wayfinder Schools

== Notable people ==
- Mildred Barker, musician, scholar, and Shaker Eldress
- Joseph Brackett, American songwriter and Shaker Elder
- Peleg Chandler, lawyer, journalist, and politician in Boston, Massachusetts
- Jonathan Greenleaf Eveleth, oil company founder
- Samuel Fessenden, abolitionist, legislator
- Samuel C. Fessenden, US congressman
- William Pitt Fessenden, US congressman, Secretary of the Treasury
- Benjamin F. Hayes, professor at Bates College
- Sara Plummer Lemmon, botanist of Western USA, namesake of Mt. Lemmon, near Tucson
- Hannah Ropes, nurse, abolitionist and writer
- Ezekiel Whitman, US congressman
