= Poet Laureate of Maine =

The poet laureate of Maine is the poet laureate for the U.S. state of Maine. The Maine state poet laureate is appointed by the governor for a 5-year term, and the program is managed by the Maine Arts Commission. The program was established in 1995 via Maine Public Law 1995, Chapter 264 and codified via Maine Revised Statutes, Title 27, Chapter 15, Subchapter 2.

== List of poets laureate ==
- Kate Barnes (1996–1999)
- Baron Wormser (2000–2005)
- Betsy Sholl (2006–2011)
- Wesley McNair (2011–2016)
- Stuart Kestenbaum (2016–2021)
- Julia Bouwsma (2021–present)

== See also ==
- Poet laureate
- List of U.S. state poets laureate
- United States Poet Laureate
