= New Meadows River =

Coordinates: 43.77147°N 69.88699°W

Location
- Country: United States

Physical characteristics
- Source
  - location: Maine

The New Meadows River is a 12-mile-long (19 km) tidal embayment in Maine at the northern end of Casco Bay. It serves as the boundary between Cumberland and Sagadahoc counties for its entire length.

It begins in a marsh on the boundary between Brunswick and Bath, less than 1 mile (1.6 km) south of Merrymeeting Bay, and proceeds southward. West Bath soon becomes the municipality to the east of the river. It passes under three bridges within its first 2 miles (3 km): Old Bath Road/Old Brunswick Road, U.S. Route 1, and Bath Road/State Road. 3.5 miles (5.6 km) south of the last bridge, Gurnet Strait branches off to the west, separating Sebascodegan Island from the mainland. The New Meadows River continues south, with the island town of Harpswell now to the west. 3.7 miles (6.0 km) south of Gurnet Strait, Winnegance Bay branches to the northeast, and the town of Phippsburg begins to occupy the east shore of the river. The river passes Cundys Harbor (within the town of Harpswell) to the west, then reaches Casco Bay between East Cundy Point to the west and Bear Island to the east.

The river is the southern terminus of the region known as Midcoast Maine.

The waters are home to Bowdoin College's club rowing team who practice out of Smith Boathouse.

== See also ==
- List of rivers of Maine
