= Cider Press Review =

American literary journal

Cider Press Review (CPR) is a small-press literary journal, published from San Diego, California, United States. It was founded in 1999 as a journal of contemporary poetry by editors Caron Andregg and Robert Wynne. The journal of poetry is published annually in print, and four times a year electronically. The Cider Press Review Book Award is an annual literary prize issued by the journal.

== Cider Press Review Book Award ==
The Cider Press Review Book Award is an annual literary prize offered by the Cider Press Review. The prize recognizes outstanding poetry manuscripts. Winners receive a $1,500 cash prize, with their manuscripts published by Cider Press. The book award has become a magnet for promising poets and well-known judges from various literary fields.

The Cider Press Review Book Award is chosen by guest judges and reviewers from various fields of poetry and literature. These participants have included Gray Jacobik, Jeanne Marie Beaumont, and David St. John.

=== Past winners ===
- 2007 Robin Chapman, Abundance
- 2008 Carol Quinn, Acetylene
- 2009 Landon Godfrey, Second-Skin Rhinestone-Spangled Nude Souffle Chiffon Gown
- 2010 Liz Robbins, Play Button
- 2011 Joseph Fasano, Fugue for Other Hands
- 2012 Lorraine Doran, Phrasebook for the Pleiades
