= Libra Foundation =

The Libra Foundation
- Founded: 1989
- Founder: Elizabeth Noyce
- Type: Charitable trust
- Location: Portland, Maine, United States of America
- Method: Donations and Grants
- Endowment: US$140 million
- Website: www.librafoundation.org

The Libra Foundation is among the largest charitable organizations in the state of Maine. Major projects include Pineland Farms, the Maine Winter Sports Center, and The MaineHealth Raising Readers program. The October Corporation is an affiliated organization with real estate holdings on behalf of the Libra Foundation.
