= Pineland Farms =

Buildings in Maine, United States

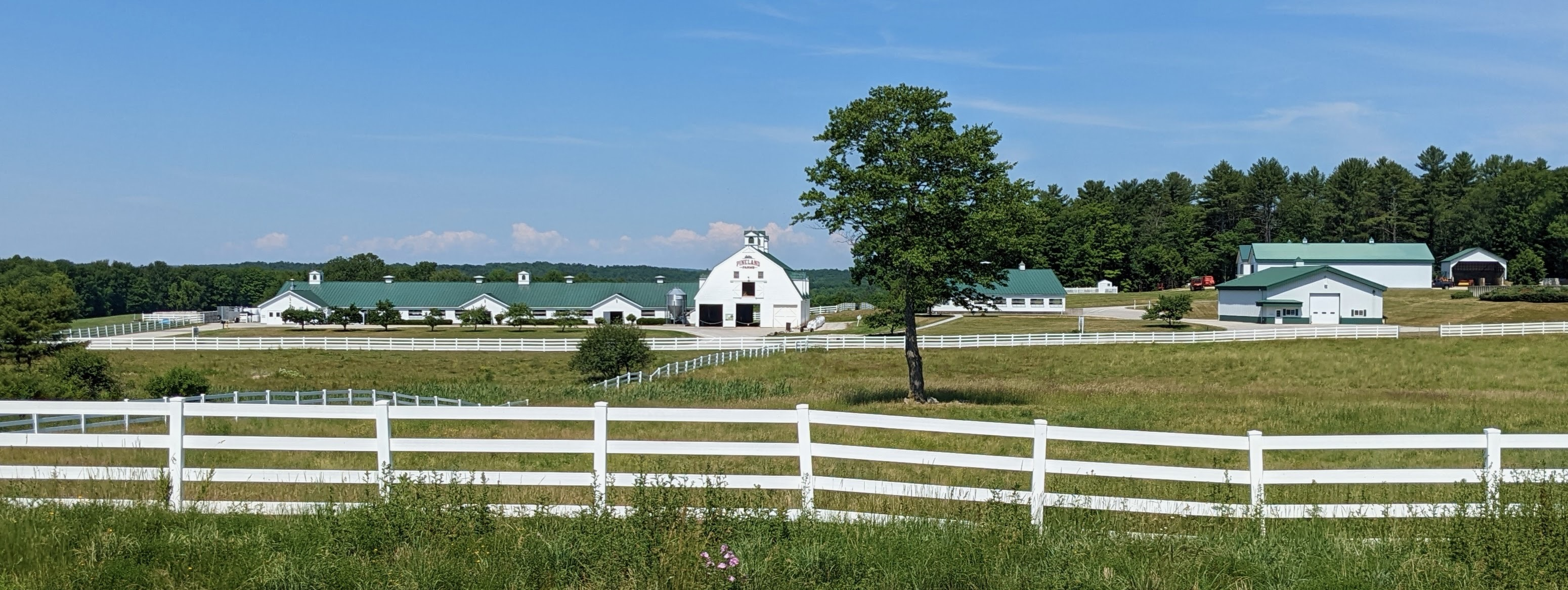
- Pineland Farms' dairy barn (left) and calf barn (right of center), 2022

- Location within Maine
- Town/City: New Gloucester
- State: Maine
- Country: United States
- Coordinates: 43.902517°N 70.259133°W
- Established: 2000 (26 years ago)
- Owner: Libra Foundation (since 2000)
- Area: 5,000 acres (20,000,000 m^{2})
- Status: Open to the public

Pineland Farms is a 5,000-acre (20,000,000 m^{2}) farm and recreational property in the eastern part of New Gloucester, Maine. It is partly on the site of the former Pineland Hospital and Training Center.

== History ==
In the early 20th century, the State of Maine purchased six farms in New Gloucester, Maine, which became known as Pineland Farms. The purpose of this purchase was to build the Maine School for the Feeble Minded on part of the land and continue farming on the rest of it.

=== The Maine School for the Feeble-Minded and Pownal State School ===
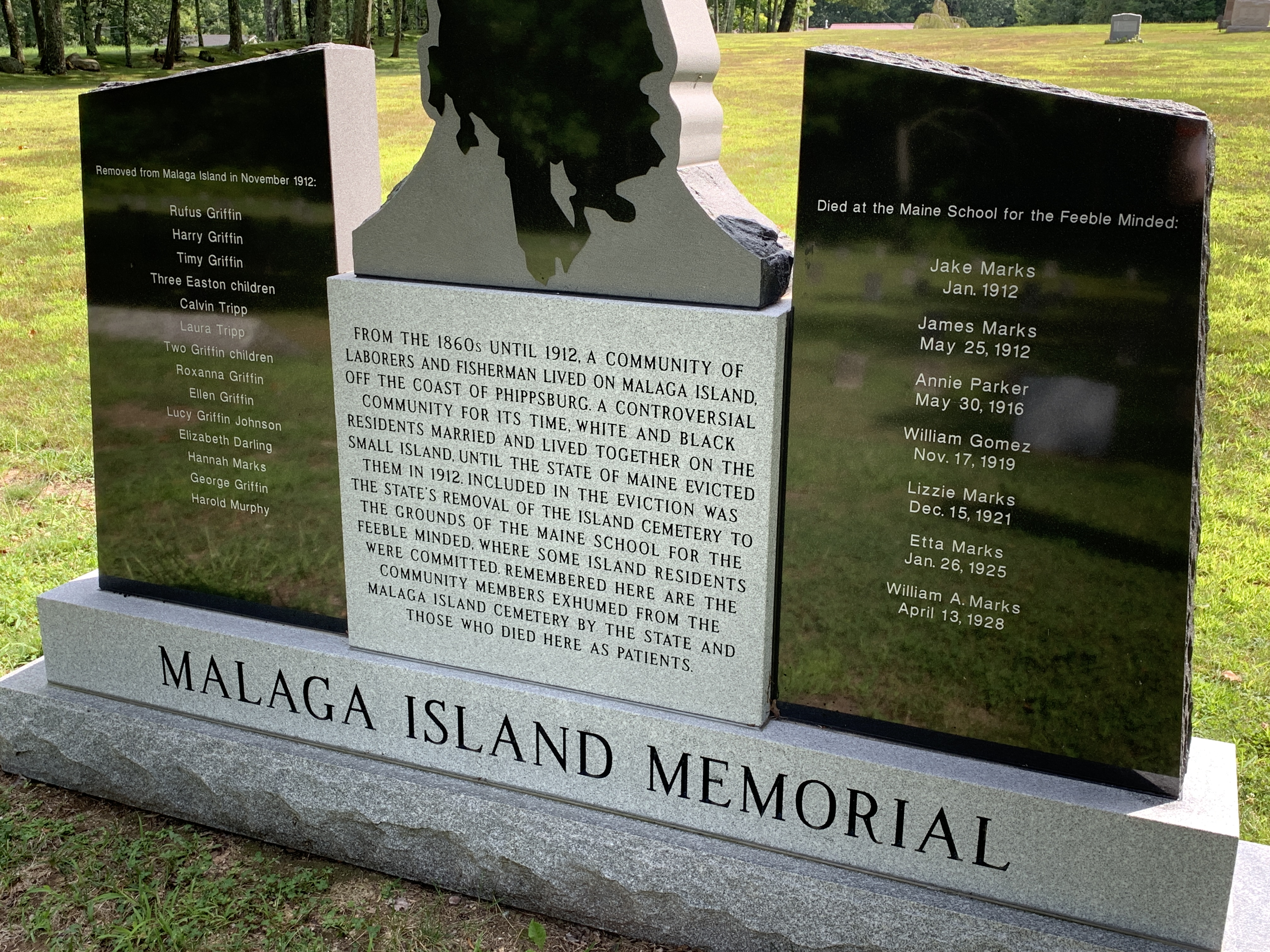
Malaga Island Memorial, Webber Cemetery

Opening in 1908, the Maine School for the Feeble-Minded was an institution that housed people who were considered mentally unfit by the standards of that day; however, during its early years, the State also placed orphans and other wards of the state at the Maine School, as no other public services existed to help them.

In 1913, a local committee expressed concerns that the State had purchased Pineland Farms solely as a commercial venture, and that the location did not meet the needs of the Maine school. The committee suggested that the State move the school to a better location.

Supporters of the Maine School, including mental health expert Dr. Walter E. Fernald and local doctor Seth C. Gordon, stated that while the agricultural fields of Pineland Farms did generate revenue, they also had therapeutic value. They would, as Gordon said, "keep these poor unfortunates employed and do them good." Maine School supporters also said that with some improvements, such as the installation of an additional artesian well, Pineland Farms could meet all the needs of its patients.

In 1912, the state of Maine removed eight residents from Malaga Island off of Phippsburg, known for its mixed-race community, and placed them at the Maine School for the Feeble-Minded, where most remained for the rest of their lives. The bodies in Malaga's cemetery were removed and reinterred near the School, at the rear of Webber Cemetery on Intervale Road, with several bodies being placed into three unmarked graves.

In 1921, a resident described as deaf mute with arsonist tendencies escaped from the Maine School. After burning two barns near North Yarmouth, the escapee was captured by local residents and returned to the school.

In 1925, Maine was the 25th state to pass a sterilization law, which stated that sterilization was permitted "for eugenic purposes or for therapeutic treatment on feebleminded and others suffering from certain forms of mental disease"; 189 patients were sterilized at the school. That year the state changed the school name to "Pownal State School". The old title, with its reference to 'feeble minded", was considered insensitive to the patients.

At its peak residency in the 1930s, the Pownal School housed an estimated 1,500 patients.

=== Pineland Center ===
In 1953, Peter W. Bowman became the superintendent of the Pownal State School, which in 1957 became the Pineland Hospital and Training Center. This name would be shortened to Pineland Center in the early 1970s. Over the next 18 years, Pineland Center received national recognition for the care of the mentally disabled.

In the 1970s, political intrusion and budget cuts ushered in a series of administrators who were poorly equipped to manage Pineland Center and advocate for its residents and underpaid staff. The facility deteriorated and quality care for its residents was largely abandoned. In 1976, due to worsening conditions and allegations of patient abuse, the Federal government placed Pineland Hospital into receivership.

As social attitudes towards the mentally disabled evolved, many Pineland Center residents were reintegrated into society. The most able of the hospital population were re-homed into apartments in the 1990s. Many advocates for the homeless noted that Maine's local transient population began to grow during this period as Pineland and other facilities released their residents. Routine care and therapy for these former residents ended and they drifted from their new homes. By June 1995, approximately sixty patients remained at Pineland Hospital.

In 1996, Pineland Center was closed.

=== Pineland Farms ===
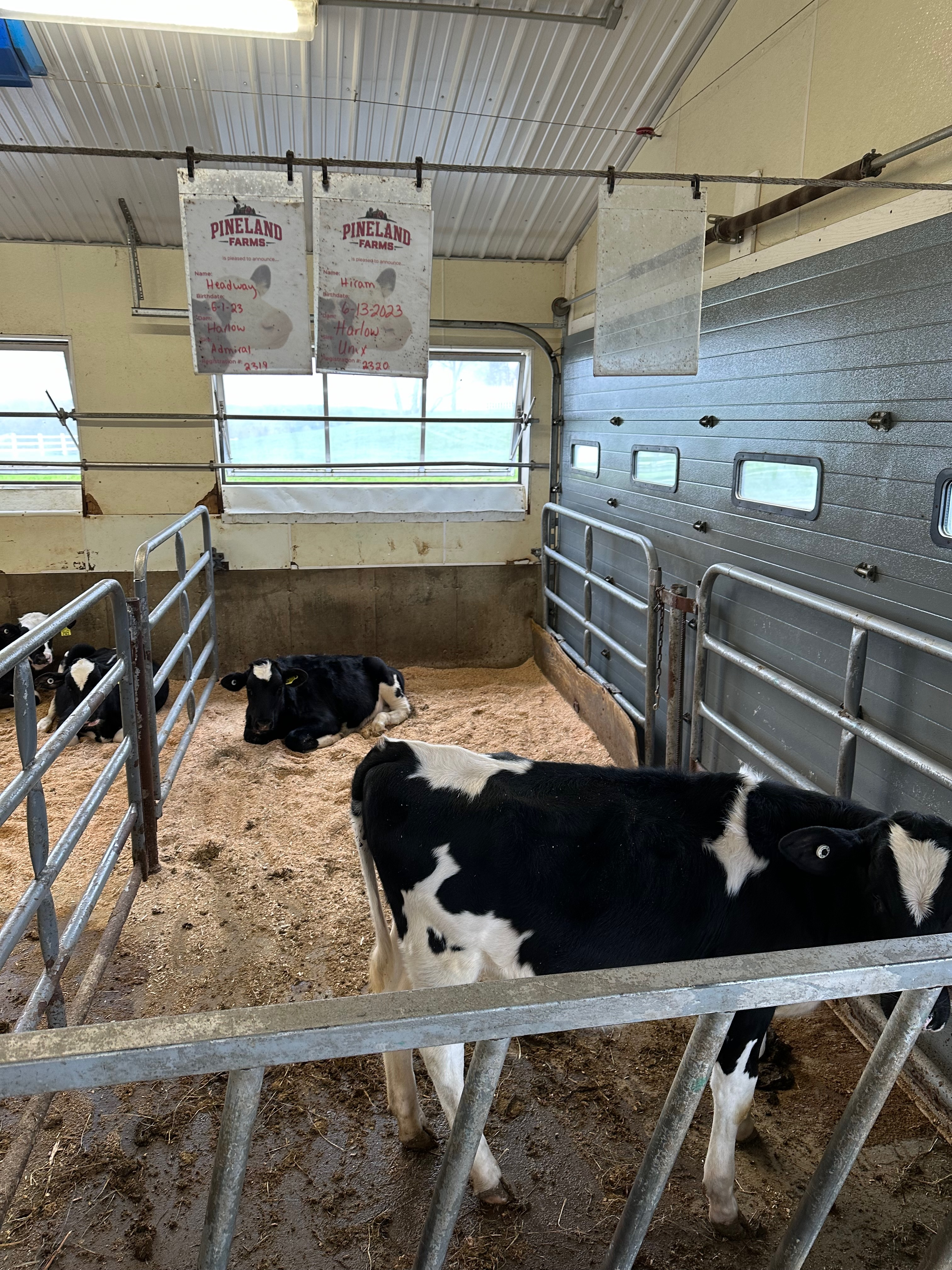
"Headway" and "Hiram", 2023 additions to the Trina line of Pineland's Holstein breed

In 2000, the Libra Foundation purchased Pineland Farms. At that time, the property included 1600 acres (6.5 km^{2}) and 28 buildings. Most of Pineland Farms was being used for agriculture. The foundation extensively renovated the property, adding businesses, trails and recreational areas.

As of 2013, Pineland Farms encompassed approximately 5,000 (20.23 km^{2}) acres and was being used primarily as a public recreation area.

==== Trail system ====
The trail system at Pineland Farms is approximately 15.5 miles (25 km) long. The Libra Foundation renovated much of Pineland Farms into cross-country ski trails, which are used for a variety of other seasonal activities, such as trail running, mountain biking, and cyclo-cross.

The Pineland Farm trails are also used for collegiate cross-country running races and training. It is the home course for Bates College and has been the host site for the Maine state college championships. Pineland Farms is also used for orienteering events, such as the National Orienteering Championships, which were held at Pineland in 2004.

Two disc golf courses are operated by Pineland Farms as part of its recreational offerings.

==== Other facilities ====
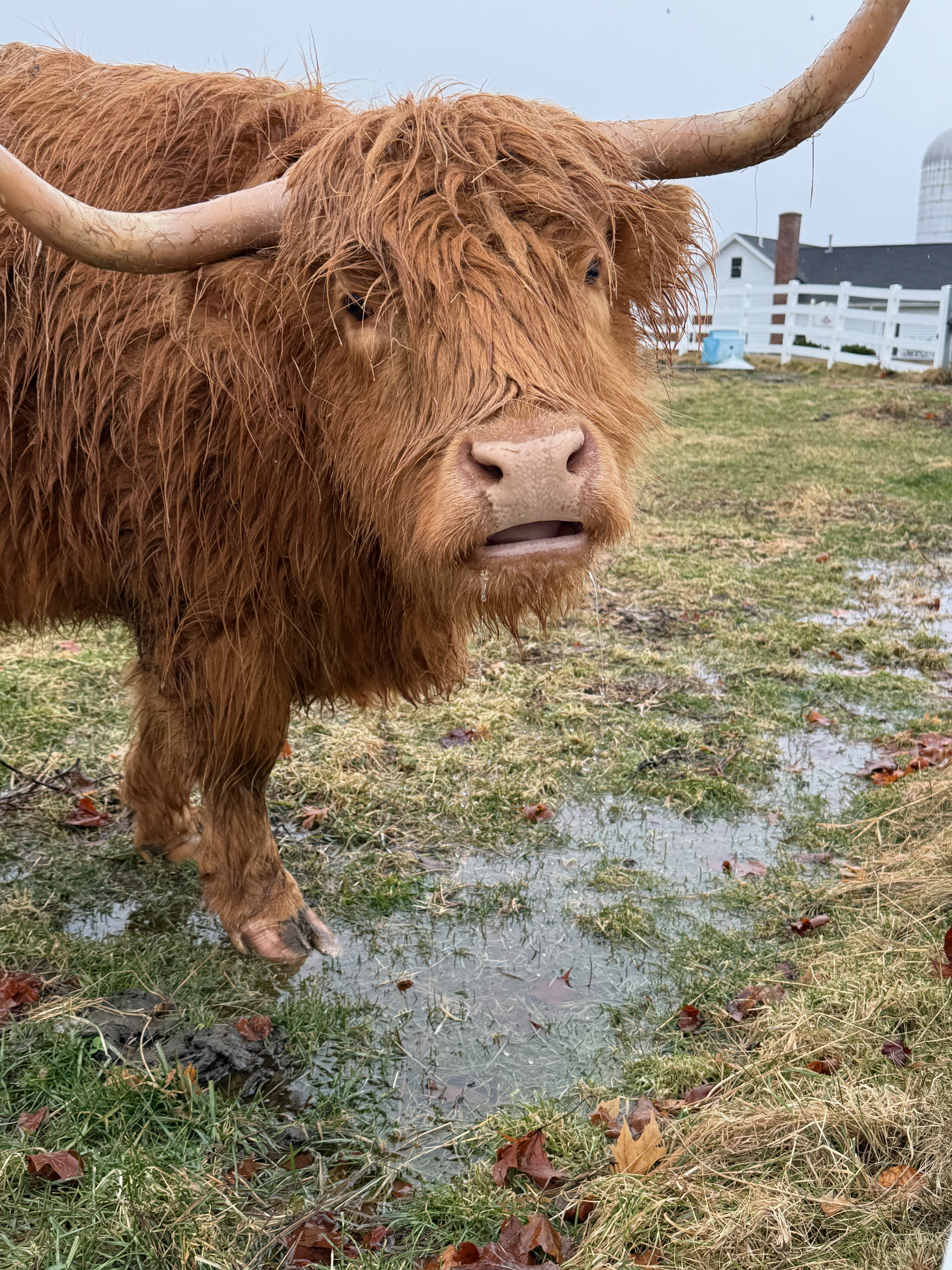
One of the farm's Highland cows in 2024

Wilsondale Farm, in Gray, was the source for Pineland's Trina Holstein breed, whose line was denoted with names beginning with T or R. Pineland used the "Wilsondale" prefix on the product until 2001, when it merged the Wilsondale herd with select prominent herds from around the country. A noted cow was Kissammee Dundee Haley, whose daughter, Pineland Goldwyn Hemi -ET 3E-96, became one of the highest classified Holstein cows ever to be bred in Maine. Each of the cattle with names beginning with the letter H were members of this cow family.

Pineland Farms purchased two Highland cows in 2023.

In 2025, Pineland Farms sold its dairy herd (60 milking cows and 40 heifers), with their last milk production day being March 18, citing unsustainable costs.

Bates College formerly operated a Dutch Warmblood horse breeding at Pineland's Equestrian Center, which opened in 2002. Until 2008, an Equine-assisted therapy program was hosted at the center. Pineland's dressage program ended in 2017 and moved to another facility nearby; a private Morgan horse training and breeding facility replaced it.

The Libra Foundation rents out meeting facilities and guest houses at Pineland Farms. It sells food grown at Pineland Farms to the general public.
