= GYX =

GYX may refer to:

- GYX, code for National Weather Service Gray/Portland, Maine, United States
- GYX, division code for Guiyang County, China
- GYX, Pinyin code for Guiyang West railway station, China
- GYX, Pinyin code for Gaoyi West railway station, China
