= Susan Austin =

American politician

Susan M. Austin

Member of the Maine House of Representatives from the 67th district
- In office December 3, 2014 – December 7, 2022
- Preceded by: Anne Graham
- Succeeded by: Shelley Rudnicki

Member of the Maine House of Representatives from the 109th district
- In office December 2002 – December 2010
- Preceded by: Clifton E. Foster
- Succeeded by: Anne Graham

Personal details
- Party: Republican
- Spouse: Ernest
- Education: Bliss College

Susan M. Austin is an American politician from Maine.

== Education ==
Austin earned an A.A. from Bliss College in Lewiston, Maine.

== Political career ==
A Republican, Austin has represented the town of Gray, in the Maine House of Representatives since 2014. She previously held the same seat from 2002 to 2010. In 2010, she was unable to seek re-election in 2010 due to term-limits. She has also served on the Gray Town Council as well as on the MSAD 15 School Board.

Austin ran again for the District 109 seat in 2012 but lost by 35 votes to incumbent Democrat Anne Graham. She ran once more in 2014 and won the seat, which opened when Anne Graham did not seek re-election.

Austin is a candidate in the 2024 Maine House of Representatives election for District 105.

== Personal life ==
She and her husband have four children.
