= Bliss College =

Business college in Lewiston, Maine, US (1897–1972)

Bliss College (1897–1972) was a private educational institution in Lewiston, Maine. It was founded in 1897 (129 years ago) as Bliss Business College, and was originally located at 160 Lisbon Street.

In September 1962, the campus moved to Webster and Pine Street, using a large house that had been used by the Knights of Columbus. In 1964, the school announced plans to transition into a nonprofit junior college. And in 1969, the college added an associate's degree in science. However, the school closed in 1972 (54 years ago) after filing for bankruptcy. The average enrollment was about 100 students.

== Notable alumni ==
- Susan Austin, state legislator
- Frank Glassman, athlete
- Aminah Robinson, artist
