= Gray, Maine =

Town in Maine, United States

- Town
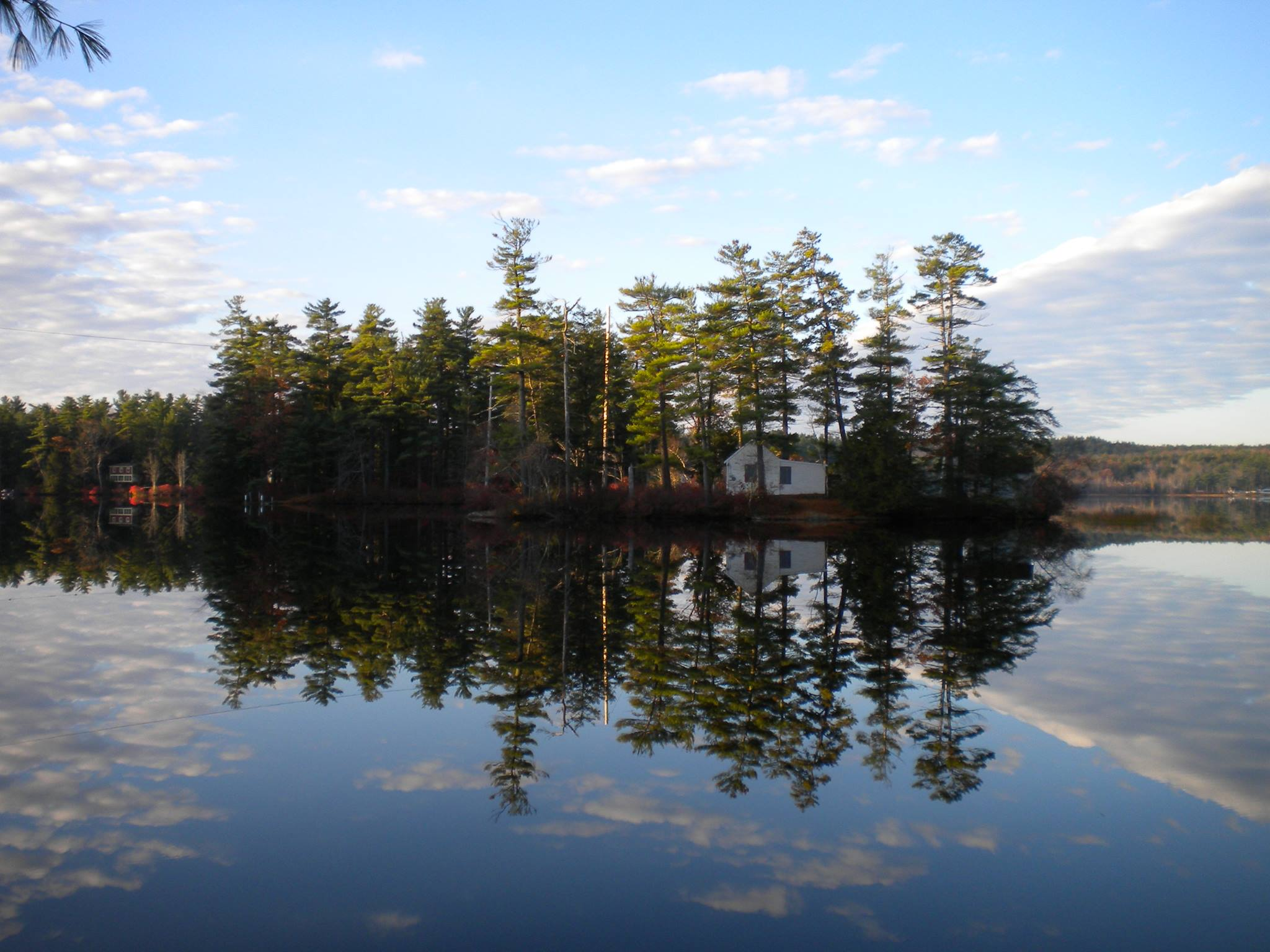
- A clear view of Loon Island on a calm day on Forest Lake

- Seal
- Motto: "At the Heart of It All"
- Location in Cumberland County and the state of Maine.
- Coordinates: 43°52′56″N 70°21′19″W
- Country: United States
- State: Maine
- County: Cumberland
- Incorporated: 1778
- Villages: Gray; Dry Mills; East Gray; North Gray; South Gray; West Gray

Area
  - Total: 45.99 sq mi (119.11 km^{2})
  - Land: 43.27 sq mi (112.07 km^{2})
  - Water: 2.72 sq mi (7.04 km^{2})
- Elevation: 256 ft (78 m)

Population (2020)
  - Total: 8,269
  - Density: 191/sq mi (73.8/km^{2})
- Time zone: UTC-5 (Eastern (EST))
  - Summer (DST): UTC-4 (EDT)
- ZIP Codes: 04039 (Gray); 04071 (Raymond)
- Area code: 207
- FIPS code: 23-28870
- GNIS feature ID: 582497
- Website: www.graymaine.org

Gray is a town in Cumberland County, Maine, United States. The population was 8,269 at the 2020 census. It is part of the Portland-South Portland-Biddeford metropolitan area. and included in the Lewiston-Auburn, Maine metropolitan New England City and Town Area. Gray is located at the intersection of state Routes 4, 26, 100, 115, 202 and the Maine Turnpike exit 63 midway between the state's two largest cities, Portland and Lewiston. The town includes frontage on Little Sebago Lake, Crystal Lake, and Forest Lake.

Gray is home to regional headquarters for the Maine Department of Inland Fisheries and Wildlife (Maine Wildlife Park), which maintains a fish hatchery and wildlife park. It is also home to the Gray/Portland Weather Forecast Office of the NOAA's National Weather Service, which issues forecasts and weather warnings for New Hampshire and western Maine.

== History ==
The area was granted on March 27, 1736, by the Massachusetts General Court to a group from Boston. In 1737, the township was laid out and roads cleared, with the first settlers arriving in the spring of 1738. But during the ongoing French and Indian Wars, the settlement was attacked in the spring of 1745 by Indians, who killed cattle and burned the meetinghouse and all dwellings. Inhabitants fled to other towns. In 1751, the village was resettled, but wiped out again in May 1755.

Consequently, Fort Gray was built in 1755. It featured a blockhouse measuring 50 feet (15 m) long by 25 feet (7.6 m) wide, set within a garrison palisade 100 feet (30 m) long by 75 feet (23 m) wide. The town had been without a name until about 1756, when it began to be called, Boston, then New Boston and eventually, New Town. On June 19, 1778, New Boston Plantation would be incorporated as Gray after Thomas Gray, a proprietor.

Gray had many farms and some quarries. Other industries included a gristmill, 12 sawmills, a tannery, granite and marble works, carriage and sleigh manufacturer, and shuttle maker. Along Collyer Brook, Samuel Mayall established in 1791 the first successful water-powered woolen mill in North America. British woolen guilds had prohibited the production of goods in the colonies and tried to prevent British technology from being put to use in competition against them. Mayall smuggled out of England plans for machinery hidden in bales of cloth meant for trade with the Indians. When the guilds learned of his deception, they tried at least twice to kill him. They sent him a hat in which were hidden pins laced with poison, and then a box with loaded pistols rigged to fire when opened. Suspicious of the packages, Mayall avoided an untimely death. His daughters Mary and Phanela took over the mills when he died in 1831, and built the Lower Mill in 1834. The Mayalls retained ownership until about 1879. The business closed in 1902. The ruins of the mill and associated structures are still visible to this day and are open to the public.

In the 1970s, Gray was chosen as the site of one of ten Decision Information Distribution System radio stations, designed to alert the public of an enemy attack. The system was never implemented and the station was not built.

=== "The Stranger" ===
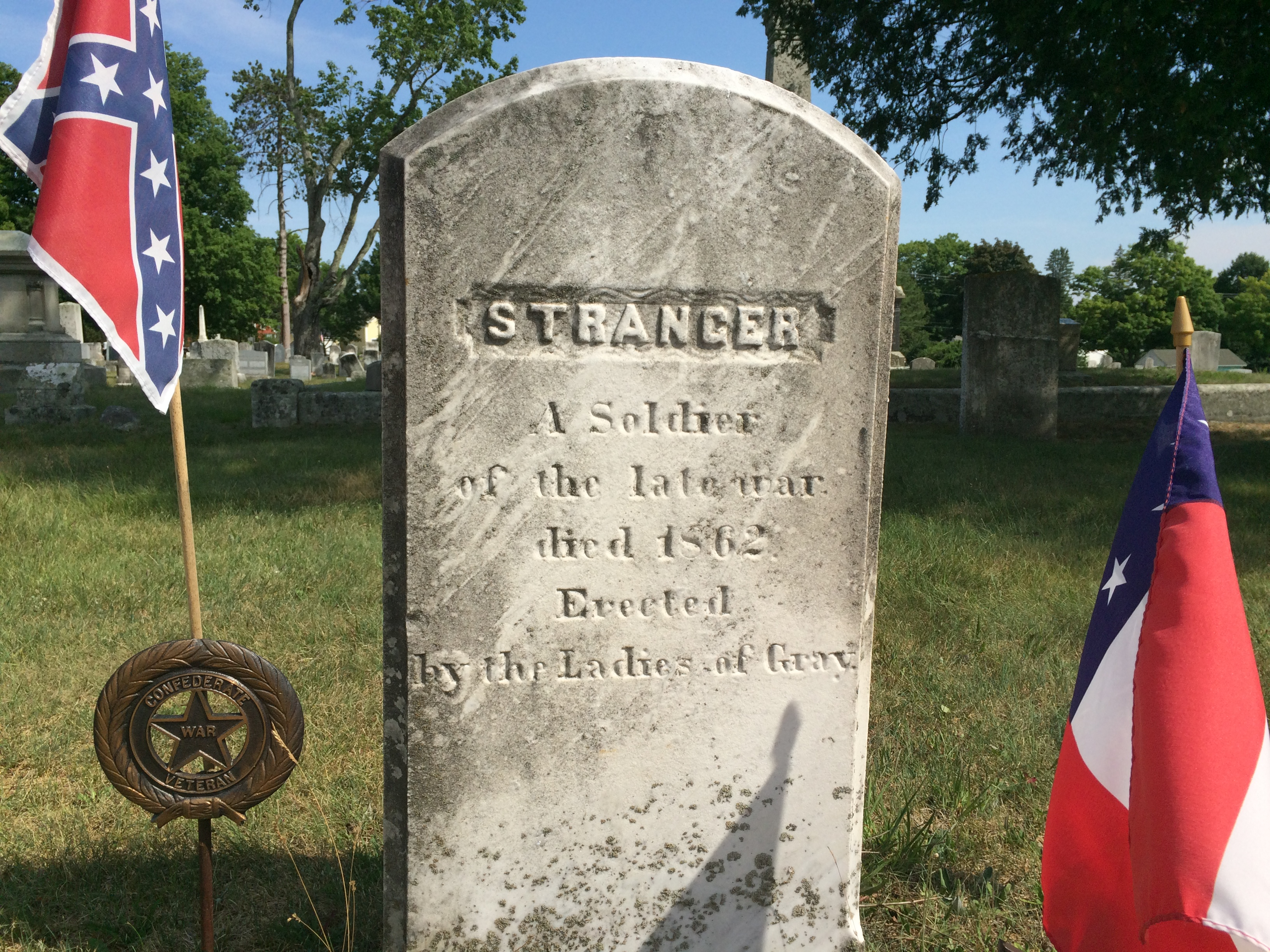
Tombstone of "The Stranger" in Gray, Maine

During the Civil War, a Confederate soldier's body was accidentally sent to Gray. Instead of sending the body away, the "Ladies of Gray" gave the rebel soldier a proper burial and funded a gravestone marked simply, "Stranger". A statue dedicated to the "Unknown Soldier" was later erected in Gray Village Center, and every Memorial Day, the Unknown Soldier is respected with a Confederate flag marking the grave. (The Civil War was especially painful for the small town, as they had proportionately sent more men to conflict than any other town in Maine.) Today, there are more than 178 Union soldiers—and one Confederate—buried in the Gray Village Cemetery.

== Geography ==
According to the United States Census Bureau, the town has a total area of 45.99 square miles (119.11 km^{2}), of which 43.27 square miles (112.07 km^{2}) is land and 2.72 square miles (7.04 km^{2}) is water. Gray, which includes most of Little Sebago Lake and Crystal Lake, is drained by Collyer Brook. Little Sebago Lake has been experiencing problems with milfoil for years.

Gray has five towns surrounding it: Windham to the southwest, Cumberland to the southeast, North Yarmouth to the northeast, New Gloucester to the north-northeast and Raymond to the northwest and west. On a north-up map, Gray is the shape of a crooked square.

Gray has long been interconnected with its neighbor to the north, New Gloucester, both sharing similar demographics, culture and economy. Both towns share the same school district, Maine School Administrative District 15. Being in the vicinity these towns are in, there has been ever-increasing suburban development since the early nineties. Subdivisions and commercial developments have been built at an ever-increasing frequency, leading to the possibility of Gray being swallowed up into the surrounding urban and sub-urban areas in the future. These developments have drawn much protest from residents, many of whom live on the same property as their ancestors many generations ago.

=== Climate ===
Climate data for Gray, Maine, 1991–2020 normals, extremes 1995–present
Month	Jan	Feb	Mar	Apr	May	Jun	Jul	Aug	Sep	Oct	Nov	Dec	Year
Record high °F (°C)	66 (19)	63 (17)	86 (30)	91 (33)	95 (35)	95 (35)	99 (37)	96 (36)	96 (36)	84 (29)	76 (24)	69 (21)	99 (37)
Mean maximum °F (°C)	52.7 (11.5)	50.3 (10.2)	61.6 (16.4)	75.5 (24.2)	87.7 (30.9)	88.3 (31.3)	90.9 (32.7)	89.3 (31.8)	86.6 (30.3)	75.1 (23.9)	65.3 (18.5)	54.5 (12.5)	92.8 (33.8)
Mean daily maximum °F (°C)	29.8 (−1.2)	33.1 (0.6)	41.3 (5.2)	52.9 (11.6)	64.3 (17.9)	73.4 (23.0)	79.0 (26.1)	78.2 (25.7)	70.4 (21.3)	57.7 (14.3)	46.1 (7.8)	35.2 (1.8)	55.1 (12.8)
Daily mean °F (°C)	22.0 (−5.6)	24.7 (−4.1)	32.9 (0.5)	43.5 (6.4)	54.2 (12.3)	63.6 (17.6)	69.5 (20.8)	68.6 (20.3)	60.9 (16.1)	49.2 (9.6)	38.8 (3.8)	28.2 (−2.1)	46.3 (8.0)
Mean daily minimum °F (°C)	14.2 (−9.9)	16.4 (−8.7)	24.6 (−4.1)	34.0 (1.1)	44.0 (6.7)	53.8 (12.1)	60.1 (15.6)	58.9 (14.9)	51.5 (10.8)	40.8 (4.9)	31.4 (−0.3)	21.1 (−6.1)	37.6 (3.1)
Mean minimum °F (°C)	−4.9 (−20.5)	−1.3 (−18.5)	6.3 (−14.3)	24.9 (−3.9)	35.1 (1.7)	44.6 (7.0)	53.9 (12.2)	50.9 (10.5)	39.5 (4.2)	29.5 (−1.4)	16.4 (−8.7)	4.2 (−15.4)	−7.0 (−21.7)
Record low °F (°C)	−15 (−26)	−17 (−27)	−4 (−20)	15 (−9)	31 (−1)	37 (3)	47 (8)	46 (8)	31 (−1)	24 (−4)	3 (−16)	−10 (−23)	−17 (−27)
Average precipitation inches (mm)	3.55 (90)	3.34 (85)	4.01 (102)	4.40 (112)	3.56 (90)	4.73 (120)	3.73 (95)	3.84 (98)	4.32 (110)	5.42 (138)	4.65 (118)	4.59 (117)	50.14 (1,275)
Average snowfall inches (cm)	20.6 (52)	20.4 (52)	16.2 (41)	4.7 (12)	0.0 (0.0)	0.0 (0.0)	0.0 (0.0)	0.0 (0.0)	0.0 (0.0)	0.6 (1.5)	3.8 (9.7)	17.7 (45)	84.0 (213)
Average precipitation days (≥ 0.01 in)	10.9	10.1	11.4	11.7	13.6	13.1	12.3	11.1	9.8	11.8	11.3	12.7	139.8
Average snowy days (≥ 0.1 in)	8.7	7.9	6.3	2.2	0.0	0.0	0.0	0.0	0.0	0.2	2.3	7.4	35.0
Source 1: NOAA
Source 2: National Weather Service (mean maxima/minima 2006–2020)

== Demographics ==
Historical population
Census	Pop.	Note	%±
1790	577		—
1800	987		71.1%
1810	1,310		32.7%
1820	1,479		12.9%
1830	1,575		6.5%
1840	1,740		10.5%
1850	1,788		2.8%
1860	1,767		−1.2%
1870	1,738		−1.6%
1880	1,798		3.5%
1890	1,517		−15.6%
1900	1,388		−8.5%
1910	1,270		−8.5%
1920	1,139		−10.3%
1930	1,189		4.4%
1940	1,378		15.9%
1950	1,631		18.4%
1960	2,184		33.9%
1970	2,939		34.6%
1980	4,344		47.8%
1990	5,904		35.9%
2000	6,820		15.5%
2010	7,761		13.8%
2020	8,269		6.5%

=== 2010 census ===
As of the census of 2010, there were 7,761 people, 3,156 households, and 2,187 families residing in the town. The population density was 179.4 inhabitants per square mile (69.3/km^{2}). There were 3,841 housing units at an average density of 88.8 per square mile (34.3/km^{2}). The racial makeup of the town was 97.2% White, 0.7% African American, 0.2% Native American, 0.5% Asian, 0.1% Pacific Islander, 0.1% from other races, and 1.2% from two or more races. Hispanic or Latino of any race were 0.9% of the population.

There were 3,156 households, of which 30.5% had children under the age of 18 living with them, 56.0% were married couples living together, 9.3% had a female householder with no husband present, 4.0% had a male householder with no wife present, and 30.7% were non-families. 20.9% of all households were made up of individuals, and 6.5% had someone living alone who was 65 years of age or older. The average household size was 2.46 and the average family size was 2.85.

The median age in the town was 40.6 years. 21.3% of residents were under the age of 18; 7.5% were between the ages of 18 and 24; 28.2% were from 25 to 44; 32.2% were from 45 to 64; and 10.8% were 65 years of age or older. The gender makeup of the town was 49.7% male and 50.3% female.

=== 2000 census ===
As of the census of 2000, there were 6,820 people, 2,637 households, and 1,890 families residing in the town. The population density was 157.7 inhabitants per square mile (60.9/km^{2}). There were 3,202 housing units at an average density of 74.0 per square mile (28.6/km^{2}). The racial makeup of the town was 97.89% White, 0.43% African American, 0.15% Native American, 0.38% Asian, 0.07% Pacific Islander, 0.22% from other races, and 0.87% from two or more races. Hispanic or Latino of any race were 0.59% of the population.

There were 2,637 households, out of which 33.5% had children under the age of 18 living with them, 60.9% were married couples living together, 8.0% had a female householder with no husband present, and 28.3% were non-families. 19.7% of all households were made up of individuals, and 7.1% had someone living alone who was 65 years of age or older. The average household size was 2.57 and the average family size was 2.98.

In the town, the population was spread out, with 24.6% under the age of 18, 6.3% from 18 to 24, 34.6% from 25 to 44, 24.6% from 45 to 64, and 9.9% who were 65 years of age or older. The median age was 37 years. For every 100 females, there were 103.2 males. For every 100 females age 18 and over, there were 99.6 males.

The median income for a household in the town was $50,107, and the median income for a family was $55,806. Males had a median income of $36,342 versus $26,433 for females. The per capita income for the town was $22,050. About 1.3% of families and 2.6% of the population were below the poverty line, including 2.3% of those under age 18 and none of those age 65 or over.

== Education ==
- Maine School Administrative District 15
- Gray-New Gloucester High School

== Photo gallery ==
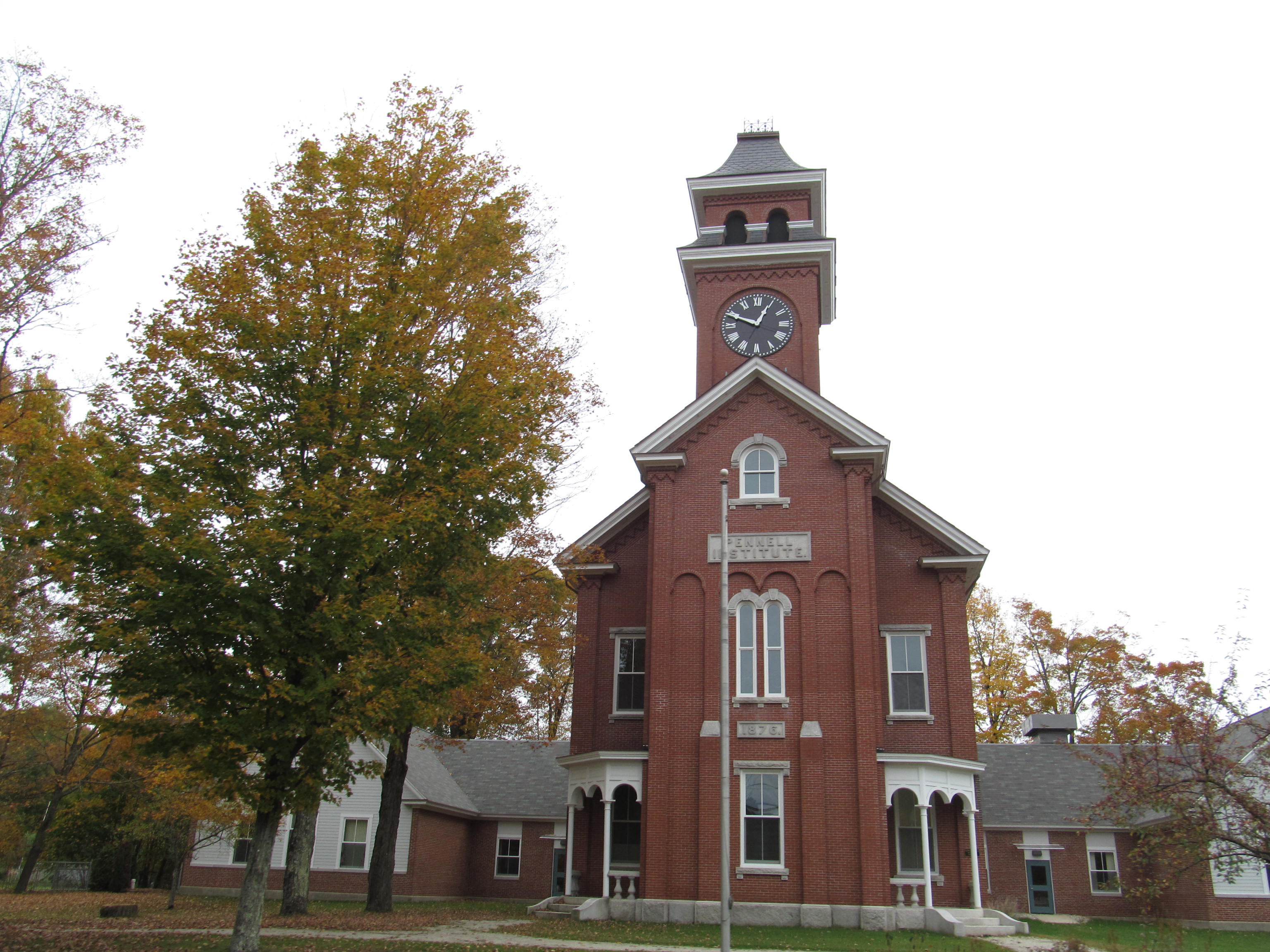
Henry Pennell Municipal Complex

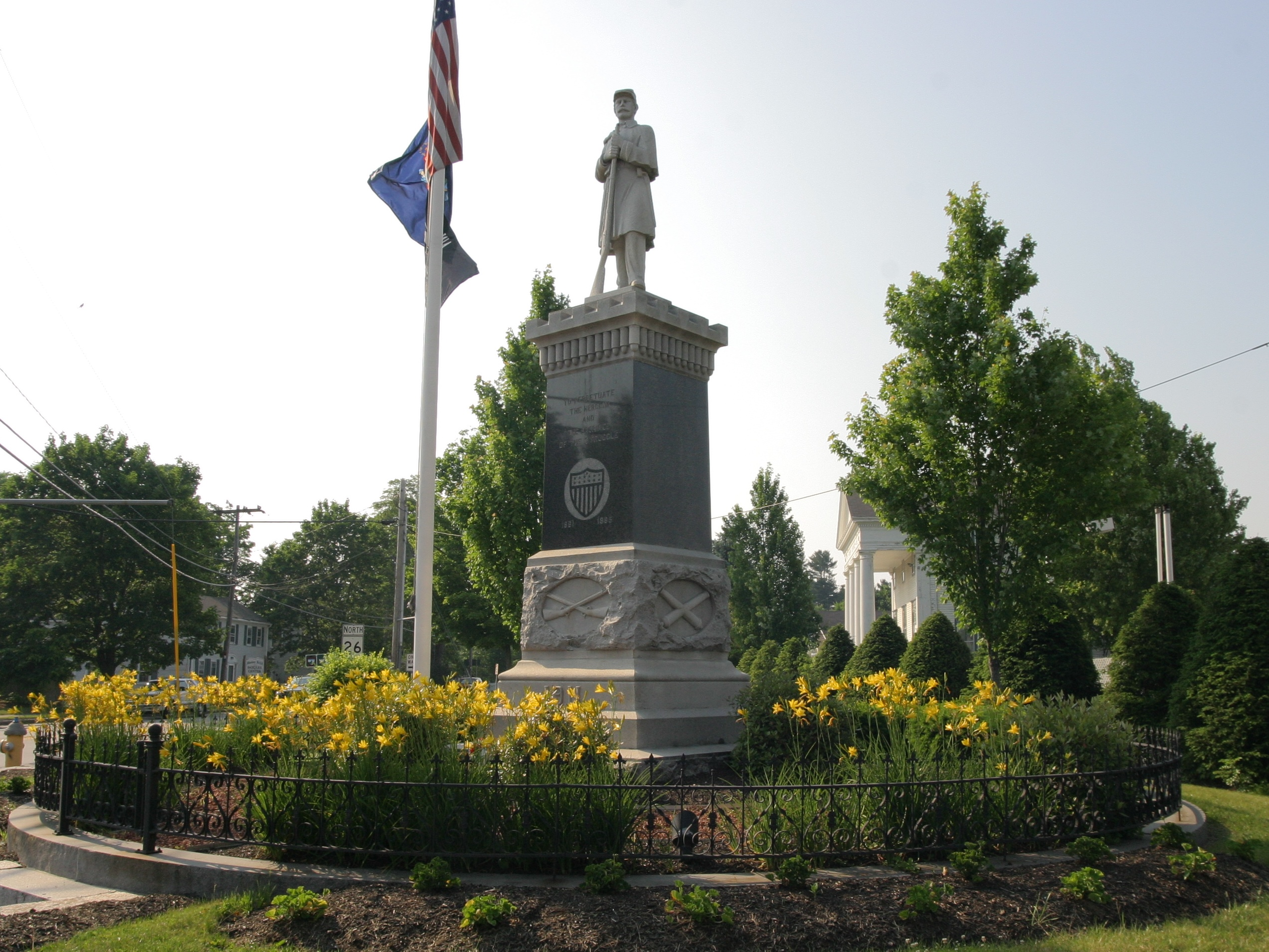
Centrally located Monument Square in the heart of Gray Village.

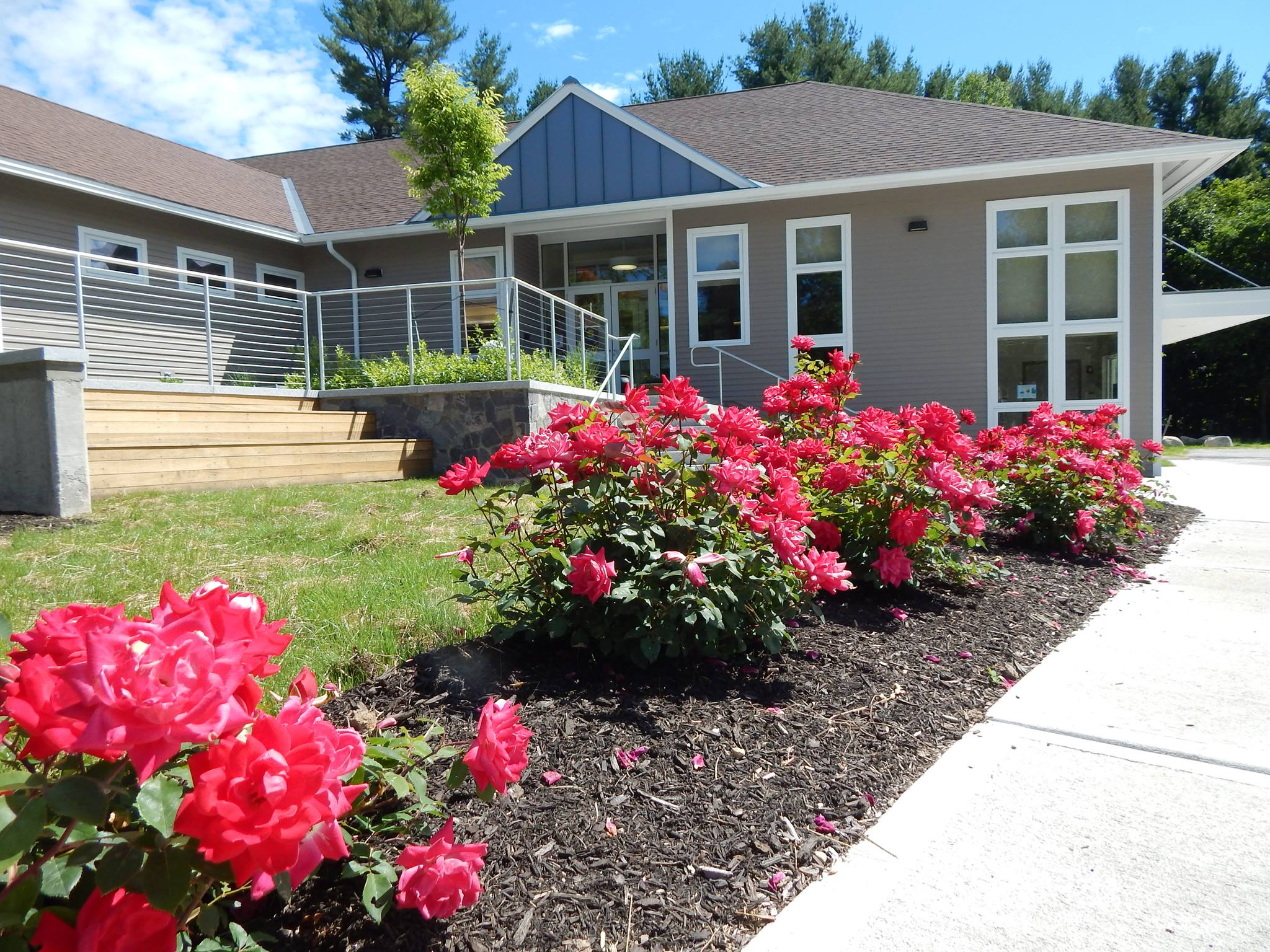
Newly renovated Gray Public Library provides a media hub with books, movies, music, and more.

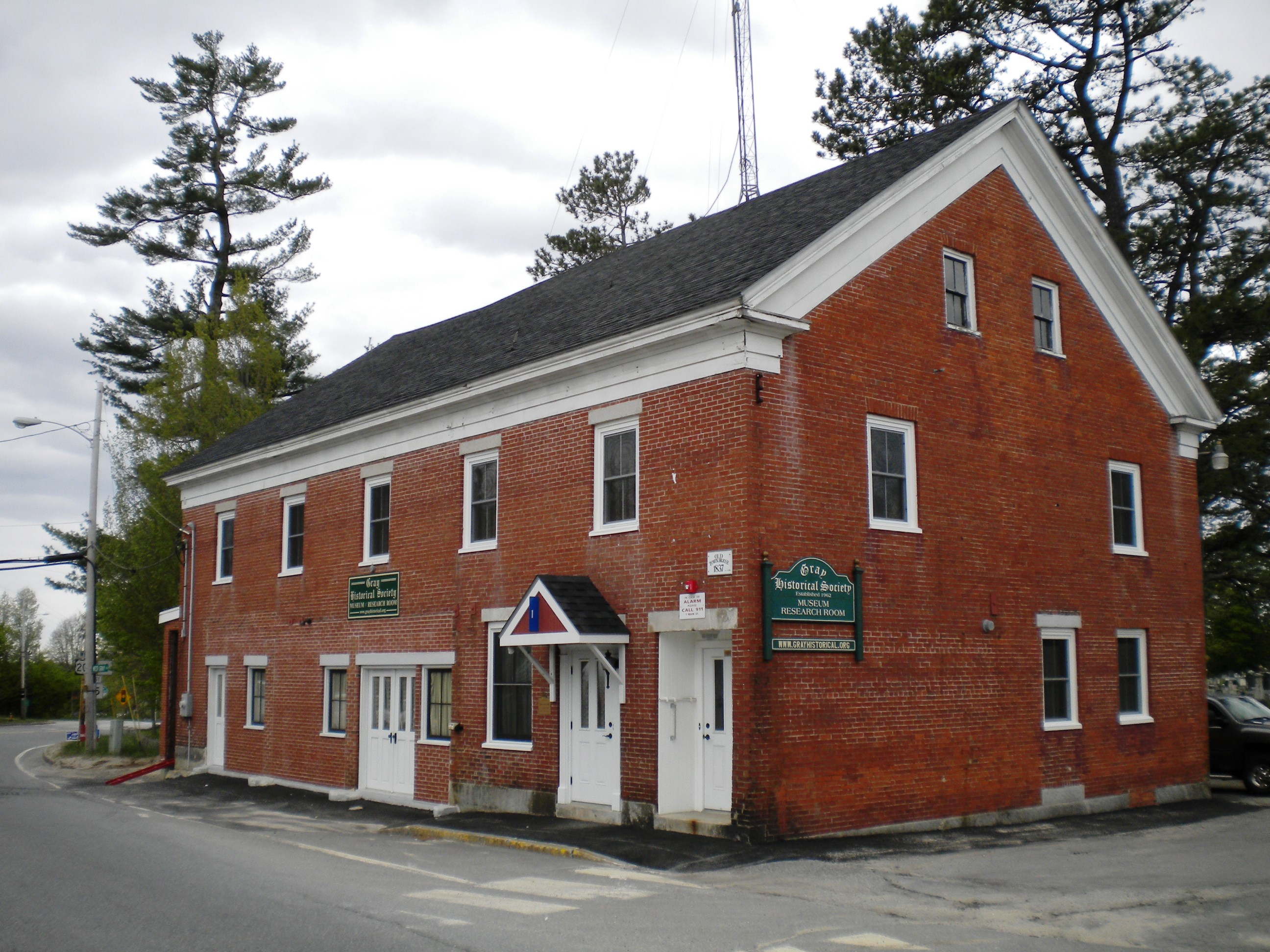
Town of Gray Maine Historical Society & Museum

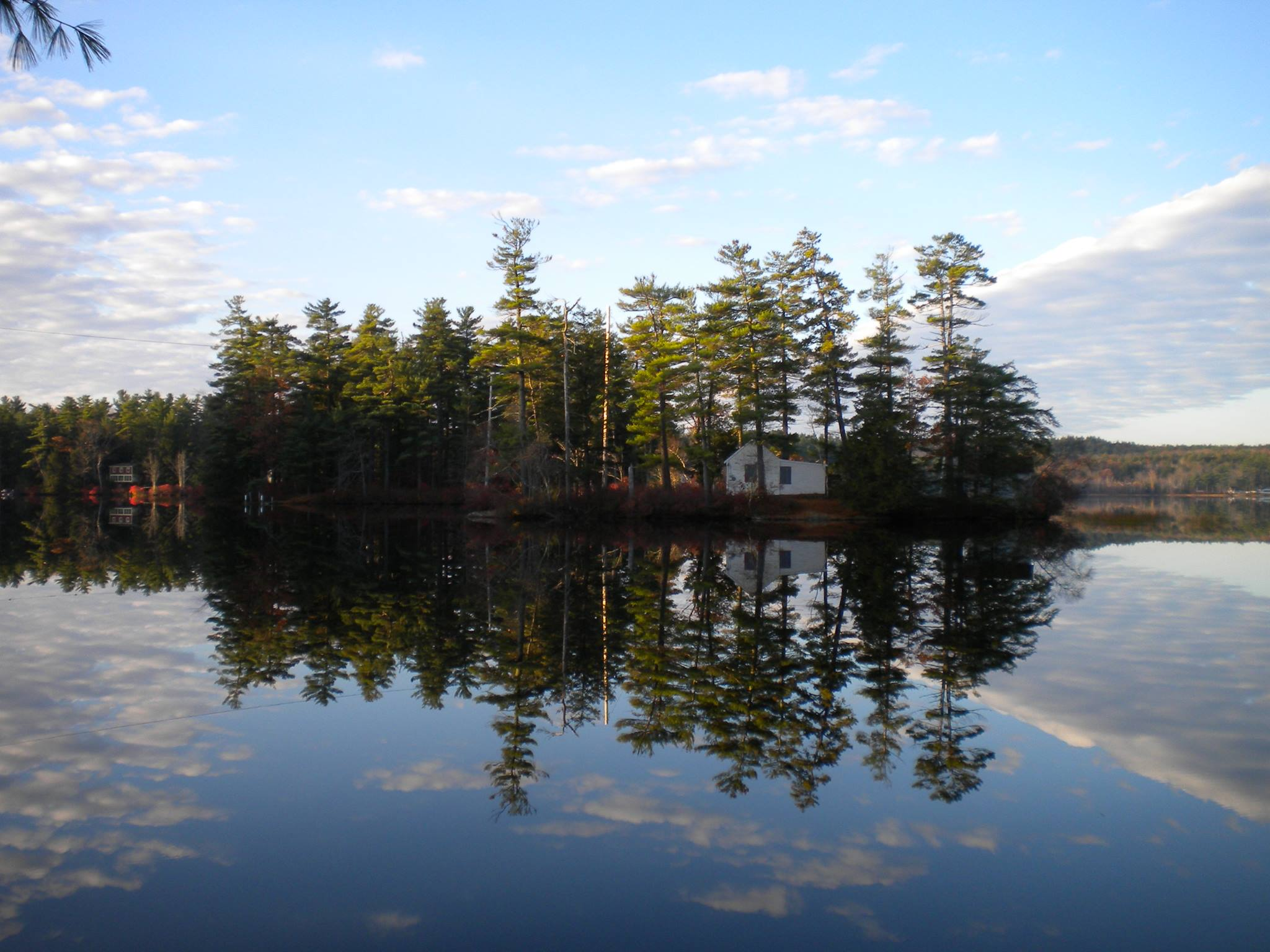
A clear view of tiny Loon Island on a perfectly calm day on Forest Lake in Gray

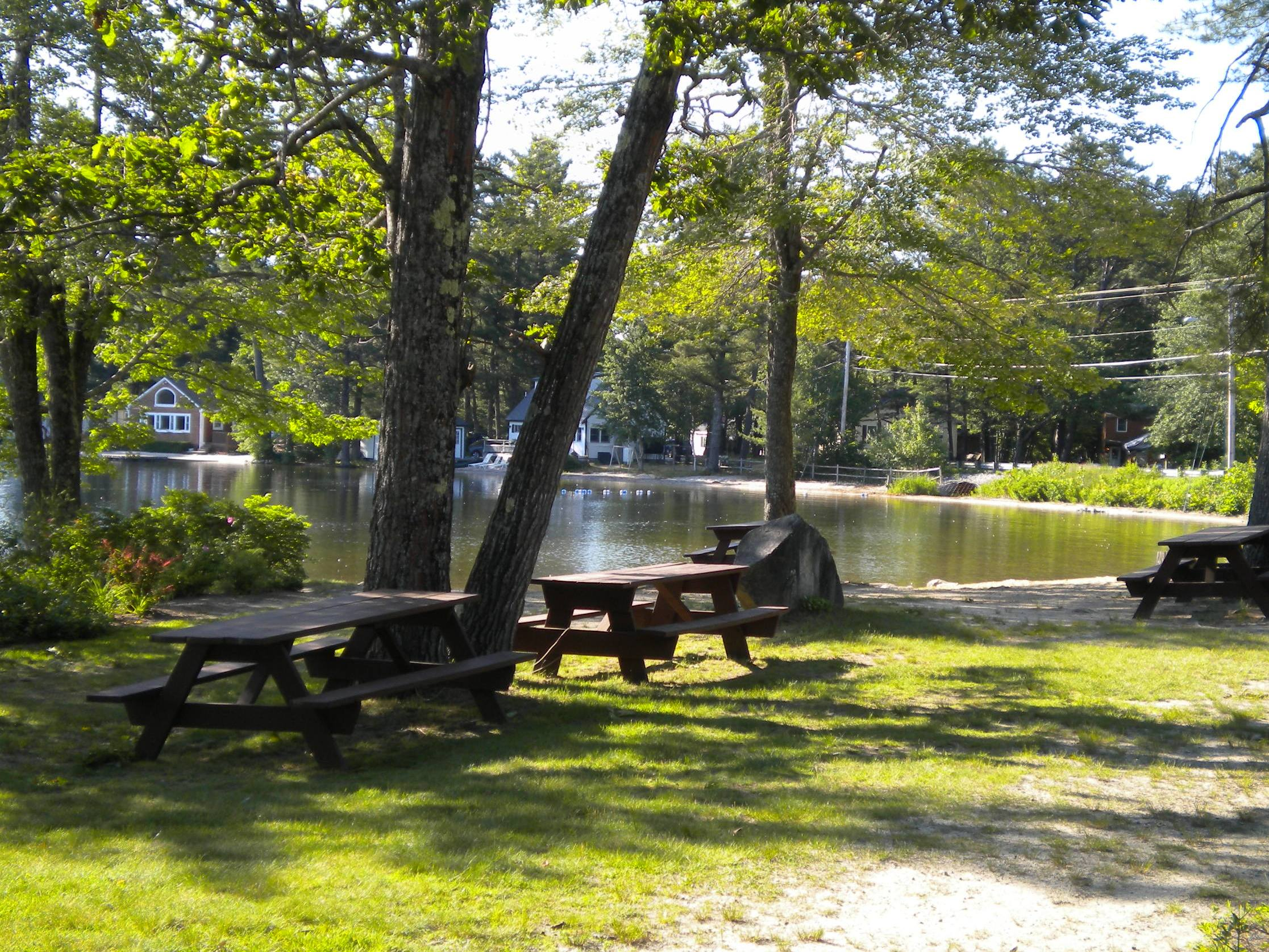
Wilkies Beach Gray Maine

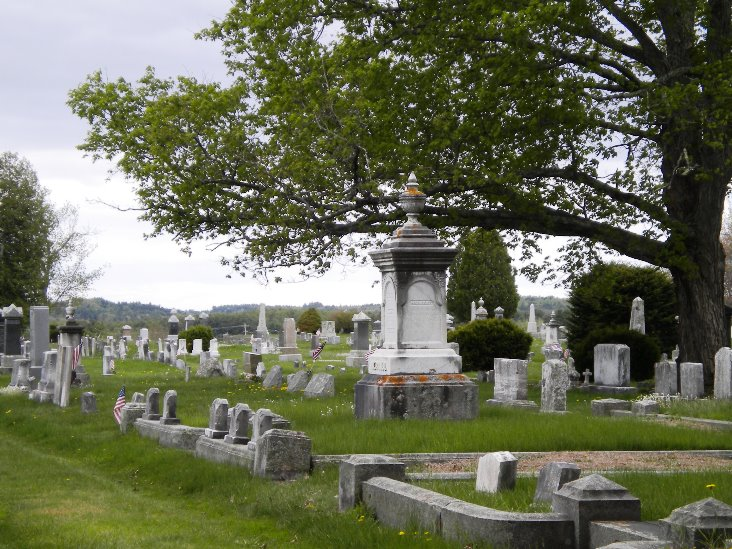
Gray Village Cemetery: Final resting place of approximately 5,500 Gray residents.

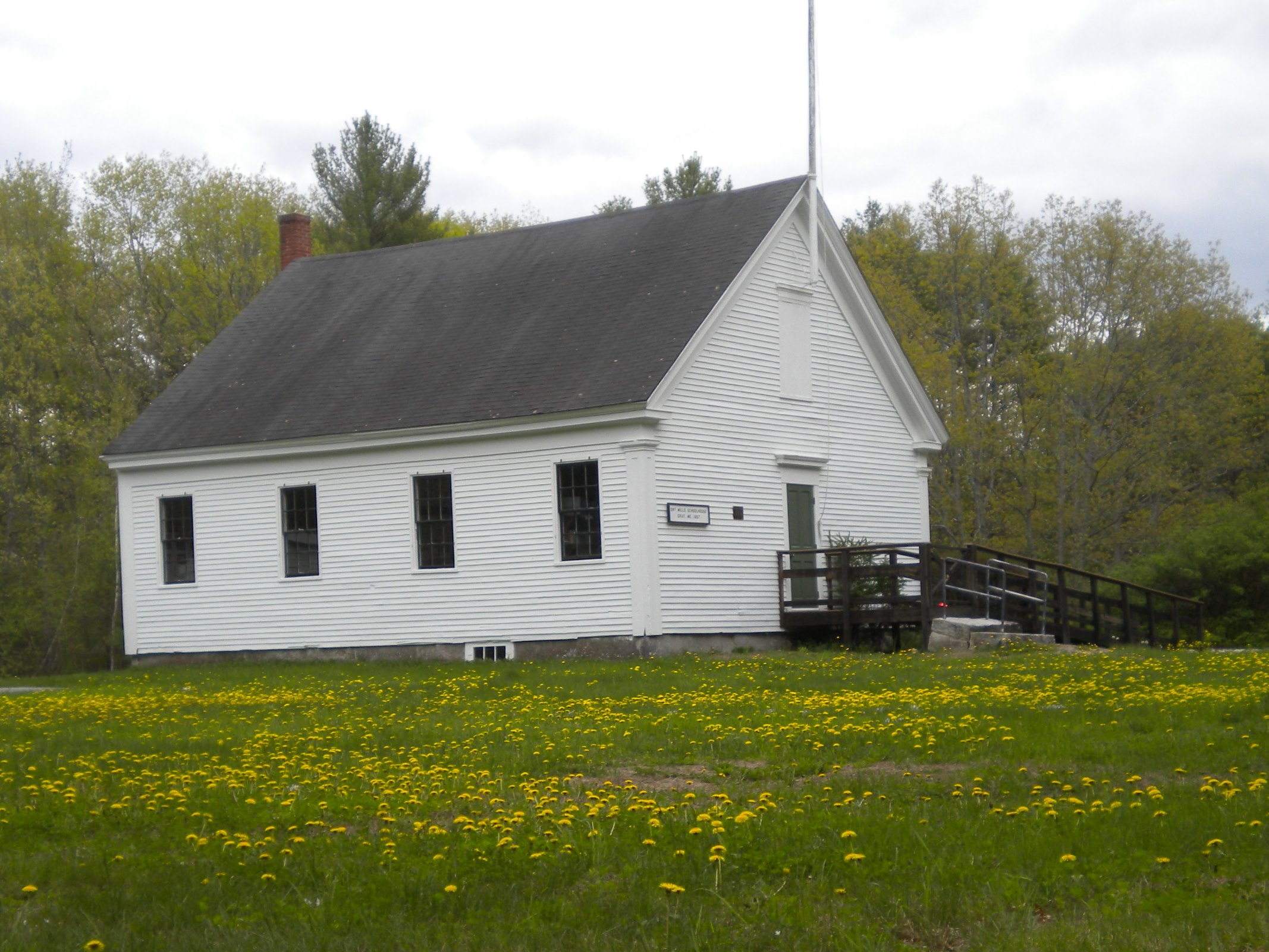
A view of Dry Mills one-room schoolhouse with a meadow filled with spring flowers.

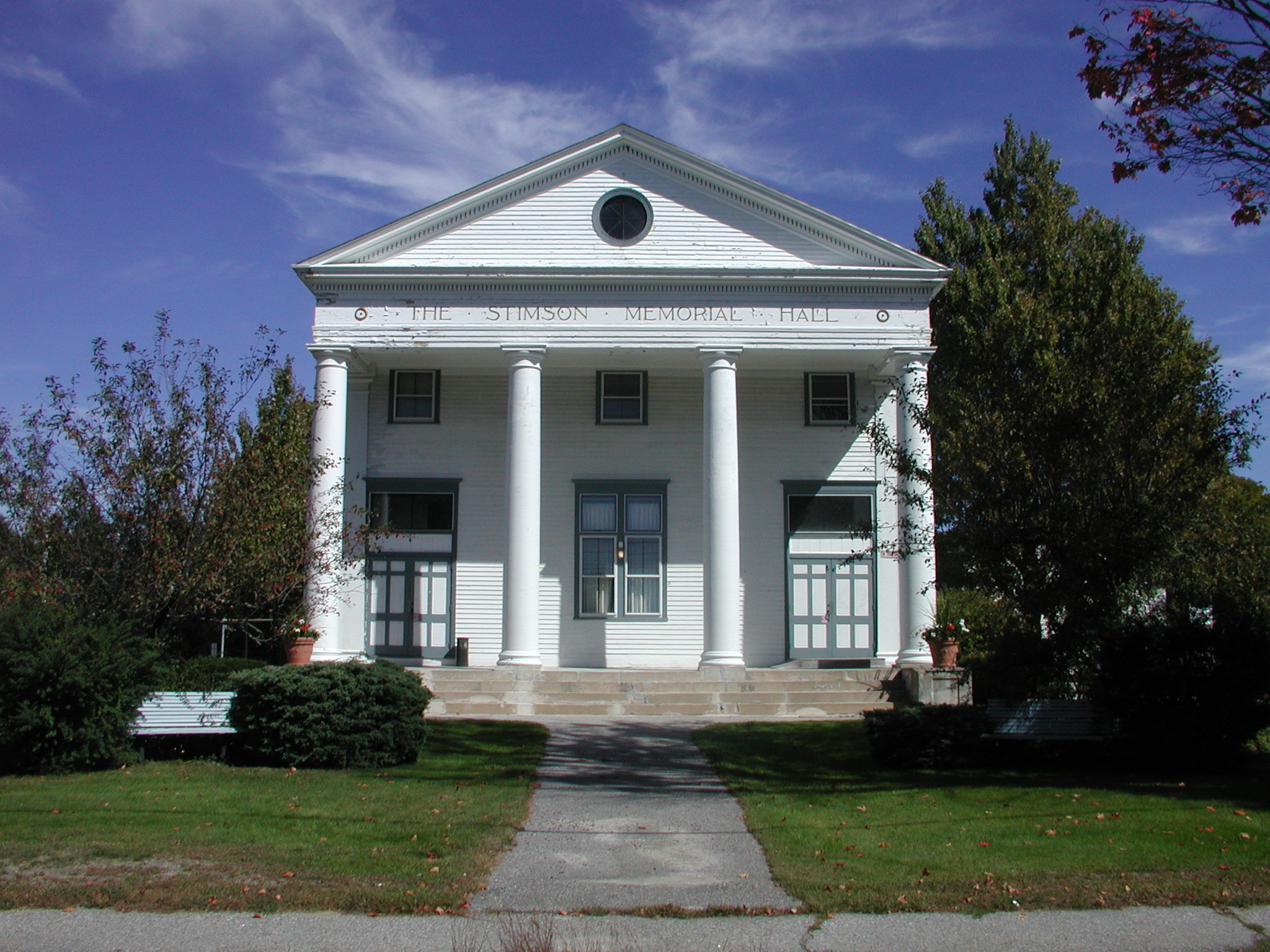
Stimson Memorial Hall

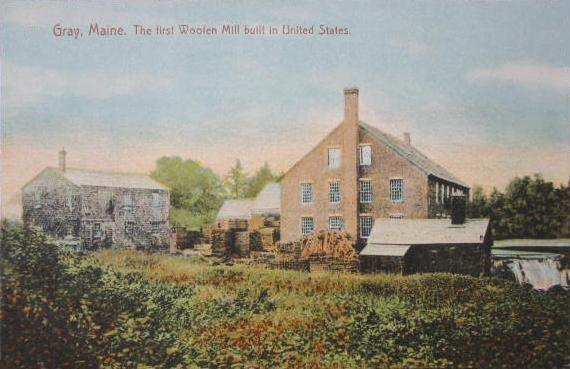
Mayall Mill c. 1908

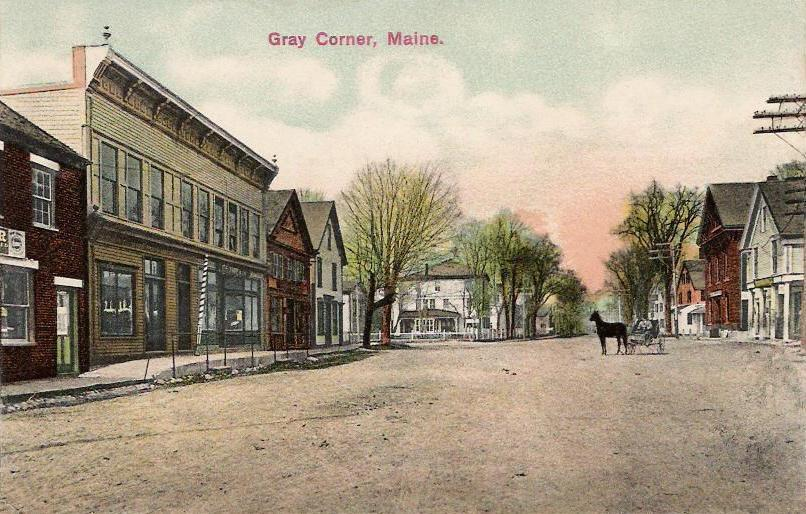
Gray Corner in 1908

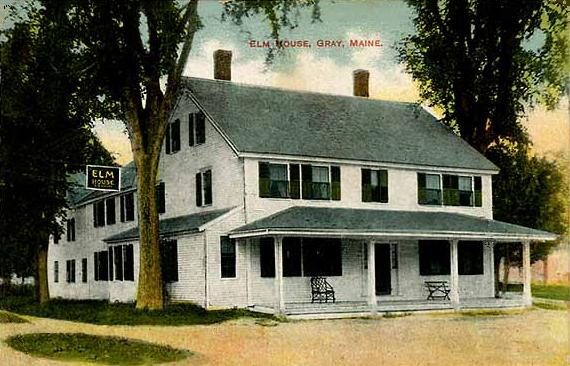
The Elm House c. 1910

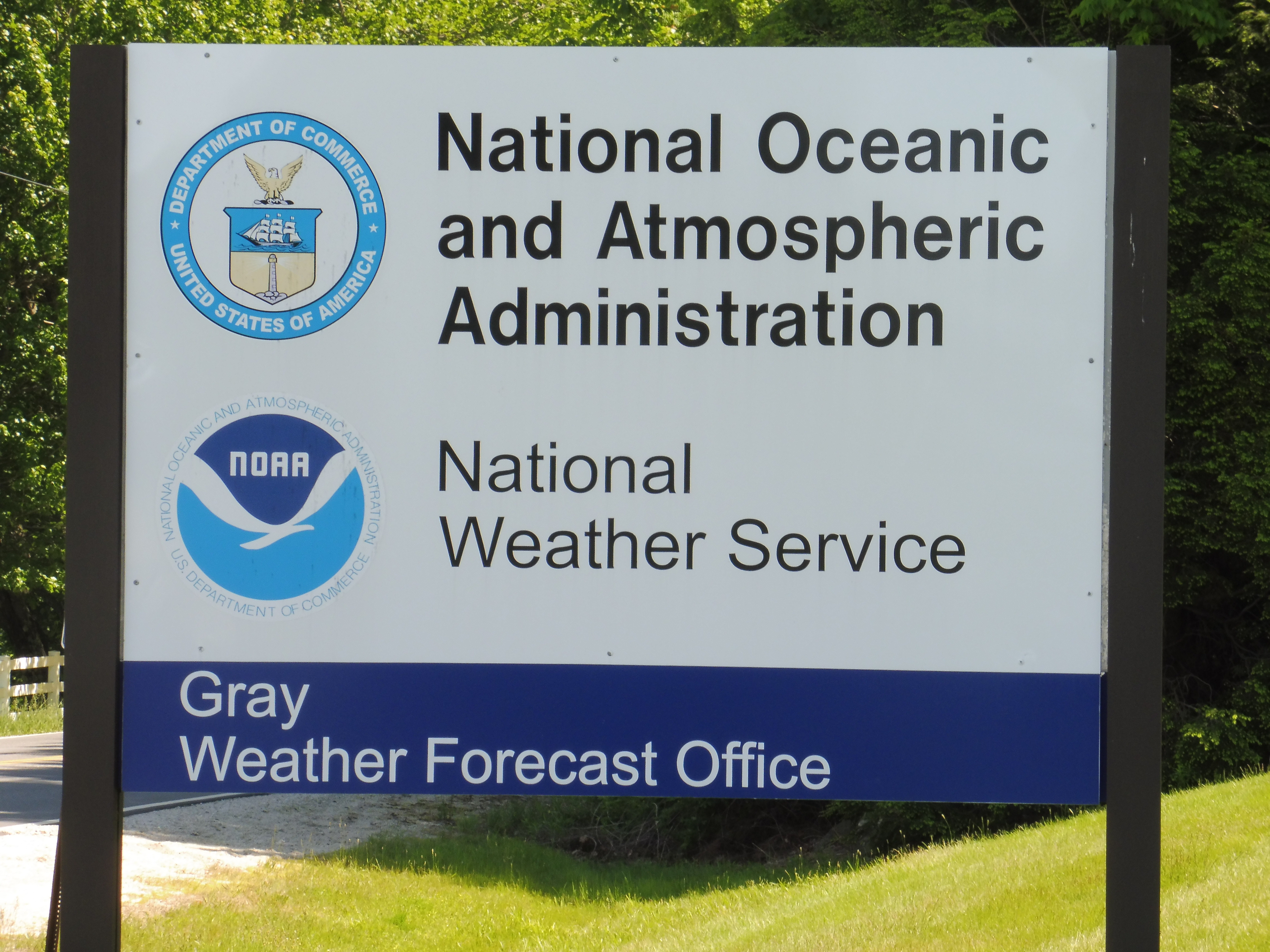
National Weather Service Office in Gray

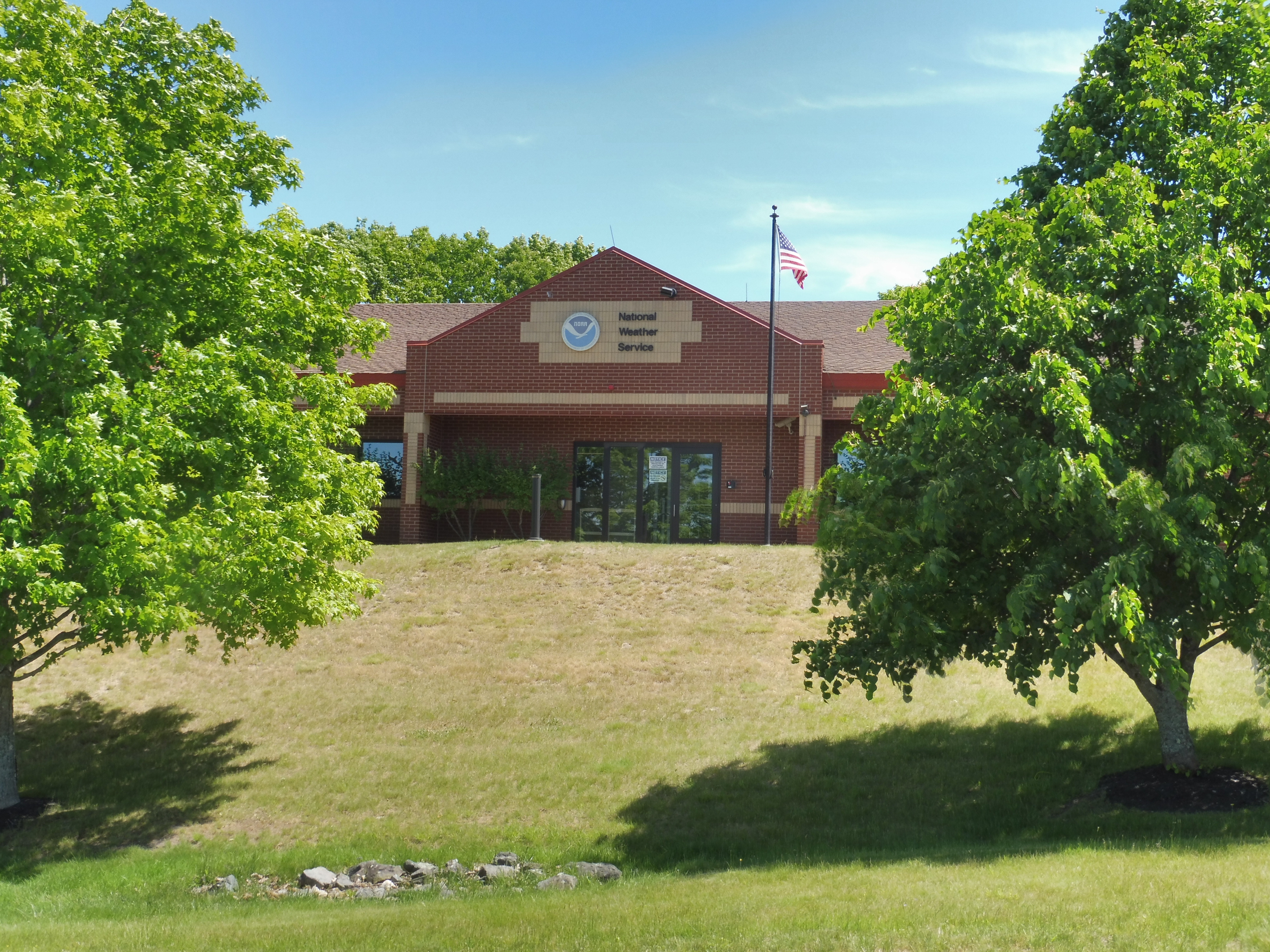
National Weather Service Office in Gray

== Notable people ==
- Wendell Abraham Anderson, politician
- Susan Austin, politician
- Cuke Barrows, professional baseball outfielder
- Walter B. Gibson, author and magician
- Simon Greenleaf, jurist
- Samuel Mayall, U.S. congressman
- Reuben Ruby, entrepreneur and abolitionist
- Warren H. Vinton, state legislator

== Sites of interest ==
- Town of Gray official website
- Gray Historical Society
- Gray Public Library
- Mayall Mills State Historic Site
