= Frank Glassman =

American football player (1908–1996)

- Glassman c. 1933

Profile
- Positions: Guard, tackle

Personal information
- Born: May 14, 1908; Columbus, Ohio, U.S.
- Died: February 1, 1976 (aged 67); Columbus, Ohio, U.S.
- Listed height: 6 ft 0 in (1.83 m)
- Listed weight: 210 lb (95 kg)

Career information
- High school: Central (OH)
- College: Wilmington, Bliss

Career history
- Buffalo Bisons (1929)

Career NFL statistics
- Games played: 9

Frank Glassman (May 14, 1908 – August 1, 1996) was an American football and basketball player. He played college football for Wilmington and Bliss College of Columbus, Ohio. He also played college basketball for Bliss College and the University of Detroit. In 1929, he played professional football in the National Football League (NFL) as a guard and tackle for the Buffalo Bisons. He appeared in nine NFL games, five as a starter.

Glassman's brother, Morris Glassman, was born in Russia in 1900 and played in the NFL for the Columbus Panhandles from 1921 to 1922.
