= Maine School Administrative District 15 =

School district in Cumberland County, Maine, United States

Coordinates: 43°51′N 70°19′W

Location
- Cumberland County, Maine; United States

District information
- Type: Public
- Grades: K–12
- Superintendent: Craig King

Students and staff
- Students: Approx. 1,800
- Teachers: 160.5 (on FTE basis)

Other information
- Student:teacher ratio: 12.4:1
- Website: www.msad15.org

Maine School Administrative District 15 is a public school district that operates three elementary schools (K–2 and 3–4), one middle school (5–8) and one high school (9–12) in Cumberland County in the U.S. state of Maine. The school system serves the towns of Gray, Maine and New Gloucester, Maine. The school system is run by a school board and superintendent system. The school system was established in 1960, and the high school opened in 1962.

== Schools ==
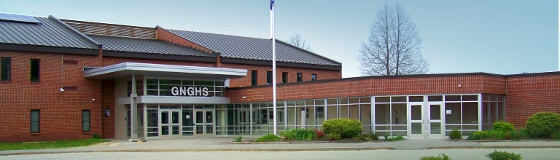
GNGHS, late spring 2012

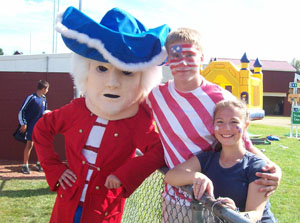
The school's mascot is the Patriot, although is dressed like a redcoat.

Table of the schools in MSAD #15
School	Town Located	Grades	Principal	Assistant Principal	Athletic Director
Memorial Elementary School	New Gloucester, Maine	K – 2	Amanda Hennessey	N/A	N/A
James W. Russell Elementary School	Gray, Maine	K – 2	Daniel Blake	N/A	N/A
Burchard A. Dunn Elementary School	New Gloucester, Maine	Pre-K, 3/4	Geoffrey Robbins	N/A	N/A
Gray-New Gloucester Middle School	Gray, Maine	5 – 8	Richard Riley-Benoit	Kristin Dacko	Susan Robbins
Gray-New Gloucester High School	Gray, Maine	9 – 12	Sadie Grealish	Michael Andreasen (Interim) Jade Costello (2022-2023)	Susan Robbins

== See also ==
- New Gloucester, Maine
- Gray, Maine
