= Guiyang West railway station =

Railway station in Guizhou, China

Guiyang West railway station 贵阳西站
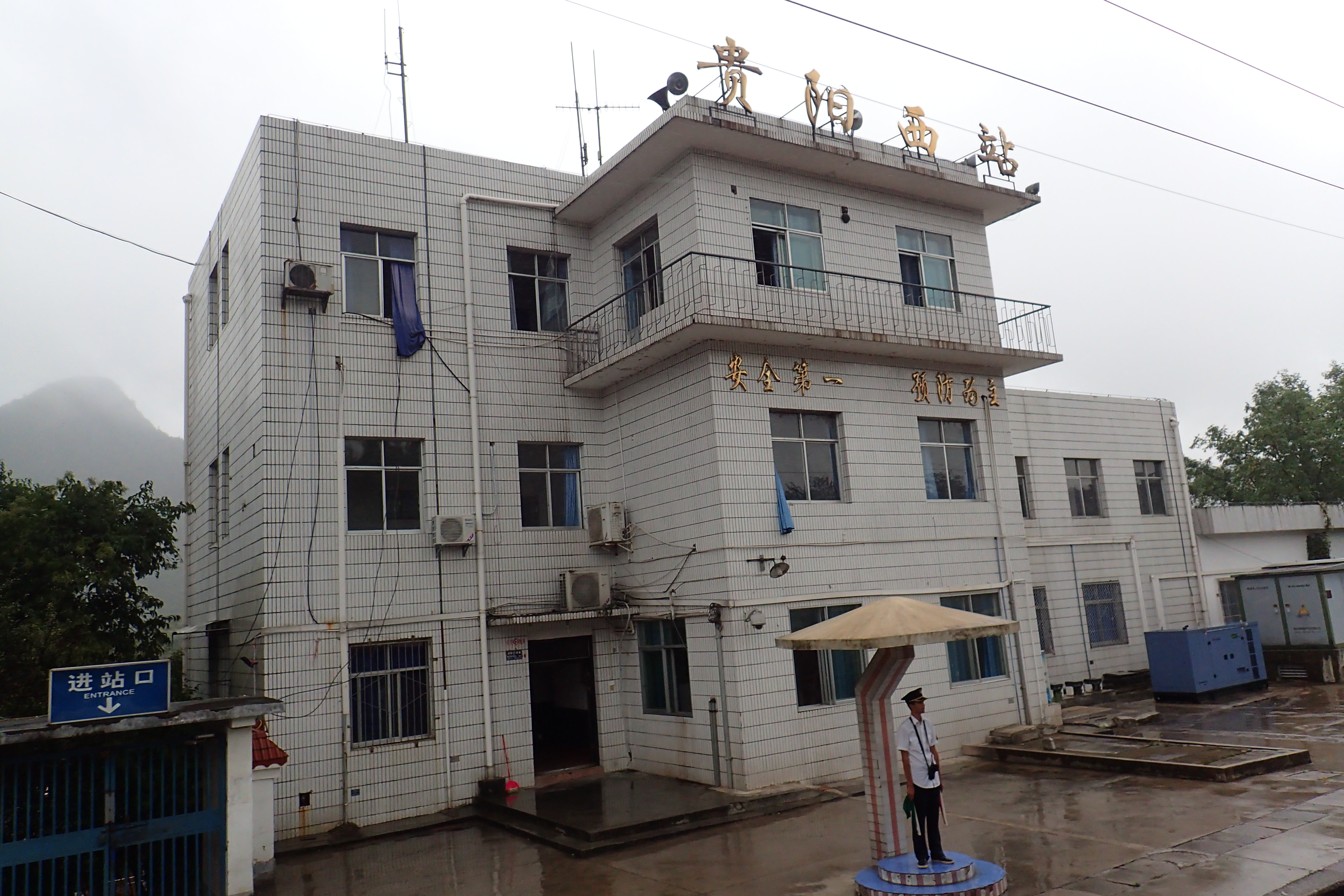
- The station building in 2017

General information
- Location: Dashuigou, Huaxi District, Guiyang, Guizhou; China
- Coordinates: 26.491628°N 106.669512°E
- Operated by: CR Chengdu
- Line: Shanghai–Kunming railway

Other information
- Station code: GQW (Telegraph); GYX (Pinyin); 49631 (Station)

History
- Opened: 1959
Location

Guiyang West station (Chinese: 贵阳西站), also known as Guiyangxi station, is a railway station in Huaxi District, Guiyang, Guizhou, China, operated by CR Chengdu. It opened its services in 1959.

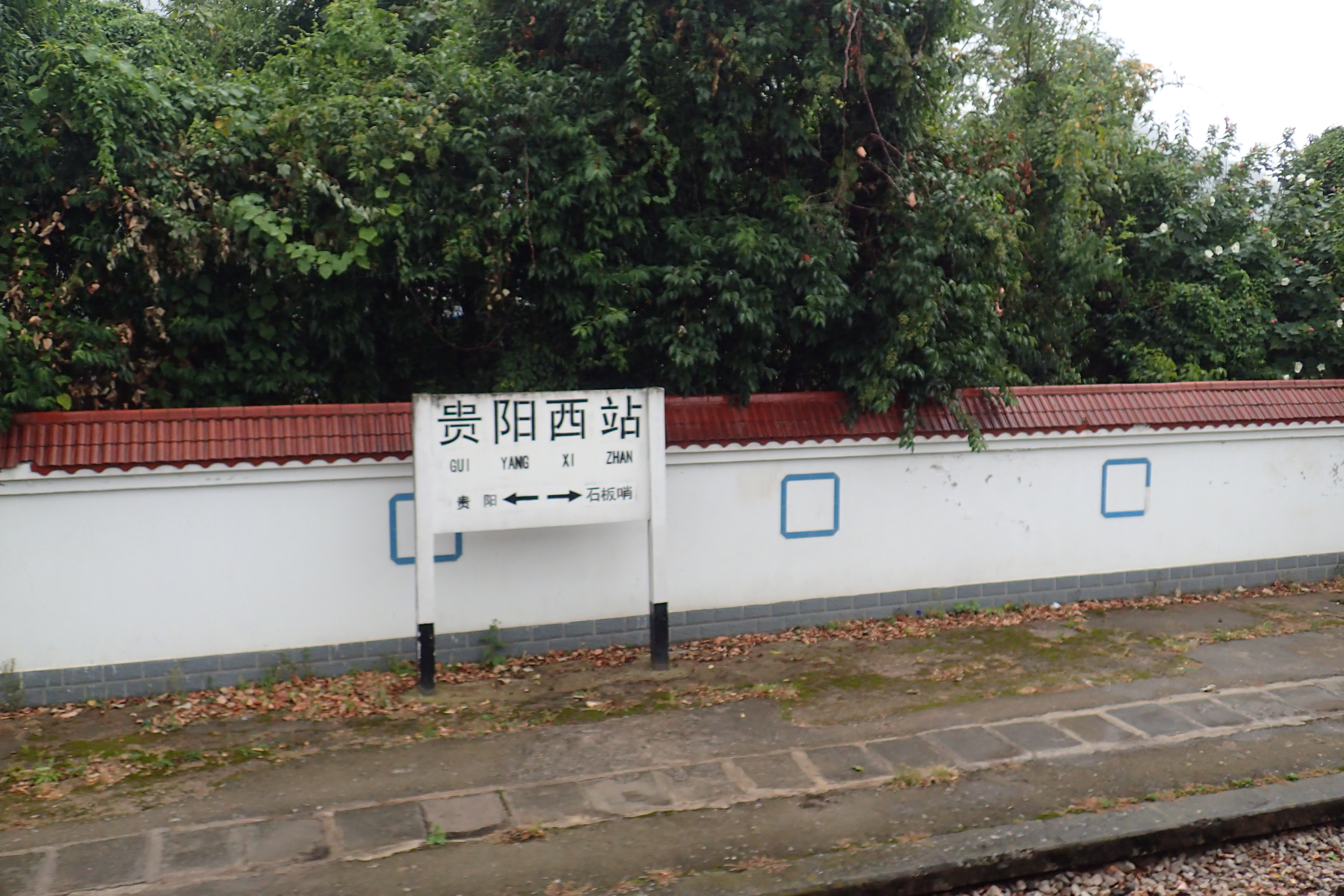
The station sign of Guiyang West railway station

The station handles freight services on the Shanghai–Kunming railway line. It is 10 kilometres (6.2 mi) away from Guiyang railway station. It mainly transports steel, chemicals, coal, and mining goods.
