= National Weather Service Gray/Portland, Maine =

Local office of the National Weather Service

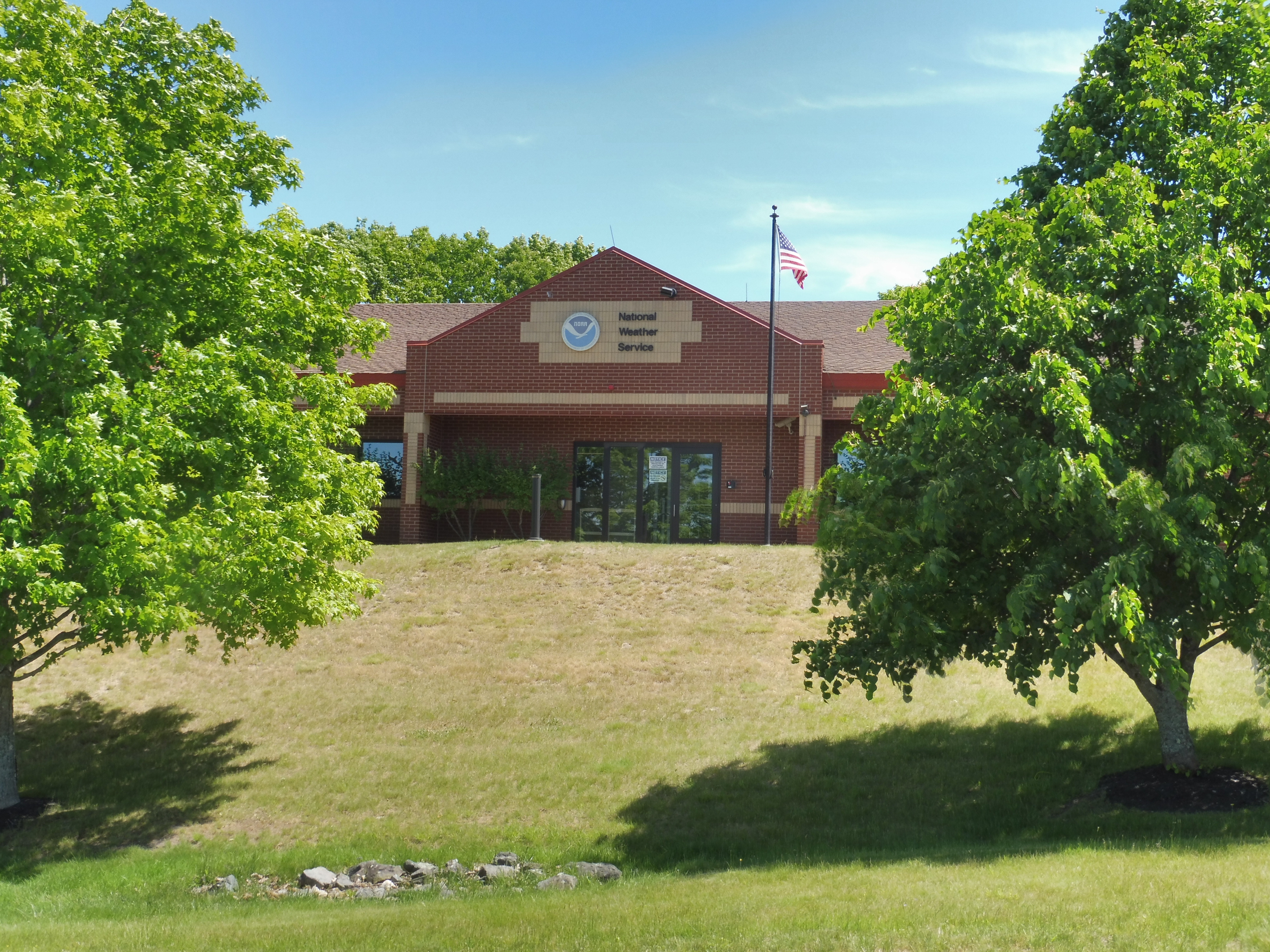
- Types: branch
- Location: Gray
- Country: United States
- Coordinates: 43°53′34″N 70°15′16″W
- Parent organisations: National Weather Service
- Website: www.weather.gov/gyx/

The National Weather Service Gray/Portland, Maine (GYX) is a local office of the National Weather Service responsible for monitoring weather conditions over western Maine and all of New Hampshire. It is situated in Gray, Maine, in the metropolitan area of Portland, in a rural setting.

== Mission ==
Coverage of NWS Weather Forecast Offices where Gray/Portland is GYX.

The National Weather Service in Gray provides weather, hydrologic, and climate forecasts and warnings for western Maine, New Hampshire, and adjacent waters for the protection of life and property and the enhancement of the national economy.

== Observation network ==
The National Weather Service in Gray is responsible for observing equipment at Portland, Augusta, Wiscasset, and Fryeburg in Maine; and Concord, Manchester, Rochester, Lebanon, Berlin, Jaffrey, and Whitefield in New Hampshire. The FAA or other organizations maintain the equipment in Lewiston-Auburn, Rockland, Waterville, Sanford, and Rangeley in Maine; and Laconia, Keene, Nashua, and Plymouth in New Hampshire.

The site in Gray has a WSR-88D weather radar, part of the NEXRAD network, which Reflectivity/Doppler/dual polarization high resolution data cover an area of about 143 miles (230 km) around the station, or roughly the area of responsibility of the NWS Forecasting Office in Gray (long range reflectivity data cover about double of this).

Colocated is a radiosonde facility from which a weather balloon is released twice daily to obtain temperature, humidity and winds in the troposphere above Maine. It is part of a network of such facilities across United States, run by the NWS, which in turn is part of the World Weather Watch.

== Photos ==
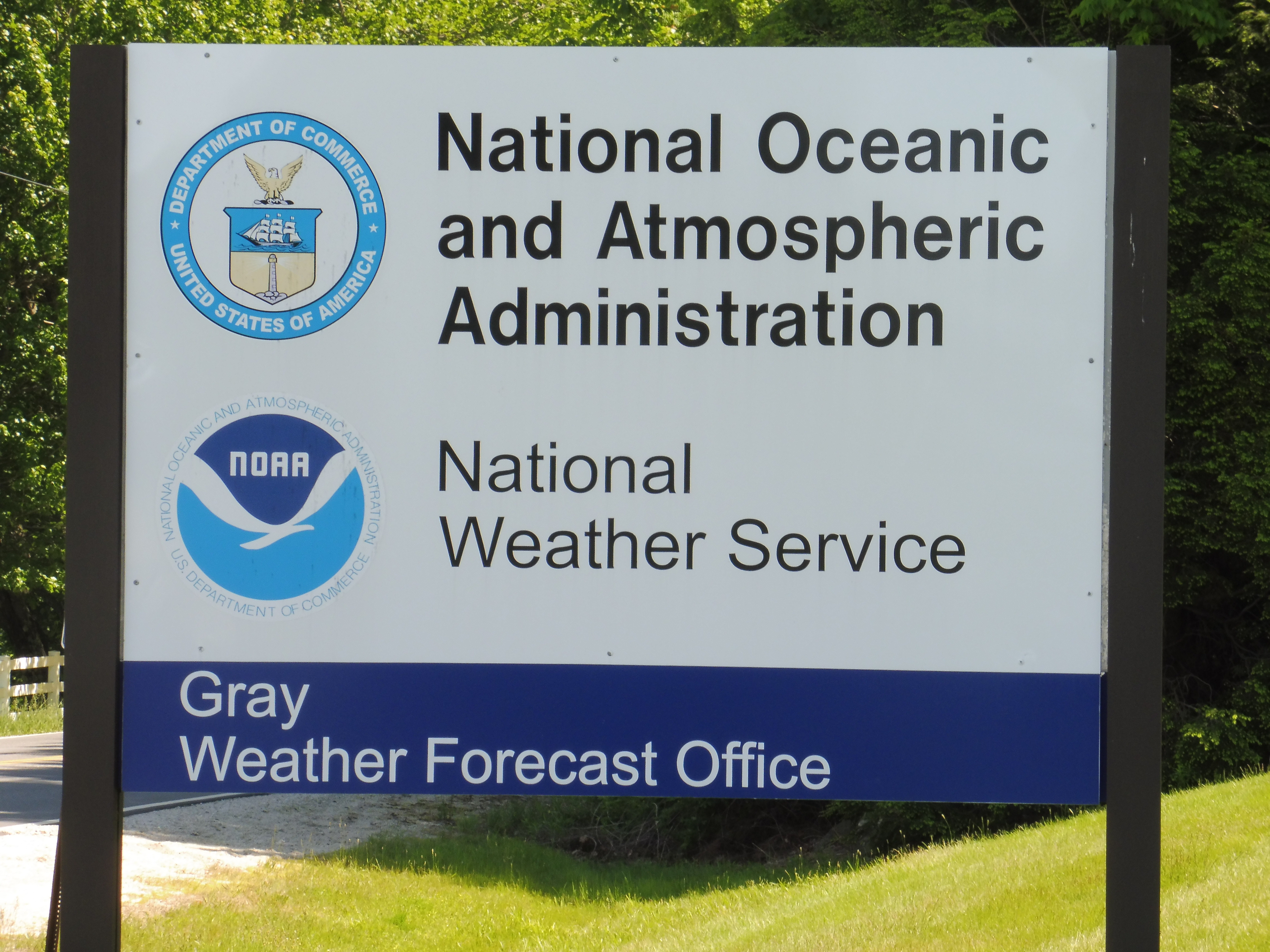
National Weather Service Office in Gray

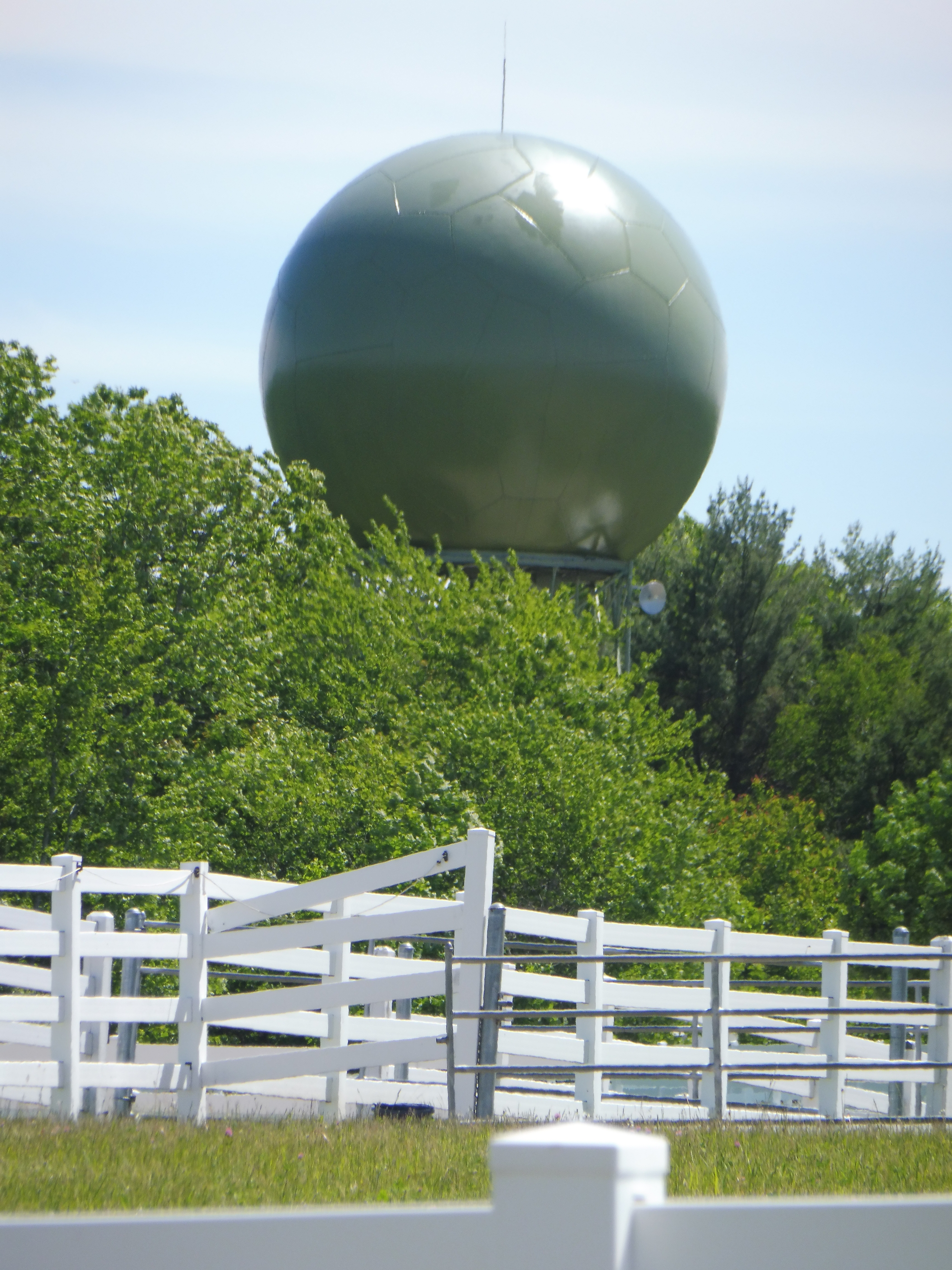
NEXRAD radome near the office

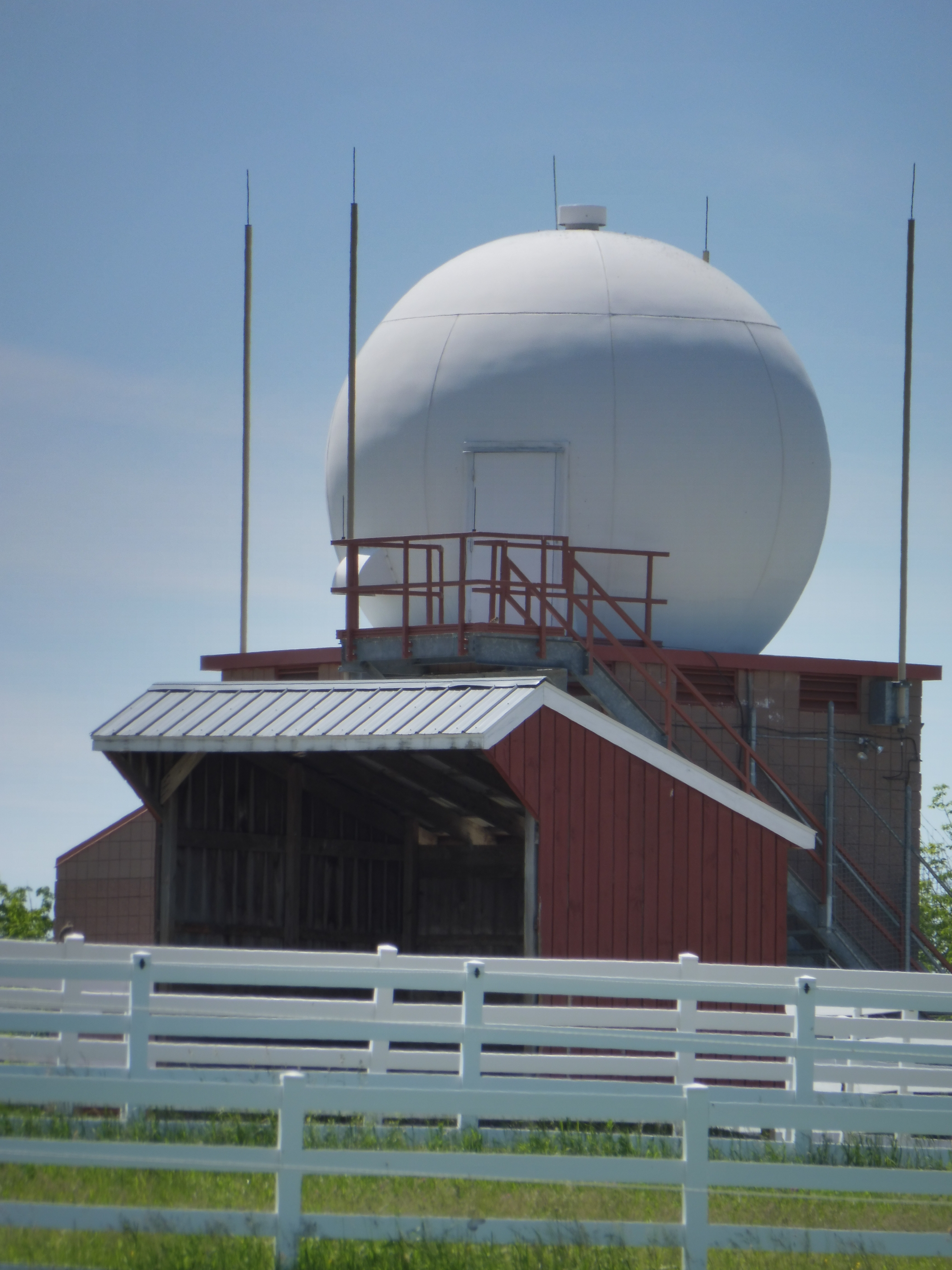
Radiosounding shed near the office
