= Lower Lisbon Street Historic District =

Historic district in Maine, United States

- U.S. National Register of Historic Places
- U.S. Historic district
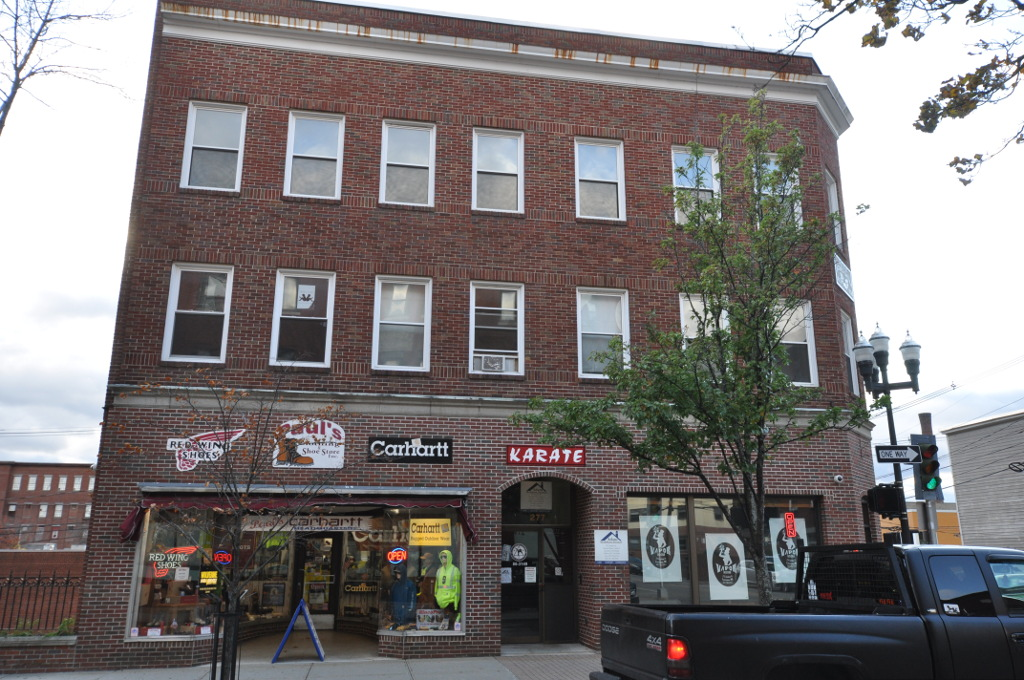

- Location within Maine Location within the United States
- Location: West side of Lisbon St. between Cedar and Chestnut, Lewiston, Maine
- Coordinates: 44°5′36″N 70°12′58″W
- Area: 2.5 acres (1.0 ha)
- Architectural style: Classical Revival, Late Victorian
- NRHP reference No.: 85001128
- Added to NRHP: May 21, 1985

The Lower Lisbon Street Historic District encompasses part of the earliest commercial center of Lewiston, Maine. Located on the west side of Lisbon Street, the city's main commercial area, between Cedar and Chestnut Streets are a collection of commercial buildings representing a cross section of architectural styles, built between 1850 and 1950. When the historic district was listed on the National Register of Historic Places in 1985, it included 18 buildings. Eleven of these have since been demolished, and one has a significantly altered facade.

== Description and history ==
The city of Lewiston was established in 1850 as a center for the manufacture of textiles, and its downtown area developed along Lisbon Street between then and about 1920, when the textile mills began a slow decline. The upper portion of Lisbon Street, between Main and Chestnut Streets, experienced intensive repeated development, and little of the city's early commercial architecture survives there. The lower part of the street was less intensively developed, resulting in a collection of buildings architecturally representative of the entire period of development. The historic district extends for one city block, including all of the buildings on the west side of Lisbon Street between Chestnut and Cedar Streets. The older buildings on the east side of this block have for the most part been razed and the land redeveloped, with only the First and Second Callahan Buildings (both separately listed on the National Register) at the northern end; they are not included in this district.

When listed on the National Register in 1985, the west side of this block was lined with commercial buildings, most of them built of brick and masonry. Of the eighteen buildings then on the block, twelve were judged historically significant, and only seven are still standing. One of the surviving buildings is the district's oldest, a 2 1/2-story wood frame gable-front building built c. 1850–55. It is flanked by later four-story buildings, one Romanesque and the other Classical Revival, dating to 1914 and 1896 respectively. To the south stand two more buildings, one four stories and the other one, with commercial Italianate style, but a significantly-altered combined ground-floor storefront. Two three-story brick buildings still stand near the northern end of the block, one of which, the Centennial Block, has Gothic Victorian styling.

== See also ==
- National Register of Historic Places listings in Androscoggin County, Maine
