= Gray-New Gloucester High School =

Coordinates: 43.9031°N 70.3495°W

Location
- 10 Libby Hill Rd; Gray, Maine 04039; United States

Information
- Motto: Bursting with Patriot Pride!
- Established: 1962
- School district: MSAD 15: Gray-New Gloucester
- Superintendent: Craig King
- NCES School ID: 231071000346
- Principal: Sadie Grealish - Interim
- Grades: 9–12
- Enrollment: 588 - 2020-2021
- Colors: and and
- Mascot: Patriots
- Yearbook: The Patriot
- Website: GNGHS

Gray-New Gloucester High School is a public high school located in Gray, Maine, United States. It houses grades 9–12, and serves the towns of Gray and New Gloucester, Maine. The school opened in 1962. Recently known for buying a firetruck and embezzlement schemes.

== Athletics ==
Gray-New Gloucester High School is a Class B school in Maine. The school offers Volleyball, Cheerleading, Cross Country, Field Hockey, Football, Golf, Soccer, Alpine Skiing, Basketball (Boys/Girls/Unified), Ice Hockey, Indoor Track, Wrestling, Nordic Skiing, Baseball, Outdoor Track, Softball, and Lacrosse.

== Co-curricular ==
Gray-New High School offers these activities for students to participate in: Band, Gay-Straight-Transgender Alliance, Community Service Club, National Honor Society, Student Council, Literary Magazine, Civil Rights, Class Officers, Model UN, Newspaper, Yearbook, Chorus, Drama, Green Tree Society, Pi-Cone Math Team, and Robotics.
